= List of criminal enterprises, gangs, and syndicates =

List of groups engaged in illegal activities

The following is a listing of enterprises, gangs, mafias, and criminal syndicates that are involved in organized crime. Tongs and outlaw motorcycle gangs, as well as terrorist, militant, and paramilitary groups, are mentioned if they are involved in criminal activity for funding. However, since their stated aim and genesis is often ideological rather than commercial, they are distinct from mafia-type groups.

== Drug cartels ==
In several drug-producing or transit countries, drug traffickers have taken advantage of local corruption and lack of law enforcement to establish cartels turning in millions if not billions of dollars each year. Sometimes if government enforcement is particularly poor, the cartels become quasi-paramilitary organizations.

=== Latin America ===
- Dominican drug cartels
  - Paulino organization
  - Féliz organization
- Bolivian drug cartels (See also García Meza regime drug trafficking)
  - La Corporación (defunct)
  - Santa Cruz Cartel
- Nicaraguan drug cartels (see also Contras)
  - Blandón net
- Peruvian drug cartels (see also Shining Path and Vladimiro Montesinos)
  - Zevallos organisation
- Guatemalan drug cartels
  - Kaibiles
  - Los Huistas
  - Los Pelones
- Honduran drug cartels
  - Matta organization
  - Cachiros

==== Brazil ====
===== Active =====
- Amigos dos Amigos
- Bonde do Maluco
- Bonde dos 40
- Brazilian militias
  - Liga da Justiça
  - Escritório do Crime
- Comando Vermelho
- Sindicato do Crime
- Família do Norte
- Primeiro Comando da Capital
- Primeiro Grupo Catarinense
- Guardiões do Estado
- Terceiro Comando Puro

==== Venezuela ====
===== Active =====
- Cartel of the Suns
- Tren de Aragua
- Tren del Llano

==== Colombia ====
===== Active =====
- Bandas criminales (See also Paramilitarism in Colombia)
  - Clan del Golfo
- The Office of Envigado
- La Guajira Cartel
- National Liberation Army (Colombia)
- FARC dissidents

===== Defunct =====
- Black Eagles
  - New Generation
- Bloque Meta
- Bogotá Cartel
- Cali Cartel (see also Los Pepes)
- Medellín Cartel (See also Muerte a Secuestradores)
  - Miami branch
- Norte del Valle Cartel
- North Coast Cartel
- Leticia Cartel
- Libertadores del Vichada
- Los Machos
- Los Nevados
- Los Rastrojos
- Los Caparrapos
- Colombian Popular Revolutionary Anti-communist Army

==== Ecuador ====
===== Active =====
- Los Choneros
- Los Lobos
- Los Tiguerones

==== Mexico ====
- Gulf Cartel
  - Los Metros
  - Los Rojos
- Jalisco New Generation Cartel
  - Nueva Plaza Cartel
  - Los Balcanes (Balkan-based extortion ring, darknet operator and money laundering group)
  - Grupo Guerrero (armed wing)
  - Grupo Élite (paramilitary wing)
- Juárez Cartel
  - La Linea
- Sinaloa Cartel
  - Los Chapitos
  - La Mayiza
  - Los Ántrax
  - Gente Nueva
  - Artistas Asesinos (defunct)
  - Colima Cartel (defunct)
  - Milenio Cartel (defunct)
- Tijuana Cartel
  - Oaxaca Cartel (defunct)
- Los Zetas
  - Cártel del Noreste
  - Zetas Vieja Escuela
  - Los Talibanes
  - Sangre Nueva Zeta
- Beltrán-Leyva Cartel (defunct)
  - Guerreros Unidos
  - Los Mazatlecos
  - Los Rojos Cartel
  - La Barredora (defunct)
  - Independent Cartel of Acapulco (defunct)
  - Los Negros (defunct)
  - Los Pelones (defunct)
  - South Pacific Cartel (defunct)
- La Familia Michoacana (defunct)
  - La Nueva Familia Michoacana
  - Los Viagras
  - Cárteles Unidos
- Guadalajara Cartel (defunct)
  - Caborca Cartel
  - Sonora Cartel (defunct)
- Santa Rosa de Lima Cartel
- La Unión Tepito
- Knights Templar Cartel (defunct)
- Los Narcosatánicos (defunct)

=== Asia ===
- Golden Triangle
  - Burmese drug cartels (see also Myanmar Nationalities Democratic Alliance Army)
    - Khun Sa cartel (see also Mong Tai Army)
    - Red Wa Cartel (see also United Wa State Army and National Democratic Alliance Army)
    - Hawngleuk Militia
    - Han cartel
  - Laotian drug cartels (see also Ouane Rattikone)
- Golden Crescent
  - Afridi Network
  - Afghan drug cartels (see also Taliban)
    - Noorzai Organization
    - Khan organization
    - Karzai organization (alleged)
    - Bagcho organization
    - Haqqani Network

== North American organized crime ==
=== Canada ===
- Rivard organization
- Red Scorpions
- Bacon Brothers
- Irish Mob
  - West End Gang
- Dubois Brothers
- Indo-Canadian organized crime
- Italian-Canadian Mafia families
  - Cosa Nostra
    - Rizzuto crime family
    - Cuntrera-Caruana Mafia clan
    - Cotroni crime family
  - 'Ndrangheta
    - Luppino crime family
    - Musitano crime family
    - Papalia crime family
    - Siderno Group
    - Commisso 'ndrina

=== United States ===
- National Crime Syndicate
  - Seven Group
  - Murder, Inc.
- Prohibition-era gangs
  - Galveston
    - Downtown Gang
    - Beach Gang
    - Sam Maceo's Organisation
  - Broadway Mob
  - Ma Beland gang
  - The Lanzetta Brothers
  - Shelton Brothers Gang
  - Sheldon Gang
  - Circus Cafe Gang
  - Wandering Family
- Polish Mob
  - Saltis-McErlane Gang
  - Kielbasa Posse
  - The Greenpoint Crew
  - Flats Mob
  - The Flathead gang
- Dixie Mafia
  - Cornbread Mafia
  - State Line Mob
- Wall gang
- Greek-American organized crime
  - Philadelphia Greek Mob
  - Velentzas Family
- Hispanic-American
  - Marielitos
    - The Corporation
  - Puerto Rican mafia
    - Agosto organization
    - La ONU
    - Solano organization
    - Negri organization
    - Márquez gambling ring
  - Polanco-Rodriguez organization
- Chaldean mafia
- Hawaii
  - The Company
  - Leota mob
- Los Angeles (See also Rampart scandal)
  - Nash gang
  - Wonderland Gang
- Elkins mob
- Binion mob

==== American Mafia ====
Italian immigrants to the United States in the early 19th century brought with them the underground government many Americans refer to as "Cosa Nostra" (Our Thing) along with its traditions and formal induction rituals along with the concepts and precepts of Omerta, which espouses honorable and manly behavior at all times and under all conditions, taking care of your own problems and assisting your community, as well as non-cooperation with corrupt law enforcement and government officials. Many Italian-Americans around this same time also formed various small-time gangs which gradually evolved into sophisticated crime syndicates, but the nationwide organization known as "Cosa Nostra" has traditionally dominated organized crime in America for several decades. Although government crackdowns and a less-tightly knit Italian-American community have largely reduced its power, the American Mafia remains an active force in the underworld. Other organized crime gangs such as the 10th and Oregon crew are independent entities and thus not a part of “Cosa Nostra”, but have predominantly Italian-American membership and essentially run the same traditional rackets as the American Mafia.

===== Active =====
- The Commission
- The Five Families of New York City
  - Bonanno
    - Indelicato crew
    - The Motion Lounge Crew
  - Colombo
    - Scarpa crew
  - Genovese
    - 116th Street Crew
    - Greenwich Village Crew
    - New Jersey Crew
  - Gambino
    - Ozone Park Boys
    - DeMeo crew
    - Baltimore Crew
    - South Florida faction
    - New Jersey faction
    - The Bergin Crew
    - Cherry Hill Gambinos
  - Lucchese
    - The Jersey Crew
    - The Vario Crew
    - 107th Street gang
- Magaddino crime family
- DeCavalcante crime family
- The Chicago Outfit (see also Unione Siciliane)
- Philadelphia crime family
- Patriarca crime family
  - Angiulo Brothers crew
- Cleveland crime family
- Los Angeles crime family
- Kansas City crime family
- Cleveland crime family
- Trafficante crime family
- Detroit Partnership

===== Defunct =====
- Morello crime family
- Genna crime family
- Porrello crime family
- St. Louis crime family
- Rochester Crime Family
- Bufalino crime family
- Dallas crime family
- Denver crime family
- San Francisco crime family
- New Orleans crime family
- San Jose crime family
- Seattle crime family
- Omaha crime family
- Cardinelli gang
- New York Camorra
- East Harlem Purple Gang
- Las Vegas crew
- Pittsburgh crime family
- Milwaukee crime family

==== Jewish mafia ====
- New York City
  - The Bugs and Meyer Mob
  - Kaplan gang
  - New York divorce coercion gang
  - Rosenzweig gang
  - Rothstein organization
  - Schultz gang
  - Shapiro Brothers
  - Yiddish Black Hand
- Boston
  - 69th Street Gang
  - Sagansky organization
  - Solomon organization
- Los Angeles
  - Cohen crime family (mix between Jewish and Italian members)
- The Purple Gang
- Zwillman gang
- Kid Cann's gang
- Birger mob
- Cleveland Syndicate

==== African-American organized crime ====
- New York City
  - The Council (defunct)
  - Harlem numbers racket (defunct)
  - Bumpy Johnson gang (defunct)
  - Supreme Team (defunct)
  - The Bebos
  - The Country Boys (defunct)
  - Matthews Organization (defunct)
- The Family (defunct)
- Detroit
  - Black Mafia Family
  - Young Boys, Inc. (defunct)
  - Chambers Brothers (defunct)
- Philadelphia
  - Black Mafia (defunct)
  - Junior Black Mafia (defunct)
- Oakland, California
  - 69 Mob Funktown and Acorn mobb (defunct)
  - Williams organization (drug trafficking) (defunct)
- Washington, D.C.
  - Rayful Edmond organization (defunct)
  - Theodore Roe's gambling ring (defunct)
  - Stokes organization (defunct)
- Atlantic City
  - Aso Posse (defunct)
- Miami
  - Miami Boys (defunct)
- Rosemond Organization

==== Irish Mob ====
- Prohibition-era Chicago gangs
  - North Side Gang
  - James Patrick O'Leary organization
  - John Patrick Looney gang
  - Valley Gang
  - Ragen's Colts
  - Touhy gang
  - Enright gang
- Boston
  - Mullen Gang
  - Winter Hill Gang
  - Gustin Gang
  - Charlestown Mob
  - Killeen gang
- Danny Hogan's gang
- Danny Walsh gang
- Tom Dennison empire
- Nucky Johnson's Organization
- Danny Greene's Celtic Club
- K&A Gang
- New York
  - Dwyer gang
  - White Hand Gang
  - Higgins gang
  - The Westies
- St Louis
  - Hogan Gang
  - Egan's Rats

== European organized crime ==
- The Belgian Milieu
  - 'Hormone mafia' (defunct)
  - Milieu Liègeois (defunct)
- Czech Republic
  - Mrázek organization (defunct)
  - Krejčíř organization
  - Berdychův gang
  - Orlík Killers
- Dutch 'Penose'
  - Bruinsma drug gang (defunct)
  - Holleeder gang
  - Mieremet gang (defunct)
  - Riphagen gang (WWII-era)
  - Hopi Boys
- Finland
  - Nurmijärvi robbers
- French Milieu (See also Service d'Action Civique)
  - Corsican mafia (see also National Liberation Front of Corsica)
    - Unione Corse
      - Carbone crime family (defunct)
      - Francisci crime family (defunct)
      - Mondoloni crime family (defunct)
    - Brise de Mer gang
    - Petit Bar Gang
    - Venzolasca Gang
  - Les Caïds Des Cités
    - Faïd gang
    - The Barbarians
  - Wigs gang
  - North African Brigade (see also Carlingue)
  - Tractions Avant gang
  - Bande des Trois Canards
- Germany
- Thiefs in law of Russian-Eurasian-Organized-Crime (REOK)
- Al-Zein-Clan (mainly Ruhr area and Berlin)
- Remmo-Clan (mainly Berlin)
- Miri-Clan (mainly Bremen, Lower Saxony, Essen, Duisburg), Mhallamiye origin
- Abou-Chaker-Clan (mainly Berlin)
- Goman-Clan (mainly Leverkusen and Cologen)
- 'Ndrangheta (German division)
- Camorra (German divison)
- Hells Angels, Bandidos and other Outlaw Motorgangsr
- Greece
  - Greek mafia
- Ireland (See also Irish Republican Army)
  - Dublin
    - Cahill gang
    - Gilligan gang
    - Foley gang
    - Hyland gang
    - Dunne gang
    - The Westies
  - Limerick
    - McCarthy-Dundon
    - Keane-Collopy
  - Rathkeale Rovers
  - Kinahan gang
  - Hutch gang
- Poland (See also Group 13)
  - Pruszków mafia
- Slovak mafia
- Spain (see also ETA)
  - Garduña
  - Galician mafia
- Romani clans
  - Casamonica clan
  - El Clan De La Paca
  - Raffael clan
  - Sztojka clan
  - Rashkov clan
  - French gypsy gangs
    - Hornec gang
- Organized crime in Sweden
  - Original Gangsters
  - Fucked For Life
  - Uppsala mafia
  - Chosen Ones
  - Werewolf Legion
  - Asir
  - Vårvädersligan

=== Italian organized crime ===
Organized crime in Italy, especially the south, has existed for hundreds of years and has given rise to a number of notorious organizations with their own traditions and subculture which have managed to infiltrate almost every part of Italian society. The Italian mafia is often thought of as being the archetype for organized crime worldwide.

- Sicilian Mafia
  - See also List of Sicilian Mafia clans
    - Sicilian Mafia Commission
    - Mandamenti
    - Cuntrera-Caruana Mafia clan
    - Inzerillo Mafia clan
    - Corleonesi
    - Greco Mafia clan
    - Motisi Mafia clan
- 'Ndrangheta
  - See also List of 'ndrine
  - La Provincia
  - Honoured Society (Melbourne)
  - Mammoliti 'ndrina
  - Bellocco 'ndrina
  - Cataldo 'ndrina
  - Commisso 'ndrina
  - Cordì 'ndrina
  - De Stefano 'ndrina
  - Pesce 'ndrina
  - Barbaro 'ndrina
  - Piromalli 'ndrina
  - Serraino 'ndrina
  - Siderno Group
- Camorra
  - See also List of Camorra clans
  - Secondigliano Alliance
    - Licciardi clan
    - Contini clan
    - Lo Russo clan
    - Mallardo clan
  - Nuova Camorra Organizzata
  - Di Lauro Clan
  - Nuova Famiglia
  - Casalesi clan
  - Fabbrocino clan
  - Giuliano clan
  - Nuvoletta clan
  - Vollaro clan
  - Scissionisti di Secondigliano
  - La Torre clan
  - Alfieri clan
  - Russo clan
- Sacra Corona Unita
- Società foggiana
- Stidda
- Mala del Brenta
- Basilischi (defunct)
- Rome
  - Banda della Magliana (defunct)
  - Mafia Capitale (defunct)
- Milanese gangs
  - Banda della Comasina (defunct)
  - Turatello crew (defunct)
- White Uno Gang (defunct)

=== British organised crime "firms" ===
- London
  - Adams crime family
  - The Richardson Gang
  - The Firm
  - The Syndicate
  - Comer gang
  - Hunt Crime Syndicate
  - Buttmarsh Boys
  - 7th (gang)
  - Interwar era mobs
    - Messina Brothers
    - Sabini syndicate
    - Hoxton Gang
    - Elephant and Castle Mob
    - Birmingham Boys
- Essex Boys
- Manchester
  - Quality Street Gang
  - Noonan firm
  - Cheetham Hillbillies
  - The Gooch Close Gang
- Liverpool
  - Huyton Firm
  - Curtis Warren's drug empire
  - Whitney gang
- Aggi Crew
- Glasgow
  - Lyons Crime Family
  - McGraw firm
  - Thompson firm
  - Delta Crime Syndicate
- Brighton razor gangs (defunct)
- Bestwood Cartel

=== Balkan organized crime ===
Balkan organized crime gained prominence in the chaos following the communist era, notably the transition to capitalism and the wars in former Yugoslavia.

- Albanian mafia (See also accusations of drug trafficking and the Kosovo Liberation Army)
  - Albania
    - Gang of Çole (defunct)
    - Gang of Gaxhai (defunct)
    - Gang of Pusi i Mezinit (defunct)
    - Lazarat marijuana growers
  - Rudaj Organization (New York City) (defunct)
  - Gang of Ismail Lika (defunct)
  - Dobroshi gang (International)
  - Naserligan (Sweden)
  - K-Falangen (Sweden)
- Bosnian mafia
  - Prazina gang
  - Turković Organization
  - Bajramović gang
  - Delalić gang
  - Tito & Dino Cartel
  - M-Falangen (Sweden)
  - Car Theft Mob
- Bulgarian mafia (see also Multigroup)
  - VIS
  - SIC
  - Karamanski gang
  - TIM
  - Naglite
- Serbian mafia
  - Arkan clan
  - Zemun Clan
  - Joca Amsterdam gang
  - Magaš clan
  - Giška gang
  - Pink Panthers
  - Serb mafia in Scandinavia
    - Kotur mob
    - Cobra Mob
- Montenegrin mafia (see also allegations of Milo Đukanović's involvement in cigarette smuggling)
- North Macedonia mafia
  - Frankfurt mafia
- Romanian mafia
  - Băhăian organisation
  - Clanul Camataru
  - Clanul Cordunenilor
  - Clanul Rosianu
  - Craiova Underground Killers Gang
- Croatian organized crime (see also Croatian National Resistance, involved in racketeering in the United States during the Cold War)

== Post-Soviet organized crime ==
Although organized crime existed in the Soviet era, the gangs really gained in power and international reach during the transition to capitalism. The term Russian Mafia, 'mafiya' or mob is a blanket (and somewhat inaccurate) term for the various organized crime groups that emerged in this period from the 15 former republics of the USSR and unlike their Italian counterparts does not mean members are necessarily of Russian ethnicity or uphold any ancient criminal traditions, although this is the case for some members.

- Russian-Jewish mafia
  - Brighton Beach
    - Agron gang
    - Nayfeld gang
    - Balagula gang
  - Mogilevich organization
- Brothers' Circle (Existence is debatable)
- Russian mafia (See also Lubyanka Criminal Group, Three Whales Corruption Scandal and Sergei Magnitsky)
  - Moscow
    - Izmaylovskaya gang
    - Solntsevskaya bratva
      - New York branch
    - Orekhovskaya gang
  - St Petersburg (See also Baltik-Eskort)
    - Tambov Gang
  - Togliatti mafia
  - Uralmash gang
  - Lazovsky gang
  - Vladivostok gang
  - Kurganskaya group
  - Tsapok gang
  - 'Elephants' group
  - Kazan gang
  - A.U.E.
- Ukrainian mafia (See also Ukrainian oligarchs and Oleksandr Muzychko)
  - Donetsk Clan
  - Salem gang
  - Mukacheve cigarette smuggling syndicate
- Lithuanian mafia
  - Vilnius Brigade
- Estonian mafia
  - Linnuvabriku group
- Latvian mafia
  - The Kharitonov group
- Transnistrian mafia

=== Caucasian crime syndicates ===
See also Caucasus Emirate

- Georgian mafia (See also Mkhedrioni and Forest Brothers)
  - Kutaisi clan
  - Tbilisi clan
  - 21st Century Association
- Armenian mafia
  - Mirzoyan-Terdjanian organization
  - Armenian Power
- Azeri mafia
  - Janiev organization
- Chechen mafia (See also Special Purpose Islamic Regiment and Kadyrovtsy)
  - Obschina
  - Labazanov gang

=== Central Asian crime syndicates ===
- Uzbek mafia (See also Islamic Movement of Uzbekistan)
  - Rakhimov organization
- Kyrgyz mafia
  - Erkinbayev group (defunct)
  - Akmatbayev group (defunct)
  - Kolbayev group (defunct)

== Asian organized crime ==
=== East Asian criminal organizations ===
==== Korean criminal organizations ====
- Jongro street gang

==== Japanese Yakuza ====
Active yakuza groups

- Roku-daime Yamaguchi-gumi 六代目山口組
  - San-daime Kodo-kai 三代目弘道会
  - Go-daime Kokusui-kai 五代目國粹会
- Kobe Yamaguchi-gumi 神戸山口組
  - Ni-daime Takumi-gumi 二代目宅見組
- Go-daime Yamaken-gumi 五代目山健組
- Ikeda-gumi 池田組
- Kizuna-kai 絆會
- Inagawa-kai 稲川会
  - Yon-daime Yamakawa-ikka 四代目山川一家
  - Ju-daime Yokosuka-ikka 十代目横須賀一家
  - Juni-daime Koganei-ikka 十二代目小金井一家
- Sumiyoshi-kai 住吉会
  - Sumiyoshi-ikka Shichi-daime 住吉一家七代目
  - Kobayashi-kai San-daime 小林会三代目
  - Kohei-ikka Jusan-daime 幸平一家十三代目
  - Kyowa-ikka Shichi-daime 共和一家七代目
  - Doshida-ikka Kyu-daime 圡支田一家九代目
  - Saikaiya Kyu-daime 西海家九代目
  - Musashiya-ikka Ju-daime 武蔵屋一家十代目
  - Mabashi-ikka Shichi-daime 馬橋一家七代目
  - Shinwa-kai 親和会
    - Kansuke-ikka Juni-daime 勘助一家十二代目
  - Maruto-kai 丸唐会
  - Aota-kai 青田会
- Matsuba-kai 松葉会
  - Okubo-ikka Juni-daime 大久保一家十二代目
- Kanto Sekine-gumi 関東関根組
- Kyokuto-kai 極東会
  - Matsuyama-rengokai 松山連合会
- Dojin-kai 道仁会
  - Kitamura-gumi
- Gon-daime Kudo-kai 五代目工藤會
- Shichi-daime Aizu-Kotetsu-kai 七代目会津小鉄会
- Kyokyuryu-kai 旭琉會
- Namikawa-kai 浪川会
- Roku-daime Kyosei-kai 六代目共政会
- Yon-daime Fukuhaku-kai 四代目福博会
- Soai-kai 双愛会
- San-daime Kyodo-kai 三代目俠道会
- Taishu-kai 太州会
- Shichi-daime Goda-ikka 七代目合田一家
- Ni-daime Azuma-gumi 二代目東組
- Go-daime Asano-gumi 五代目浅野組
- Ju-daime Sakaume-gumi 十代目酒梅組
- Yon-daime Kozakura-ikka 四代目小桜一家
- Ni-daime Shinwa-kai 二代目親和会
- Tosei-kai 東声会
- San-daime Kumamoto-kai 三代目熊本會
- Kyu-daime Iijima-kai
- Chojiya-kai 丁字家会

Defunct yakuza groups

- Kantō-kai 関東会
- Ni-daime Honda-kai 二代目本多会
- Ni-daime Dainippon Heiwa-kai 二代目大日本平和会
- Yamaguchi-gumi Goto-gumi 後藤組
- Yamaguchi-gumi Suishin-kai 水心会
- Ichiwa-kai 一和会
- Kumamoto-rengo 熊本連合
- Kumamoto rengo San-daime Yamano-kai 三代目山野会
- Nakano-kai 中野会
- Kyokuto Sakurai-soke-rengokai 極東桜井總家連合会

Hangure (半グレ, literally "half-grey") are considered to be “jun-bōryokudan(準暴力団, quasi-yakuza)” groups. The term half-grey in Japanese refers to groups that commit crimes, yet are not considered to fit the description of criminal organizations (referring to yakuza clans in this context). They mostly consist of former Bōsōzoku teenagers and former juvenile delinquents (also known as furyō(不良)) in middle and high schools, who became an adult and refuse to join the Yakuza because of their dislike for the traditional code of the Yakuza. Sometimes they outsource their crimes to their kōhai delinquents at Old Bōsōzoku group or Alma Mater as Senpai.

- Kanto Union 関東連合 (semi-defunct)
- Dragon 怒羅権 (composed mainly of second and third generation repatriated Japanese orphans and Japanese people of Chinese descent.)
- Uchikoshi Spector 打越スペクター (conflict the Kanto Union.)
  - Kimura Brother's 木村兄弟 (street gang and ex Yamaguchi-gumi member.they against the Kanto Union for a long time.)
- Ota Union 大田連合
- Tuwamono 強者(defunct)
  - Kenmun's crew 拳月グループ
- Abyss アビス (youth gang)

==== Chinese Triads ====
- Sam Gor
- Tiandihui

Hong Kong-based Triads

- Chiu Chow Group 潮州集团
  - Sun Yee On 新義安(老新)
  - King Yee 景仪
  - Fuk Yee Hing 福怡兴
  - Yee Kwan 怡君
- 14K Group 十四K
  - 14K Yee 十四怡K
  - 14K Hau 十四豪K
  - 14K Yan 十四颜K
  - 14K Yung 十四容K
  - 14K Ngai 十四魏K
  - 14K Chung 十四钟K
  - 14K Mui 十四梅K
  - 14K Tak 十四德K
- Wo Group 和字頭
  - Wo Shing Wo 和勝和
  - Wo On Lok (Shui Fong) 和安樂(水房)
  - Wo Hop To 和合圖(老和)
  - Wo Yung Yee 和容义
  - Wo Kwan Ying 禾均英
  - Wo Li Wo 窝里窝
  - Wo Shing Tong 和盛堂
  - Wo Hung Shing 和鸿盛
  - Wo Kwan Lok 和均乐
  - Wo Yee Tong 和宜堂
  - Wo Shing Yee 和盛义
  - Wo Yat Ping 禾一平
  - Wo Yee Ping 和宜萍
- Sze Tai 四泰
  - Luen Group 聯字頭
    - Luen Ying Sh'e 联英社
    - Luen Kwan Ying 联君英
    - Luen Yee Sh'e 联谊社
    - Luen Kwan Sh'e 联官社
  - Tan Yee 陈怡
  - Macau Chai 澳门仔
  - Tung Group 通氏集团
    - Tung San Wo 东山和
    - Tung Lok Tong 同乐堂
    - Tung Yee 东义
- Big Circle Gang 大圈
- Hunan Gang 湖南帮
- Rung Group 梯级组
- Shing Group 盛氏集团
- Chuen Group 全集团
  - Chuen Chi Wo 全志和
  - Chuen Yat Chi 全一志
- Carpet Bomber 地毯轰炸机
- Neon Dragon 霓虹龙
- Sio Sam Ong (小三王)
- Chinese-American gangs (See also Tongs)
- Wah Ching 華青
  - Ping On
- Black Dragons 黑龍
- Jackson Street Boys 積臣街小子
- Secret societies in Singapore
- ai Lok San / Pek Kim Leng
- Wah Kee華記

Taiwan-based Triads

- United Bamboo Gang 竹聯幫
- Four Seas Gang 四海幫
- Celestial Alliance
- Mainland Chinese crime groups (see also Hanlong Group)
- Chongqing group 重慶組
- Defunct
  - Honghuzi gangs
  - Green Gang 青帮
- Boshe group

Triads in Chợ Lớn

- Tín Mã Nàm

=== Southeast Asian criminal organizations ===
==== Thai gangs ====
- Chao pho
- Red Wa

==== Cambodian crime gangs ====
- Teng Bunma organization

==== Indonesian crime gangs ====
- Preman (See also Pancasila Youth and insurgency in Aceh)
- Medan gang
- Forum Betawi Rempug

==== Malaysian crime gangs ====
- Mamak Gang

==== Filipino crime gangs ====
- Waray-Waray gangs
- Bahala Na Gang
- Kuratong Baleleng
- Sigue Sigue Sputnik gang
- Changco gang

==== Vietnamese Xã Hội Đen ====
- Bình Xuyên
- Đại Cathay's mafia
- Năm Cam's mafia
- Dung Hà's gang
- Khánh Trắng's "Đồng Xuân Labor Union", a crime syndicate under the guise of a legal entity

=== South Asian criminal organizations ===
==== Indian mafia ====
- Mumbai
  - D-Company डी कंपनी
  - Rajan gang राजन गिरोह
  - Gawli gang गवली गिरोह
  - Rajan gang
  - Surve gang
  - Mudaliar gang
  - Mastan gang
  - Budesh gang
  - Kalani gang
- Uttar Pradesh
  - Ansari gang
  - Yadav gang
- Bangalore
  - Rai gang
  - Ramachandra gang
  - Jayaraj gang
- Kala Kaccha Gang
- Chaddi Baniyan Gang

==== Sri Lankan criminal groups ====
- Tamil Tigers
- Eelam People's Democratic Party
- Tamil Makkal Viduthalai Pulikal

==== Pakistani mafia ====
- Chotu gang
- Lyari Gang
- Mafia Raj
- Dacoit gangs
- Singh gang
- Veerappan gang
- Devi gang

=== Middle Eastern criminal organizations ===
==== Iranian mafia ====
- Tahvili crime family
- The Organization
- Zindashti cartel aka Unit 840

==== Israeli mafia ====
- Abergil crime family
- Uda Organization
- Mulner Organization
- Alperon crime family משפחת הפשע אלפרון
- Zeev Rosenstein organization הארגון של זאב רוזנשטיין
- Palestinian organized crime (See also Abu Nidal Organization)
  - Doghmush clan

==== Lebanese mafia ====
- Mhallami-Lebanese crime clans
  - Miri-Clan
  - Al-Zein Clan
- Juomaa drug trafficking organisation (See also Hezbollah)
- Ibrahim clan

==== Turkish mafia ====
- Yüksekova Gang
- Kilic gang
- Cakici gang
- Peker gang
- Yaprak gang
- Topal organisation
- Söylemez Gang
- Kurdish mafia
  - Baybasin drug organization
  - Cantürk organization
  - Arifs
- Turkish organised crime in Germany
  - Arabaci clan
  - Imac clan (Netherlands)

==== Yemeni mafia ====
- Houthi movement

== Australian organized crime ==
- Melbourne
  - Carlton Crew
  - Moran family
  - Williams family
  - Pettingill family
  - Richmond gang
- Perth
  - Sword Boys
- Sydney
  - Razor gangs
  - 5T gang
  - Freeman gang
  - The Team
  - Mr Sin gang
- Italian-Australian organized crime
  - The Carlton Crew
  - 'Ndrangheta
    - Honoured Society

== Caribbean crime groups ==
- Belizean gangs
- Curaçaoan No Limit Soldiers
- Guyanese Phantom death squad
- Haitian Zoe Pound (see also Tonton Macoute)
- Jamaican yardies and posses
  - Shower Posse
  - POW Posse
  - Tottenham Mandem
    - Star Gang
  - Klans Massive
- Puerto Rican Organizacion de Narcotraficantes Unidos
- Trinidadian & Tobagoan Chadee gang (see also Jamaat al Muslimeen)

== African organized crime ==
- Mai-Mai militia gangs
- The Numbers Gang
- Kenya
  - Akasha crime family
  - Mungiki
- Cape Verdean organized crime
- Somali pirates
  - Hobyo-Harardhere Piracy Network
- Nigerian organized crime
  - Confraternities in Nigeria
    - Black Axe Confraternity
  - Anini gang
- Le Roux organization
- Moroccan mafia
  - Ahmed organization
  - Mocro Maffia
    - Taghi clan
    - Fassih clan

== Cybercrime networks ==
As society enters the Information Age, certain individuals take advantage of easy flow of information over the Internet to commit online fraud or similar activities. Often the hackers will form a network to better facilitate their activities. On occasion the hackers will be a part of a criminal gang involved in more 'blue collar crime', but this is unusual.

- ShadowCrew
- Avalanche
- DarkMarket
- Legion of Doom
- Carder.su
- Tor Carding Forum
- HackBB
- Masters of Deception
- Russian cybercrime
  - Russian Business Network
  - Anton Gelonkin internet fraud group
  - Leo Kuvayev internet spam group
  - CyberVor
- Darknet markets
  - AlphaBay
  - Utopia
  - The Silk Road
  - Sheep Marketplace
  - TheRealDeal
  - Black Market Reloaded
  - The Farmer's Market
  - Evolution
  - Agora
  - AlphaBay Market
  - Russian Anonymous Marketplace

== Drug and smuggling rings ==
Smuggling is a behavior that has occurred ever since there were laws or a moral code that forbade access to a specific person or object. At the core of any smuggling organization is the economic relationship between supply and demand. From the organization's point of view, the issues are what the consumer wants, and how much the consumer is willing to pay the smuggler or smuggling organization to obtain it.

- England
  - Hawkhurst Gang (historical)
  - The Aldington Gang(historical)
- Organ trafficking organizations
  - Gurgaon organ trafficking network
- Arms trafficking organizations
  - Russian arms traffickers
    - Viktor Bout's organization
    - Leonid Minin's organization
  - Monzer al-Kassar's organization
  - Tomislav Damnjanovic organization
  - Soghanalian organization
- People smuggling
  - Snakeheads 蛇頭
    - Sister Ping's organization
  - Coyotaje
  - Shettie organization
  - Mediterranean people smugglers
- Lai Changxing organization
- Bedouin smugglers
- Subotić Tobacco mafia (alleged)

=== Drug rings ===
- North American drug rings
  - Garza organization
  - Jesse James Hollywood's drug ring
  - The Brotherhood of Eternal Love
  - Black Tuna Gang
  - The Company
  - Jung organization
  - Mancuso organization
  - Chagra organization
  - "Freeway" Rick Ross
  - Ike Atkinson
  - Cournoyer organization
  - Cowboy Mafia
  - Pizza Connection
  - The Yogurt Connection
- Bali Nine
- Mr Asia syndicate
- The French Connection
- The Couscous connection
- Valencia drug ring
- Brian Brendan Wright's drug empire
- Howard Marks
- Rum-running organization
  - William McCoy
  - Roy Olmstead
- Remus organization
- Yashukichi network
- Edward Ezra's opium smuggling operation
- Tyrrell organisation
- Guinea-Bissau cocaine traffickers
  - Na Tchuto organization

== Prison gangs ==
Prisons are a natural meeting place for criminals, and for the purposes of business and protection from other inmates, prisoners join gangs. These gangs often develop a large influence outside the prison walls through their networks. Most prison gangs do more than offer simple protection for their members. Most often, prison gangs are responsible for any drug, tobacco or alcohol handling inside correctional facilities. Furthermore, many prison gangs involve themselves in prostitution, assaults, kidnappings and murders. Prison gangs often seek to intimidate the other inmates, pressuring them to relinquish their food and other resources. In addition, prison gangs often exercise a large degree of influence over organized crime in the "free world", larger than their isolation in prison might lead one to expect.

- Vory v zakone (вор в законе) (Prisons in Russia and other post-Soviet countries)
- The Numbers Gang (Prisons in South Africa) See also The Ninevites
- Brödraskapet (The Brotherhood) (Kumla Prison, Sweden)
- The Overcoat Gang (Prisons in Australia)
- Philippines
  - New Bilibid Prison
    - Commandos
  - Wild Boys of DaPeCol (Davao)

=== Prison gangs in the United States ===
- White
  - Aryan Brotherhood
  - Dead Man Incorporated
  - Public Enemy No. 1
  - Nazi Lowriders
  - Soldiers of Aryan Culture
  - European Kindred
  - Aryan Circle
  - 211 Crew
  - Peckerwoods
  - Aryan Brotherhood of Texas
  - Family Affiliated Irish Mafia (FAIM)
- Hispanic
  - Barrio Azteca
  - Mexican Mafia (La Eme)
  - Nuestra Familia
  - Texas Syndicate (Syndicato Tejano)
  - Ñetas
  - Puro Tango Blast
  - Mexikanemi
  - Hermanos de Pistoleros Latinos
- African American
  - Black Guerrilla Family
  - D.C. Blacks
  - United Blood Nation
  - KUMI 415
- People Nation
- Folk Nation

== Street gangs ==
Youth gangs have often served as a recruiting ground for more organized crime syndicates, where juvenile delinquents grow up to be full-fledged mobsters, as well as providing muscle and other low-key work. Increasingly, especially in the United States and other western countries, street gangs are becoming much more organized in their own right with a hierarchical structure and are fulfilling the role previously taken by traditional organized crime.

=== North America ===
- Friends Stand United
- Freight Train Riders of America (alleged)
- Juggalo gangs
- Albanian Boys Inc
- Chicago
  - TAP Boyz
  - Simon City Royals
  - Chicago Gaylords
  - Jousters
  - Almighty Saints
  - Popes
- Italian-American street gangs
  - 10th and Oregon Crew
  - South Brooklyn Boys
  - Forty-Two Gang
  - The Tanglewood Boys
- Green Street Counts
- Zoe Pound
- Pacific-Islander American gangs
  - Sons of Samoa
  - Tongan Crip Gang
- Native Mob
- Savage Skulls (defunct)

==== African-American ====
- Chicago
  - Gangster Disciples
  - Mickey Cobras
  - Black Disciples
  - Vice Lords
  - Black P. Stones
  - Four Corner Hustlers
  - OutLaw Gangster Disciples
- Black P. Stones (Jungles)
- Bloods
  - Sex Money Murda
  - Double II Set
  - Pirus
  - Nine Trey Gangsters
- Crips
  - Venice Shoreline Crips
  - Rollin 60's Neighborhood Crips
  - Eight Tray Gangsta Crips
  - Du Roc Crips
  - Rollin' 30s Harlem Crips
  - Grape Street Watts Crips
  - South Side Compton Crips
- 12th Street Gang
- Errol Flynns
- Westmob
- Hidden Valley Kings
- New York City
  - Bishops (gang)
  - Decepticons (defunct)
  - Black Spades (defunct)
  - GS9
- Boston
  - Lucerne Street Doggz
  - Columbia Point Dawgs
  - Orchard Park Trailblazers
- Minneapolis–Saint Paul
  - Somali Outlaws

==== Native American/Indigenous ====
- Minneapolis–Saint Paul
  - Native Mob

==== Asian-American ====
- New York City Chinatown
  - Ghost Shadows 鬼影幫
  - Flying Dragons
  - Born To Kill 天生殺手幫
- Asian Boyz 亞洲 (Crip set)
- Chung Ching Yee (Joe Boys) 忠精義
- Fullerton Boys
- Menace of Destruction 毀滅的威脅
- Temple Street (Filipino-Mexican)
- Tiny Rascal gang
- Satanas
- Viet Boyz

==== Hispanic ====
- Latin Kings
- Ghetto Brothers
- Mau Maus
- New York City Dominican gangs
  - Dominicans Don't Play
  - Jheri Curls
  - Trinitarios
- California
  - White Fence
  - Whittier gang
  - Fresno Bulldogs
  - Lott Stoner Gang
  - Norteños
  - Sureños
    - 38th Street gang
    - Culver City Boys 13
    - Santa Monica 13
    - Azusa 13
    - Puente 13
    - OVS
    - Eastside Bolen Parque 13
    - Northside Bolen Parque 13
    - El Monte Flores 13
    - Venice 13
    - Tooner Ville Rifa 13
    - Clanton 14
    - Varrio Nuevo Estrada
    - Playboys
    - Avenues
    - Logan Heights Gang
    - Pomona 12th Street Sharkies
- Chicago
  - La Raza Nation
  - Latin Counts
  - Maniac Latin Disciples
  - Spanish Cobras
  - Spanish Gangster Disciples
- Los Mexicles

==== Historical ====
- Irish American
  - Bottoms Gang
  - 19th Street Gang
  - Bowe Brothers
  - 40 Thieves
  - Dead Rabbits
  - Gopher Gang
  - Grady Gang
  - Five Points Gang
  - Daybreak Boys
  - Tenth Avenue Gang
  - Kerryonians
  - Roach Guards
  - Whyos
  - Chichesters
  - Marginals
  - Live Oak Boys
  - Potashes
- New York
  - Neighbors' Sons
  - Boodle Gang
  - Loomis Gang
  - Baxter Street Dudes
  - Honeymoon Gang
  - Mandelbaum organization
  - Dutch Mob
  - Eastman Gang
  - Batavia Street Gang
  - Bowery Boys
  - Charlton Street Gang
  - Gas House Gang
  - Lenox Avenue Gang
  - Crazy Butch Gang
  - Hudson Dusters
  - Humpty Jackson Gang
  - Slaughter House Gang
  - Cherry Hill Gang
  - Swamp Angels
  - Yakey Yakes
  - Hook Gang
  - Tub of Blood Bunch
- Baltimore
  - Bloody Tubs
  - Plug Uglies
- Sydney Ducks
- Chicago
  - Formby Gang
  - Henry Street Gang
- Yellow Henry Gang

==== Gangs in Canada ====
- Vancouver
  - Independent Soldiers
  - United Nations
  - Red Scorpions
- Aboriginal Based Organized Crime
  - Indian Posse
  - Native Syndicate
  - Redd Alert
  - Manitoba Warriors - 1323
- Toronto
  - VVT
  - Dixon Bloods
- Tri-City Skins
- Shiners (historical)
- NorthBlock Syndicate

==== Other ====
- El Salvador
  - Maras
  - Mara Salvatrucha
  - 18th Street gang
- Gangs in Haiti
  - Zoe Pound
  - Cannibal Army
- Belize

==== South America ====
- Gangs in Brazil
  - Rio de Janeiro
    - Amigos dos Amigos
    - Terceiro Comando
    - Terceiro Comando Puro
  - Brazilian police militias
    - Acre death squad
- Argentina
  - Los BackStreet Boys

==== Europe ====
- Gangs in the United Kingdom
  - London
    - 67
    - Brick Lane Massive
    - GAS Gang
    - Ghetto Boys
    - Harlem Spartans
    - Mali Boys
    - Mus Love Crew
    - OFB
    - Peckham Boys
    - PDC
    - Tottenham Mandem
    - Wo Shing Wo street gang (defunct)
    - Woolwich Boys
    - Zone 2
  - Gooch gang
  - Birmingham
    - Lynx gang
    - Burger Bar Boys & Johnson Crew
  - Croxteth Crew & Strand Crew
- Denmark
  - AK81
  - Black Cobra
  - Loyal to Familia
- Belgium
  - Kamikaze Riders
- France
  - Black Dragons
  - Red Warriors
- Turkish-German gangs
  - 36 Boys
  - Black Jackets
  - Osmanen Germania
  - Guerilla Nation
- Sweden
  - Al Salam 313
  - Original Gangsters
- Apaches (Belle Époque period)
- Red Wall Gang (Dublin)

==== Africa ====
- Gangs in South Africa
  - Cape Ganglands
    - Hard Livings
    - The Americans
- Gangs in Nigeria
  - Area Boys
    - One Million Boys
- Morocco
  - Tcharmils

==== Asia ====
- Salakau (Singapore)
- Filipino gangs
  - Bahala Na Gang
  - Rugby boys
  - Waray-Waray gangs
- Aava Gang (Sri Lanka)

==== Oceania ====
- Gangs in Australia
  - Sydney
    - Rocks Push
    - Bra Boys
    - Brothers for Life
    - Dlasthr
  - Melbourne
    - Apex (existence disputed)
    - Islander 23
    - HP Boyz
    - Next Gen Shooters
  - Perth
    - Sword Boys
  - Evil Warriors
- Gangs in New Zealand
  - Mongrel Mob
  - Black Power
  - New Zealand Nomads
  - King Cobras
  - Killa Beez
  - Fourth Reich
- Raskol gangs

== Outlaw motorcycle clubs ==
- Bandidos Motorcycle Club
- Black Pistons Motorcycle Club
- Blue Angels Motorcycle Club
- Coffin Cheaters
- Finks Motorcycle Club
- Hells Angels Motorcycle Club
- Highway 61 Motorcycle Club
- Highwaymen Motorcycle Club
- Mongols Motorcycle Club
- Night Wolves
- Outlaws Motorcycle Club
- Pacinko
- Pagan's Motorcycle Club
- Rebels Motorcycle Club
- Rebels Motorcycle Club (Canada)
- Road Knights
- Satudarah
- Sons of Silence
- Vagos Motorcycle Club
- Warlocks Motorcycle Club

== Other ==
- Timber mafia
  - Malagasy logging syndicates
    - 'Rosewood mafia'
- Football hooliganism groups
  - La barra del Rojo
  - 6.57 Crew
  - Arsenal firm
  - Aston Villa Hardcore
- Prostitution rings
  - Emperors Club VIP
  - Heidi Fleiss prostitution ring
  - North Preston's Finest
  - Pamela Martin and Associates
- Spy rings
  - Atomic spies
  - Cambridge Five
  - Duquesne Spy Ring
  - Illegals program
  - Portland spy ring
  - Walker spy ring
- Burglary rings
  - Dinner Set Gang
  - Bling Ring
  - Johnston gang
  - Sugarman Gang
- Fraud rings (See also List of Ponzi schemes)
  - Potato Bag gang
  - Nigerian 419 gangs
    - Chief Nwude and accomplices
  - Benson Syndicate
  - Dominion of Melchizedek
- Illegal gambling rings
  - Brazilian Jogo do Bicho rings
    - Anísio group
    - Capitão Guimarães group
    - Andrade group
    - Luizinho Drummond group
    - Turcão group
    - Pinheiro group
  - Tan betting syndicate
  - Bad Newz Kennels dogfighting ring
- Human trafficking rings
  - Domotor family crime group
  - la Chancha gang
- Wildlife trafficking rings
  - Wong organization
- Kidnapping
  - Black Death Group (alleged)
  - The College Kidnappers
- Criminals-for-hire
  - Philadelphia Poison Ring (murder-for-hire)
  - Sangerman's Bombers (arson)
- The Chickens and the Bulls

=== Historical ===
- Black Hand
  - Chicago Black Hand
- Thuggee (See also Criminal Tribes Act)
- Garduna
- Markham Gang
- England
  - Early crime syndicates
    - Jonathan Wild's crime ring
    - Charles Hitchen's crime ring
    - Forty Elephants
    - Ikey Solomon gang
    - Worth gang
  - Street gangs
    - The Yiddishers
    - Peaky Blinders
    - Scuttlers
    - Glasgow
      - Penny Mobs
      - Tongs
      - Razor gangs
        - Norman Conks
- Predecessors to modern yakuza (See also Genyōsha)
  - Tekiya 的屋
  - Bakuto 博徒
  - Kabukimono 傾奇者 (カブキもの)
- American Frontier gangs (See also List of Old West gangs)
  - Ames organization
  - Soap Gang criminal empire, Denver, Creede, Colorado, and Skagway, Alaska 1880s-1890s.
  - Swearengen gang
  - Banditti of the Prairie
  - Dodge City Gang
- Dennison syndicate
  - The Cowboys (Cochise County)
  - Blonger gang
- Ringvereine (Weimar Germany)
- Historic prostitution rings
  - Zwi Migdal
    - Ashkenazum
  - Red Light Lizzie and associates
  - Jane the Grabber and associates
- Historical Russian gangs (See also Early life of Joseph Stalin)
  - Mishka Yaponchik gang
  - Kotovsky gang
- Stuppagghiari

== See also ==
- Crime family
- Illegal drug trade
- Mafia state
- Organized crime
- Police corruption
- Political corruption
- Racketeering
- War on drugs

Other lists

- List of bank robbers and robberies
- List of computer criminals
- List of confidence tricks
- List of crime bosses
- List of depression-era outlaws
- List of designated terrorist groups
- List of guerrilla movements
- List of hooligan firms
- List of law enforcement agencies
- List of non-state groups accused of terrorism
- List of Mexico's 37 most-wanted drug lords
- List of most wanted fugitives in Italy

Laws

- Continuing Criminal Enterprise Statute
- Racketeer Influenced and Corrupt Organizations Act
