= List of criminal organizations in New York City =

Due in large part to its steadily high population and rich history, New York City has played host to various criminal organizations, gangs, mafias, and syndicates. The following is a list of these groups, past and present.

== Active ==
- Black Spades
- Crips
  - Young Gunnaz/Ygz
  - Rollin' 30s Harlem Crips
- Dominicans Don't Play
- Five Families - The five most prominent families of the Italian-American Mafia (Cosa Nostra) in New York City.
  - Bonanno Family
  - Colombo Family
  - Gambino Family
    - Ozone Park Boys
  - Genovese Family
    - Greenwich Village Crew
    - 116th Street Crew
  - Lucchese Family
  - The Commission - Governing body of LCN
  - Sixth Family - placeholder title for a family which matches or surpasses the power of the Five Families
- Greenpoint Crew
- Hell's Angels
- Hip Sing Association
- Latin Kings
- MS-13
- Pagans
- Savage Skulls
- South Brooklyn Boys
- Trinitarios
- United Blood Nation - East-coast faction of the Bloods street gang.
  - Nine Trey Bloods Gangsters
  - Sex Money Murder
- Velentzas Organization

== Inactive ==
- 19th Street Gang (1870s)
- Albanian Mafia
  - Albanian Boys (1990s)
  - Rudaj Organization (1993-2004)
- Batavia Street Gang (1890s- early 1900s)
- Baxter Street Dudes (1870s)
- Boodle Gang (1850s-1890s)
- Born to Kill (1980-1992), who were active in Chinatown
- Bowe Brothers (1840-1860)
- Bowery Boys (1830s-1860s)
- Breed Motorcycle Club (1965-2006)
- Broadway Mob (1920s)
- Brooklyn Camorra (1885-1918)
- Bugs and Meyer Mob (1920s-1930s)
- Charlton Street Gang (1860s)
- Cherry Hill Gang (1890s- early 1900s)
- Chichesters (1820s-1860s)
- Cosa Nostra
  - DeMeo Crew (1960s-1983)
  - Gallo Crew (1950s-1972)
  - Morello family (1890s-1931) - Predecessor to what would become the Genovese family
  - Tanglewood Boys (1990s)
- Crazy Butch Gang (1890s- early 1900s)
- Daybreak Boys (1840s-1859)
- Dead Rabbits (1830s-1860s)
- Dutch Mob (1870s-1880s)
- East Harlem Purple Gang (1970s-1980s)
- Eastman Gang (1890s-1910s)
- Five Points Gang (1890s-1920s)
- Flying Dragons (1967-1994)
- Forty Thieves (1825-1860s) - Considered the first known street gang in New York City
- Gas House Gang (1880s-1910)
- Ghost Shadows (1970s-1990s)
- Gopher Gang (1890s-1910s)
- Grady Gang (1860s)
- Honeymoon Gang (1850s)
- Hook Gang (1866-1876)
- Hudson Dusters (1890s-1917)
- Jheri Curls (1990s)
- Kerryonians (1825-1830s)
- Lenox Avenue Gang (early 1900s-1910s)
- Marginals (early 1900s)
- Mau Maus (1950-1965)
- Molasses Gang (1870s)
- National Crime Syndicate (1929-1960s)
  - Murder, Inc. (1929-1941)
- Neighbors' Sons (early 1900s-1916)
- New York divorce coercion gang (1980s-2013)
- Patsy Conroy Gang (1860s-1874)
- Potashes (1890s)
- Potato Bag Gang (1970s)
- Rhodes Gang (1890s-1910s)
- Roach Guards (1820s-1860s)
- Savage Nomads (1960s-1970s)
- Shirt Tails (1830s-1860s)
- Slaughter House Gang (1840s-1860s)
- Supreme Team (1981-2001)
- Swamp Angels (1850s-1890s)
- Tenth Avenue Gang (1860-1870s)
- The Council
- Tub of Blood Bunch (1860s)
- Westies (1960s-1988)
- White Hand Gang (early 1900s-1925)
- White Tigers (1980s-1990s)
- Whyos (1860s-1890s)
- Yakey Yakes (1890s-early 1900s)
- Yiddish Black Hand (early 1900s)
- Zwi Migdal (1867-1939)
