= HVK =

HVK may refer to:

- Hard vitreous kernel count, a measure of quality for grain
- Haveke language, spoken in New Caledonia
- Hidden Valley Kings, an American street gang
- Hólmavík Airport, in Iceland
- HVK Gusar, a Croatian rowing club
- Patriotic Electoral Coalition (Hungarian: Hazafias Választási Koalíció), a former political coalition in Hungary
- Herbert von Karajan, an Austrian orchestral conductor
- Hans von Kaltenborn, American radio commentator
