= Formby (disambiguation) =

Formby may refer to:

People

- Bent Formby, Danish biochemist
- George Formby Jr. (1904–1961), English singer, comedian, actor, famous for his banjo ukulele
- George Formby Sr. (1875–1921), Edwardian music hall comedian, father of George Formby, Jr.
- Henry Formby (1816–1884), English Roman Catholic priest and writer
- Homer Formby (born 1924), American antiques dealer and authority on wood care and furniture refinishing
- Jennie Formby, British trade unionist (Unite) and member of the British Labour party
- John Formby (1819–1906), shipping agent of Port Adelaide, South Australia
- Margaret Formby (1929–2003), founder of the National Cowgirl Museum and Hall of Fame in Texas
- Mark Formby, American politician from Mississippi, member of Mississippi House of Representative
- Nicola Formby (born 1965), South African model, actress, and journalist
- Wilkin Formby (born 2005), American football player
- William Harper Formby (1818–1892), horse dealer in South Australia

Other

- Formby, a town in Merseyside, England
- Formby railway station in the town of Formby
- Formby F.C., a football club in the town of Formby
- Formby Gang, a criminal Chicago street gang in late 1890s to early 1900s
