= Mafia =

Type of organized crime enterprise

Informally or generally, a mafia is any of various criminal organizations that include, or bear a strong similarity to, the original Sicilian Mafia, the Italian-American Mafia, or other Italian organized crime groups. The central activity of such an organization would be the arbitration of disputes between criminals, as well as the organization and enforcement of illicit agreements between criminals through violence. Mafias often engage in secondary activities such as gambling, loan sharking, drug trafficking, prostitution, and fraud.

The term Mafia was originally applied only to the Sicilian Mafia. The term has expanded over time to encompass other organizations of similar practices and objectives, e.g. "the Russian mafia" or "the Japanese mafia". The term was coined by the press and is informal; the criminal organizations themselves have their own names (e.g. the Sicilian Mafia and the related Italian-American mafia refer to their organizations as "Cosa nostra"; the "Japanese mafia" calls itself Ninkyō dantai but is more commonly known as "yakuza" by the public; and "Russian mafia" groups often call themselves "bratva").

When used alone and without any qualifier, "Mafia" or "the Mafia" typically refers to either the Sicilian Mafia or the Italian-American Mafia and sometimes Italian organized crime in general (e.g. Camorra and 'Ndrangheta). By the 2020s, the 'Ndrangheta, originating in the southern Italian region of Calabria, was widely considered the richest and most powerful Mafia in the world. The 'Ndrangheta has been around for as long as the better-known Sicilian Cosa Nostra but was only designated as a Mafia-type association in 2010 under Article 416 bis of the Italian Penal Code. Italy's highest court of last resort, the Supreme Court of Cassation, had ruled similarly on 30 March 2010.

== Etymology ==
Mafia (English: /ˈmɑːfiə/; Italian: [ˈmaːfja]) derives from the Sicilian adjective mafiusu, which roughly translated means "swagger" but can also be translated as "boldness" or "bravado". According to scholar Diego Gambetta, mafiusu (mafioso in Italian) in 19th-century Sicily, in reference to a man, signified "fearless", "enterprising", and "proud". (Note: This etymology is based on the books Che cosa è la mafia? by Gaetano Mosca, Mafioso by Gaia Servadio, The Sicilian Mafia by Diego Gambetta, Mafia & Mafiosi by Henner Hess, and Cosa Nostra by John Dickie.) In reference to a woman, the feminine-form adjective mafiusa means "beautiful" or "attractive". Because Sicily was under Islamic rule from 827 to 1091, Mafia may have come to Sicilian through Arabic, although the word's origins are uncertain. Mafia in the Florentine dialect means "poverty" or "misery", while a cognate word in Piedmontese is mafium, meaning "a little or petty person". Possible Arabic roots of the word include:

- maʿfī (معفي), meaning "exempted". In Islamic law, jizya is the yearly tax imposed on non-Muslims residing in Muslim lands, and people who pay it are "exempted" from prosecution.
- màha, meaning "quarry" or "cave"; the mafie were the caves in the region of Marsala that acted as hiding places for persecuted Muslims and later served other types of refugees, in particular Giuseppe Garibaldi's "Redshirts" after their embarkment on Sicily in 1860 in the struggle for Italian unification. According to Giuseppe Guido Lo Schiavo, cave in Arabic literary writing is Maqtaa hagiar, while in popular Arabic it is pronounced as Mahias hagiar, and then "from Maqtaa (Mahias) = Mafia, that is cave, hence the name (ma)qotai, quarrymen, stone-cutters, that is, Mafia".
- mahyāṣ (مهياص), meaning "aggressive boasting" or "bragging".
- marfūḍ (مرفوض), meaning "rejected", considered to be the most plausible derivation; marfūḍ developed into marpiuni ("swindler") to marpiusu and finally mafiusu.
- muʿāfā (معافى), meaning "safety" or "protection".
- maʿāfir (معافر), the name of an Arab tribe that ruled Palermo. The local peasants imitated these Arabs and as a result the tribe's name entered the popular lexicon. The word Mafia was then used to refer to the defenders of Palermo during the Sicilian Vespers against rule of the Capetian House of Anjou on 30 March 1282.
- mafyaʾ (مفيء), meaning "place of shade". Shade meaning refuge or derived from refuge. After the Normans destroyed the Saracen rule in Sicily in the 11th century, Sicily became feudalistic. Most Arab smallholders became serfs on new estates, with some escaping to "the Mafia". It became a secret refuge.

The public's association of the word with the criminal secret society was perhaps inspired by the 1863 play I mafiusi di la Vicaria ('The Mafiosi of the Vicaria') by Giuseppe Rizzotto and Gaspare Mosca. Mafia and mafiusi are never mentioned in the play. The play is about a Palermo prison gang with traits similar to the Mafia: a boss, an initiation ritual, and talk of umirtà (omertà or code of silence) and pizzu (a codeword for extortion money). The play had great success throughout Italy. Soon after, the use of Mafia began appearing in the Italian state's early reports on the phenomenon. The word made its first official appearance in 1865 in a report by the then prefect of Palermo Filippo Antonio Gualterio.

== Definitions ==
Mafia was never officially used by Sicilian mafiosi, who prefer to refer to their organization as "Cosa Nostra". Nevertheless, it is typically by comparison to the groups and families that comprise the Sicilian Mafia that other criminal groups are given the label. Giovanni Falcone, an anti-Mafia judge murdered by the Sicilian Mafia in 1992, objected to the conflation of Mafia with organized crime in general. In 1990, he said:

While there was a time when people were reluctant to pronounce the word "Mafia" ... nowadays people have gone so far in the opposite direction that it has become an overused term ... I am no longer willing to accept the habit of speaking of the Mafia in descriptive and all-inclusive terms that make it possible to stack up phenomena that are indeed related to the field of organized crime but that have little or nothing in common with the Mafia.

— Giovanni Falcone, 1990

=== Mafias as private protection firms ===
Scholars such as Diego Gambetta and Leopoldo Franchetti have characterized the Sicilian Mafia as a cartel of private protection firms whose primary business is protection racketeering; they use their fearsome reputation for violence to deter people from swindling, robbing, or competing with those who pay them for protection. For many businessmen in Sicily, they provide an essential service when they cannot rely on the police and judiciary to enforce their contracts and protect their properties from thieves (this is often because they are engaged in black market deals).

The Mafia's principal activities are settling disputes among other criminals, protecting them against each other's cheating, and organizing and overseeing illicit agreements, often involving many agents, such as illicit cartel agreements in otherwise legal industries. Mafia-like groups offer a solution of sorts to the trust problem by playing the role of a government for the underworld and supplying protection to people involved in illegal markets ordeals. They may play that role poorly, sometimes veering toward extortion rather than genuine protection, but they do play it.

— Diego Gambetta, Codes of the Underworld (2009)

Scholars have observed that many other societies around the world have criminal organizations of their own that provide the same sort of protection service. In Russia after the breakup of the Soviet Union, the state security system had all but collapsed, forcing businessmen to hire criminal gangs to enforce their contracts and protect their properties from thieves. These gangs are popularly called "the Russian mafia" by foreigners but prefer to go by the term krysha.

With the [Russian] state in collapse and the security forces overwhelmed and unable to police contract law, ... cooperating with the criminal culture was the only option. ... most businessmen had to find themselves a reliable krysha under the leadership of an effective vor.

— Misha Glenny, McMafia (2009)

In his analysis of the Sicilian Mafia, Gambetta provided the following hypothetical scenario to illustrate the Mafia's function in the Sicilian economy. Under this scenario, a grocer wants to buy meat from a butcher without paying sales tax to the government. Because this is a black market deal, neither party can take the other to court if the other cheats. The grocer is afraid that the butcher would sell him rotten meat, and the butcher is afraid that the grocer would not pay him. If the butcher and the grocer cannot get over their mistrust and refuse to trade, they would both miss out on an opportunity for profit. Their solution is to ask the local mafioso to oversee the transaction in exchange for a fee proportional to the value of the transaction but below the legal tax. If the butcher cheats the grocer by selling rotten meat, the mafioso would punish the butcher. If the grocer cheats the butcher by not paying on time and in full, the mafioso would punish the grocer. Punishment might take the form of a violent assault or vandalism against property. The grocer and the butcher both fear the mafioso, so each honors their side of the bargain, and all three parties profit.

=== Mafia-type organizations under Italian law ===
Introduced in 1982 by the Italian Communist Party member and eventual Mafia victim Pio La Torre, Article 416-bis of the Italian Penal Code defines a Mafia-type association (Italian: associazione di tipo mafioso) as one where "those belonging to the association exploit the potential for intimidation which their membership gives them, and the compliance and omertà which membership entails and which lead to the committing of crimes, the direct or indirect assumption of management or control of financial activities, concessions, permissions, enterprises and public services for the purpose of deriving profit or wrongful advantages for themselves or others". In a landmark ruling on 30 March 2010, the Supreme Court of Cassation established that Article 416-bis applied to the 'Ndrangheta.

== List of Mafia-type organizations ==
Map of Italy's main criminal syndicates

Italian criminal organizations include Banda della Magliana and Mafia Capitale in Lazio; Basilischi in Basilicata; Camorra in Campania; Cosa Nostra in Sicily; Mala del Brenta in Veneto; 'Ndrangheta, in Calabria, Sacra Corona Unita in Apulia; Società foggiana, an offshoot of Sacra Corona Unita, in Apulia; and Stidda in Sicily. The 'Ndrangheta is widely considered the richest and most powerful Mafia in the world. However, mafia can also refer to a number of criminal organizations at the international level:

- Albanian mafia
- American mafia
- Armenian mafia
- Azerbaijani mafia
- Bulgarian mafia
- Chaldean mafia
- Chechen mafia
- Chinese mafia
- Corsican mafia
- Galician mafia
- Georgian mafia
- Greek mafia
- Indian mafia
- Irish mafia
- Israeli mafia
- Japanese mafia
- Jewish mafia
- Kurdish mafia
- Lebanese mafia
- Mexican Mafia
- Montenegrin mafia
- Moroccan mafia
- Nigerian mafia
- Pakistani mafia
- Romanian mafia
- Russian mafia
- Serbian mafia
- Slovak mafia
- Turkish mafia
- Ukrainian mafia

== See also ==
The dictionary definition of mafia at Wiktionary

- Crime family
- Five Families
- List of Camorra clans
- List of Chinese criminal organizations
- List of criminal enterprises, gangs, and syndicates
- List of crime bosses
- List of criminal organizations in comics
- List of criminal organizations in DC Comics
- List of criminal organizations in New York City
- List of Italian-American mobsters by organization
- List of Italian Mafia crime families
- List of 'ndrine
- List of Sicilian Mafia clans
- List of Sicilian Mafia members
- Los Angeles crime family

== Bibliography ==
- Albanese, Jay S.; Das, Dilip K.; Verma, Arvind (2003). Organized Crime: World Perspectives. Prentice Hall. ISBN 9780130481993.
- Coluccello, Rino (2016). Challenging the Mafia Mystique: Cosa Nostra from Legitimisation to Denunciation, Palgrave Macmillan. ISBN 978-1-349-55552-9.
- Dickie, John (2007). Cosa Nostra: A History of the Sicilian Mafia. Hodder. ISBN 978-0-340-93526-2.
- Gambetta, Diego (1993). The Sicilian Mafia: The Business of Private Protection. Princeton University Press. ISBN 0-674-80742-1.
- Gambetta, Diego (2009). Codes of the Underworld: How Criminals Communicate. Princeton University Press. ISBN 9780691119373.
- Glenny, Misha (2008). McMafia. Princeton University Press. ISBN 978-1400095124.
- Hess, Henner (1998). Mafia & Mafiosi: Origin, Power and Myth. London: Hurst & Co Publishers. ISBN 1-85065-500-6.
- Lo Schiavo, Giuseppe Guido (1964), Cento anni di mafia (in Italian), Rome: Vito Bianco Editore.
- Lupo, Salvatore (2009), The History of the Mafia, New York: Columbia University Press. ISBN 978-0-231-13134-6.
- Mosca, Gaetano (1901/2015). Che cosa è la mafia? (in Italian), Messina: Il Grano, ISBN 978-88-99045-11-1. See Full text in Italian and the English translation for a background on the publication.
- Mosca, Gaetano (1901/2014). "What is Mafia", M&J, 2014. Translation of the book "Che cosa è la Mafia", Giornale degli Economisti, July 1901, pp. 236–62. ISBN 979-11-85666-00-6.
- Paoli, Letizia (2003). Mafia Brotherhoods: Organized Crime, Italian Style. Oxford/New York: Oxford University Press. ISBN 0-19-515724-9.
- Seindal, René (1998). Mafia: Money and Politics in Sicily, 1950-1997. Copenhagen: Museum Tusculanum Press. ISBN 87-7289-455-5.
- Servadio, Gaia (1976). Mafioso: A History of the Mafia from Its Origins to the Present Day. London: Secker & Warburg. ISBN 0-436-44700-2.
- Wang, Peng (2017). The Chinese Mafia: Organized Crime, Corruption, and Extra-Legal Protection. Oxford: Oxford University Press. ISBN 9780198758402.
