= Social issues in Chinatowns =

Like many other communities, Chinatowns face certain social problems. The early reputation of Chinatowns in the West was that of dilapidated ghettos and slums, sites of brothels, opium dens, and gambling halls. While Chinatowns are generally valued as tourist attractions today, local governments have often sought to generate revenue by commodifying their Chinese identity and encouraging international investment. Paradoxically, such efforts have often contributed to the erosion of their Chinese identity, as gentrification has led to shrinking Chinese populations and the replacement of authentic cultural spaces with businesses catering primarily to tourist expectations rather than the needs of the community.

== Gangs and organized crime ==
In modern times, competing Asian street gangs and organized crime, such as the tongs and the Hong Kong-based triads, continue to plague the metropolitan Chinatowns worldwide where Triads have their operations, including London, United Kingdom; New York City/New Jersey, Los Angeles, San Francisco, Seattle, Chicago, Philadelphia, Las Vegas, and Boston, United States; Sydney, Australia; and Vancouver and Toronto, Canada. Tongs are Chinese secret societies, which were prominent in the 19th and 20th centuries. There have been 'Tong wars' or Chinatown in-fighting, between the Tong groups in the older Chinatowns. A tong war occurred in a Chinatown could be spread to other Chinatown communities. Initially, many Chinatown gangs were formed to defend the community from the lo fahn (Cantonese word and transliteration for "Caucasians") but later turned on members of their own ethnic community. This had a huge impact on the gang.

The Chinatowns of the 1960s and 1970s experiences a rapid influx of working-class immigrants from Hong Kong. Since their inception in the late 1960s, the Hong Kong-born immigrants and mostly unemployed though some work as waiters and busboys Wah Ching (華青) gang members began a campaign of harassment and assault of white tourists in San Francisco's Chinatown, which ultimately proved to be a predicament for the tourism-minded conservative Chinatown elite of the Chinese Consolidated Benevolent Association (the biggest problem is that the CCBA simply advocated tougher policing against the gangs rather than resolve Chinatown social inequalities at the core). In North America, Chinese American street gangs often have connections with the tongs and triads. Examples of such street gangs include the Joe Boys and Jackson Street Boys, which are named after the major street of San Francisco's Chinatown.

Turf wars have been common in the older Chinatowns. Gang rivalry among Chinatown gangs has sometimes have a high profile. As Chinatowns tend to be tourist attractions, tourists in Chinatowns have sometimes been victims of these gang warfare crimes. In 1977, a shoot-out occurred in a San Francisco Chinatown restaurant (where the rival gang were normally based), in which two tourists and three waiters were murdered by stray gunfire in a botched assassination attempt on a Wah Ching gang member. Eleven other people were injured. This incident is notoriously known as the Golden Dragon massacre and it mobilized the San Francisco Police Department to create an Asian crime unit. The five suspects involved in the attack were sentenced and convicted. On June 30, 1995 involved two factions of the Jackson Street Boys. One faction opened fire on the other on a busy Chinatown street, Stockton Street, during the daytime. Seven innocent bystanders were struck, including a pregnant woman. Three males, ages 18, 16, and 14, were arrested in connection with the shooting. Jackson Boys were also the primary trafficker of illegal fireworks back when fireworks were blatantly sold on the streets of Chinatown. In June 1998, shots were fired at Chinese Playground, wounding six teenagers, three of them critically. A 16-year-old boy was arrested for the shooting, which was believed to be gang-related.

Seattle's generally pacific International District-Chinatown was rocked by one particularly spectacular incident of gang violence in February 1983, when the Wah Mee massacre killed 13 people at an illegal gambling club, among them several prominent restaurant owners.

In the late 1970s, some amount of the ethnic Chinese refugees from Vietnam would also start gangs.

In the Los Angeles Chinatown of 1984, Chinese Vietnamese gang members shot and killed a white Los Angeles Police Department officer and wounded his Japanese American partner. The officers were responding to a silent robbery alarm at a Chinatown jewelry store and a shoot-out ensued. The wounded Japanese American officer returned fire, killing three of the five suspects. A three-year trial concluded in 1988, and the remaining killers received the verdict of life imprisonment.

In Chinatown, Manhattan in May 1985, a gang-related shooting injured seven people, including a 4-year-old boy, at 30 East Broadway. Two males, who were 15 and 16 years old and were members of a Chinese street gang, were arrested and convicted.

Suburban Chinatowns are also not entirely immune from extortion. In the so-called "new Chinatown" of Richmond, British Columbia, the Royal Canadian Mounted Police arrested six male suspects in connection with extortion that involved assaulting a Chinese Canadian waiter and then vandalizing the restaurant in 1999. In the summer of 2003, in the Los Angeles County community of San Gabriel, California, Asian gunmen shot out a window of a Chinese restaurant, allegedly to send a message to the owner to pay protection; instead, they killed a waitress, a Mainland Chinese immigrant. Triad extortion activity is also rife in several Chinatowns of Sydney, Australia. Chinese restaurants have especially been targeted in Sydney.

Many Chinese victims in Chinatown and other areas are prostitutes and reluctant to report any incidents of gang harassment to authorities because they fear possible retaliation. First-generation immigrants, who often speak limited English, may be in the country illegally or have a general distrust of the police or of government in general. Many immigrants emigrated from countries where the police routinely intimidate the population—such as with Communist China and Taiwan under President Chiang Kai-shek's martial law—or where the government persecuted the population, as with Thailand and Vietnam. In Hong Kong, until recently, the police were often corrupt and ineffective. [Needs Citation]

Also compounding to the problem is that Chinese immigrant restaurateurs and storekeepers sometimes dismiss the exploitative extortion as another cost of doing business in the form of a "business tax" and thus simply shrug it off. In Hong Kong, Macau, Taiwan, and many areas of Mainland China, extortion is figured into the cost of running a business, and many immigrant business owners presume that it is the same in their newly adopted country as well. [Needs Citation]

== Smuggling of immigrants ==
The triads are also primarily responsible for smuggling illegal immigrants into the Chinatowns of Australia, Europe, and North America, often from China and Vietnam. These Asian smugglers are called "snakeheads". In order to pay for their passage, many of these immigrants end up indentured in "under the table" low-wage (often lower than the minimum wage) service jobs, e.g., as restaurant waiters or dishwashers, masseuses in massage parlors, prostitutes, and garment sweatshops.

Such social problems have been the subject for several Hollywood police films such as The Corruptor (starring Mark Wahlberg and Chow Yun-fat), Year of the Dragon (starring Mickey Rourke) and Revenge of the Green Dragons (executive produced by Martin Scorsese).

== Decaying Chinatowns ==
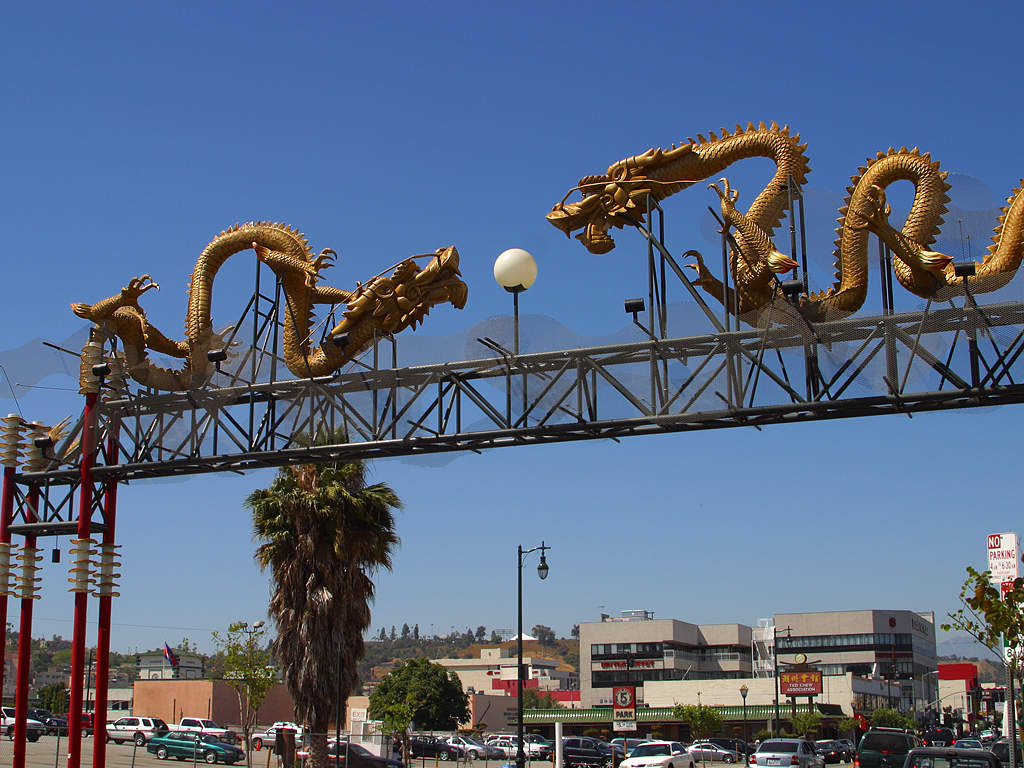
Entryway to Los Angeles Chinatown, facing northwest on Broadway Avenue and Cesar E. Chavez Avenue

Whereas a few Chinatowns, notably the ones in Manhattan and Chicago, have been experiencing population growth and urban renewal, many others (such as San Francisco, Houston and Vancouver) have been facing urban decay over the years. Social ills such as homelessness and drug-related problems occur with some Chinatowns in urban areas. Many (often non-Chinese) unhoused individuals can be observed panhandling on the streets, making them unattractive for investment.

Homelessness has been a problem in the Chinatowns of Honolulu, Los Angeles, San Francisco, and especially Vancouver's Chinatown, which neighbors Downtown Eastside. In Vancouver, Los Angeles, and other cities where the Chinatown is widely perceived as part of an unsafe inner city, few people will venture there at night, so many Chinatown businesses close around 5 or 6 p.m; often only a handful of restaurants remain open. These Chinatowns become virtual ghost towns by evening. By contrast, the vibrant suburban Chinatowns in North America have a bustling nightlife with a number of restaurants with longer business hours, and the Chinatowns in New York City, Seattle, and London remain popular late-night destinations.

There have been programs such as graffiti removal, in which Chinatown community members and the local police work together to improve the safety and aesthetics of Chinatowns, and, as police forces diversify, many have made more successful outreach to Chinatowns than in the past. As a case study, Chinatown in Los Angeles has improved notably in these respects although there has been political wrangling with the Chinatown leaders and city of Los Angeles. However, several revitalization plans have failed to take off due in the past to low funding. Vancouver's Chinatown has attempted to counter parking problems by erecting a large parking structure, but drug problems and perceived police ineffectiveness to clamp down on property crime in Chinatown have hampered efforts.

The exodus of ethnic Chinese from Chinatowns and their gradual acculturation into the larger society has caused some loss of revenue. Elderly Chinese-speaking customers remain in Chinatowns and patronize Chinatown businesses, but without a large immigrant and descendant population to sustain their communities, Chinatowns increasingly rely on tourism. The Chinatown of Havana, Cuba (otherwise known as the barrio chino) with its small and declining population of Chinese origin, promotes its exotic image to the tourist trade.

Social problems aside, several longtime popular and historic Chinese restaurants have also closed in the Chinatowns of San Francisco, Los Angeles, and Toronto, thus leading to the decline.

The old Chinatowns now face heavy competition from the ethnic Chinese and pan-Asian large supermarkets, shopping centers, and mini-malls found in the suburbs. Many old Chinatowns have experienced declining revenue. For example, in California the Chinatowns of San Francisco and Oakland compete with the large shopping centers in Cupertino and Silicon Valley, and the Los Angeles Chinatown faces distinct challenges from the San Gabriel Valley's multiple Chinatowns. With a multitude of acclaimed Chinese cuisine restaurants, the gleaming suburban Chinese Canadian business district of Richmond, British Columbia, has nearly rendered the aging Vancouver Chinatown obsolete for business and revenue, superseding it as the focal point of Chinese culture in greater Vancouver; its influence is felt even across the border in the Puget Sound area. Manhattan's Chinatown continues to grow (having almost completely engulfed Little Italy) but its ever-higher property values have driven many Chinese New Yorkers – both businesses and customers – to the Flushing Chinatown in Queens, not to mention Chinese New Yorkers moving to Parsippany, New Jersey and Edison, New Jersey. In Houston the older Chinatown in Downtown Houston has been largely replaced with a new Chinatown in southwest Houston. In South Africa, Johannesburg Chinatown has fallen victim to crime in that city and is being largely replaced by a new Chinatown in suburban Cyrildene. In Sydney, Australia, there are also multiple quasi "Chinatowns" in the suburbs, notably in the communities of Cabramatta, Chatswood, Parramatta, among others, which are rapidly outpacing the old Chinatown in Sydney proper. New shopping centers in the suburbs of Boston are also replacing Chinatown. With new developments and investments of new shopping centers in the suburbs, many ethnic Chinese immigrants in those areas now do not need to head to overcrowded and congested old Chinatowns to gain access to the goods and services.

Gentrification has reversed decline in Chicago's Chinatown and it may reverse that of Vancouver as well, as the downtown condo tower boom of that city is now moving toward its Chinatown. New upscale 40-story condo towers are being constructed, as are urban retail centres.

Gentrification and urban renewal both have positive and negative aspects. There are fears that non-Chinese-inspired gentrification will change Chinatowns into something entirely different. Hence, there have been various organized vocal opposition and protests in the Chinatowns. Proposals for London's Chinatown include development of posh shops and relocation of its historic pagoda structure. In San Francisco's Chinatown, a proposed development of luxury apartments amidst a large working-class community was thwarted. In Los Angeles, development of an artist colony with non-Chinese-owned art galleries - many have replaced old Chinese American storefronts - in Chinatown has altered the landscape. Toronto's Chinatown is also facing the prospect of inevitable gentrification, with a declining Chinese population. The politics of gentrification has also been felt in the Chinatowns of Philadelphia (where a Philadelphia Phillies baseball stadium was once proposed), Boston, and Washington, D.C. (where the Capital One Arena has significantly shrunk the Chinatown). The local population of Montreal's Quartier Chinois has thwarted a scheme that would have placed a casino within the district. For the most part, Los Angeles's Chinatown has embraced bohemian gentrification without much vocal opposition; Seattle's Chinatown/International District, which has long been more a commercial than a residential neighborhood, has seen a great deal of new construction and some gentrification; nearly all of this recent development is by Asians or Asian Americans, if not always by Chinese.

Across multiple Chinatowns throughout the world, residents and activists have been fighting for their livelihood. New businesses, buildings, or people move within or near these areas, which incites fear amongst these people.

For example, Philadelphia Chinatown has fought since the 1950s to voice their opinions in local development affairs, attempting to resist various constructions of Stadiums, Expressways, and Convention Centers. In 2022, the Philadelphia 76ers proposed a new stadium nearly a block away from Chinatown. This basketball arena would seat 18,500 people, and similarly to the stadium, residents fear that the arena and the influx of people that come along with it would destroy Chinatown.

Additionally, in Chinatown, Manhattan the prices of buildings including rent and the types of building themselves are pushing local businesses and residents out. Many of the residents are low-income or immigrants and with the newly constructed high rises, this affects residents and their cost of living. This change in prices pushes them out and causes various effects for the people of Manhattan’s Chinatown so local groups and activists resist these changes.

Overall, residents in Chinatown, Vancouver and all other Chinatowns fight that provisions should be taken to protect their areas and the deep culture and history that comes with it. As prices start to rise in Chinatowns, the original inhabitants feel foreign or unwelcome in their own towns and some must leave altogether to be able to afford their lifestyle. This leads to the decay of Chinatowns since those who contribute to the culture or remember the historical significance would not be in these areas.

== Urban Renewal ==
Urban renewal during the mid centuries was often driven by economic, social, and aesthetic goals that sought to modernize cities through large scale development. Programs like the Housing Act of 1949, deemed neighborhoods unfit which resulted in the demolition to make way for highways, new housing, and commercial centers. However these projects often resulted in the displacement of low-income families, immigrants, and historic Chinatowns across the U.S. which was a problem because this was posing a threat to many existing neighborhoods that often held significance in cultural landmarks

Many religious institutions like churches and temples were viewed as a stronghold of identity that was a resisting force in urban renewal efforts. These spaces functioned as not only a place for worship but a place for aid, cultural identity, and political organizations.

In Philadelphia for example, the construction of the Vine Street Expressway during the 1960s threatened the heart of Chinatown, including its churches and schools. In response to this they created the Philadelphia Chinatown Development Center (PCDC), which became a key institution for advocacy and cultural preservation. The camping to successfully demonstrate how religious institutions could act as centers of resilience.

This isn’t only seen in Philadelphia but in New York City’s Chinatowns as well, where gentrification and redevelopment are consistently intensifying. Religious spaces including Catholic churches and Buddhist temples have created a sense of belonging to many immigrants providing spiritual support and social services. These institutions amid demographic changes highlights the role of religion being a stabilizing and adaptive force within the community.

Chinatown in other cities, such as Vancouver, have also experienced the effects of urban renewal. Religious institutions continue to serve as a center of resilience, resistance, continuity, and connection for communities facing redevelopment pressure.

== SARS concerns ==
Because Toronto has become the home for a large number of Chinese immigrants, many Chinese Canadians travel to and from Asia on a regular basis. In 2003, several deaths attributed to the outbreak of the SARS (Severe Acute Respiratory Syndrome) virus in Toronto prompted a major scare as it was spread by a Chinese Canadian woman who had visited Hong Kong, contracted the virus during her visit, and died upon her return to Canada. A panic spread across cities with Chinatowns in Canada and in the United States as many Chinese businesses urged people who had recently been traveling in China (where SARS was first reported) or Hong Kong to stay away. In addition, many Chinese restaurants and shopping centers, especially in the Chinatowns of Toronto and Markham, Ontario, saw a reduction in business because of the perceived SARS threat.

As a result, many Chinese Canadians and even Chinese Americans faced an economic impact on their businesses. (During the peak of the hype, several businesses in Chinatowns old and new even capitalized on the fear by selling face masks and SARS "survival kits".) To allay some of the public fears in Canada and worldwide, Canadian Prime Minister Jean Chrétien and Toronto Mayor Mel Lastman had lunch in a Toronto Chinatown restaurant to show that the restaurants and Chinatown in general were safe for tourism.

There were rumors circulating around Chinese communities and the Internet (especially with e-mail chain letters) to avoid certain Chinese restaurants and supermarkets in many urban and suburban Chinatowns because they could allegedly contract the virus. Some authorities have theorized these warnings were initiated by rival competing Chinese businesses. There was no factual basis found for these claims.

== See also ==
- Chinatown
- Criminal tattoos
- List of Chinese criminal organizations
- List of criminal enterprises, gangs and syndicates
- Organized crime
- Tong
- Triad
- Yakuza
- Gentrification
