= One Million Boys =

Robbery gang in Lagos, Nigeria

One Million Boys is the code-name of a robbery gang known for its notorious robbery activities around Lagos and its surroundings. Originally formed in Ajegunle by a group of about 20 boys with the objective of "fighting perceived injustice in the city", some members of the group however hijacked the group into being involved in robbery activities, rape and maiming. A movie titled 1 Million Boyz was released in 2014 based on their thefts and activities. On October 9, 2012, about 130 suspected members of the group were arrested by the Lagos State Police Command during a raid around Apapa and Ajegunle.
