= Somali Outlaws =

- Years active: 2000s-present
- Territory: Cedar-Riverside, Minneapolis, Saint Paul, and Nashville
- Ethnicity: Somali Americans (predominantly); Ethiopian Americans (minority)
- Leader: Mustafa Ali
- Activities: drug trafficking Human trafficking
- Allies: East African Posse
- Rivals: Hot Boyz; Madhiban With Attitude; 1627 Boys

The Somali Outlaws are a Somali American gang. The gang originated in the Minneapolis–Saint Paul metropolitan area.

== History ==
The Somali Outlaws is a street gang consisting of Somali American youths. Mustafa Ali, the leader of the Outlaws, was shot three times in the chest and killed on October 11, 2019.

== Territory ==
The Outlaws' principal territory encompasses the area around the Karmel Mall in south Minneapolis, and in Saint Paul, Minnesota. They are also located in the Cedar-Riverside neighborhood, which has a high concentration of Somali-Americans and Somali immigrants.

== Rival gangs ==
The Outlaws' main rivals are Hot Boyz, Madhiban With Attitude, and 1627 Boys, a gang named after a high-rise apartment building in Cedar-Riverside. A shooting on one gang's turf can be followed hours, and sometimes minutes later, by a shooting in a rival gang's area.
