= South Brooklyn Boys =

New York City street gang

South Brooklyn Boys (SBB)
- Founded: 1950s
- Founding location: Brooklyn, New York, United States
- Years active: 1950s–2000s
- Territory: South Brooklyn, Degraw Street, Union Street, 5th Street, President Street, Sackett Street, Bensonhurst
- Ethnicity: Mostly Italian American
- Membership (est.): 50+
- Criminal activities: Assault, drug trafficking, extortion, bookmaking and murder
- Allies: Italian-American Mafia; Tanglewood Boys; Ozone Park Boys; Gallo Crew (early)
- Rivals: The Jokers, Untouchable Bishops, The Mau Maus, The Fort Green Chaplains, The West Street Boys, Supreme Team

South Brooklyn Boys (abbreviated as SBB) was a famous New York City street gang. In the 1950s, various Italian-American gangs were formed in South Brooklyn, New York City, and came together under the moniker of "South Brooklyn Boys" sometime around the 1950s. The gang had a mostly Italian American membership.

At the time of its origin, SBB consisted of several smaller neighborhood greaser gangs that were located in what are now called Carroll Gardens, Cobble Hill, Park Slope, Red Hook, Gowanus, and Boerum Hill sections of Brooklyn. Some of the gangs that made up the original South Brooklyn Boys were the South Brooklyn Devils, the Garfield Place Boys, the SB Angels, SB Diapers, the Wanderers, the Degraw St boys, the Sackett St Boys, the Butler Gents, the Gowanus Boys, the Kane St. Midgets, The Little Gents, and the Young Savages. The label South Brooklyn Boys represented the loosely connected affiliation that all of these neighborhood gangs associated under.

In practice, these gangs sometimes had bitter disputes and fought with each other. The main body, simply referred to as "South Brooklyn" by many, was located in and around 3rd Street Park, which back in the 1950s was predominantly Italian. A small but fierce gang known as the "Jokers" was a bitter rival, led by a man known as "Cannonball." The two groups fought many times. The Jokers junior set was featured in Bruce Davidson's "Brooklyn Gang" book. Also bitter enemies of SBB were the Puerto Rican Gangs, The Untouchable Bishops, and the Apaches, and the African American gangs The Mau Maus, and the Chaplains.

The 1962 book, All the Way Down: The Violent Underworld of Street Gangs by Vincent Riccio and Bill Slocum, featured real accounts of the Gowanus Boys. The gang was located in the Gowanus section of South Brooklyn, and was one of the earlier neighborhood crews that would evolve into the larger, loosely affiliated South Brooklyn Boys street gang.

Reputed Lucchese mobster Anthony "Gaspipe" Casso was a famous member of the early South Brooklyn Boys, as was Carmine Persico, future head of the Colombo family. The gang has been loosely affiliated with and has worked for the Italian-American Mafia throughout its history to the present, but it is not an official Mafia crew.

Since the 1970s, South Brooklyn Boys has represented not only the original 1950s gangs, but many generations of kids growing up in the traditional South Brooklyn area, most specifically the Italian section of Carroll Gardens and Gowanus. With the recent gentrification in the early 2000s of the Carroll Gardens, Gowanus, and Red Hook area, the gang associated with and largely moved to what is considered the actual geographical south of Brooklyn, including Bensonhurst, Bay Ridge, Dyker Heights, Sheepshead Bay, and Gravesend. The term South Brooklyn Boys has not only been used as a gang association, but also as a loosely connected affiliation for which many neighborhood kids felt a kinship.

== Gang sets ==
The South Brooklyn Boys consisted of 11 different gangs throughout its history.

- South Brooklyn Boys (HQ: 3rd Street Park and 5th Ave) - Parkslope
- South Brooklyn Angels
- South Brooklyn Diapers (5th Avenue & Carroll Street) - Parkslope
- The Wanderers (featured in the film The Wanderers)
- Degraw Street Boys (Degraw Street)-
- Sackett Street Boys (Sackett Street )
- South Brooklyn Devils (Union Street and 4th Ave.)- Park Slope
- Garfield Place Boys (Garfield Place and 5th Ave.)- Park Slope
- Butler Gents (Butler Street and Douglass St, between 3rd and 7th Avenues) Park Slope
- Little Gents (5th Avenue between Union Street & President Street)
- SBB NBA Nomad faction(established 1986 Bensonhurst Dyker Heights Bath Beach Bay Ridge Gravesend) NBA stands for No Blacks Allowed which was added after the Yusef Hawkins murder and protests
