= Abou-Chaker Network =

International criminal organization

Abou Chaker Clan
- Territory: Germany, Berlin, Lebanon, Denmark
- Ethnicity: Palestinian
- Membership: 200-300 members
- Activities: drug trafficking, protection rackets, arms dealing, robbery

The Abou–Chaker Network is a family-based criminal network where many leading members belong to a family/clan with the same name. The use of the family name to denote the criminal network does not imply that the clan itself is criminal or that all of its members are part of the criminal network.

The network consists mostly of male members of the Palestinian Abou–Chaker family in Berlin, Lebanon, and Denmark. Police estimate that 200 to 300 members of the extended family live in Berlin. Parts of the family are involved in organized crime. Members engage in protection rackets, drug trafficking, arms dealing, money laundering, robbery, theft, pimping, and other serious crimes. A court in Berlin has convicted several Abou–Chaker family members for attempting to sell a property with apartments they did not own using forged documents.

The Abou–Chaker network had long business relations with gangster rapper Bushido, who later became a key witness in court proceedings against the clan for criminal charges that arose when the rapper attempted to end the collaboration, claiming that the Abou–Chakers took about 30% of his gross income.

In September 2020, German police conducted raids on residences and businesses in 18 locations in Germany and Switzerland targeting the Abou-Chaker network with a force of 300 officers. The police investigation concerned tax evasion and money laundering.
