= Dinner Set Gang =

Criminal gang in the United States of America

The Dinner Set Gang (aka The Fat Cat Burglars) was a gang of thieves who became notorious in the late 1960s and 1970s for their burglaries of the homes of the wealthiest Americans while the victims were at home eating dinner. Newspapers in New York City and Florida nicknamed them "The Dinner Set Gang".

The principal members of the gang were brothers-in-law Peter Salerno and Dominick Latella. Others included their driver Carmine Stanzione, who was married to Salerno's sister.

== Modus operandi ==
Salerno and Latella observed victims to learn their habits, and often found that the house was largely deserted during the long dinner period because family members stayed at the table. Servants were preoccupied with serving the multi-course meals.

Throughout the year, depending on the season, the elite would drift from Florida to the Northeast United States. The gang followed. While Latella watched the victims dine, Salerno would break into the second story, because “the best jewelry was always upstairs”. He gave himself three minutes to go in, find the jewels, and get out. Latella said that despite the enormous nature of the master suites, Salerno "had a sixth sense about finding [the jewelry]." Latella would warn Salerno with a slight whistle if anything went amiss. They were known for avoiding confrontations at all costs. They carried no weapons and were willing to leave a scene empty-handed if necessary.

== The victims and crimes ==
Salerno and Latella carefully researched their potential victims. They found names in the Forbes list of the wealthiest Americans and looked up addresses in Who's Who in America. Photo spreads from Architectural Digest and Town and Country enabled the duo to case the scenario from a safe distance. Their victims included the DuPonts, the Flaglers, the Wallaces (of Reader's Digest fame) and the Pillsbury family, as well as Liberace, the entertainer.

At their prime, the gang would steal a quarter of a million dollars per job on average. The FBI blamed them for several hundred thefts worth somewhere between $75 million to $150 million in jewels (the exact number of thefts committed by the dinner set gang is uncertain because of the many copycat crimes that may have been falsely attributed to them). Their most impressive heist was executed in 1973 in an exclusive, waterfront community just north of Palm Beach. An heir to the DuPont fortune was renting a house there. Among the sheets in the linen closet of the master bedroom Salerno came across a leather traveling case which contained jewels worth, at that time, approximately $12 million. The largest piece was a 17.65 carats (3.530 g) natural pink flawless pear-shaped diamond, worth about $1,800,000, and same with jewels worth the same price.

The idea of stealing from people while they were home was not something that Peter Salerno came up with on his own accord. He was taught by Frank Bova, a master thief, who learned this skill when he led a Ranger team that stole documents from the Nazis during World War II. To this day, the veteran thief has never been caught.

No one benefited from the concept more than the Gang's fence, Wally Gans. Wally worked in Manhattan's Diamond District on West 47th Street, an area Salerno described as having "more diamonds and cash ... than God." For each piece of jewelry the gang usually received around 10 cents on the dollar which was “the going rate for hot jewelry” at the time. Wally Gans and his wife retired after Latella and Salerno's two biggest jobs.

== Personal lives ==
Salerno and Latella married twin sisters Gloria and Sandra Savino who were from a family with Mafia connections. Despite the fact that the gang only received a fraction of the total retail value of their thefts, there was always plenty of money around. The Savino sisters recall putting "20,000 dollars at a time" in envelopes. They spent the money on everything: cars, clothes, homes, and boats. The money didn't even begin to run out until the 1980s when the duo planned to retire from their lives of crime.

It was in the 1990s that Salerno and Latella came out of retirement. Gloria Salerno had been diagnosed with advanced breast cancer and the Salernos did not have enough money to pay for her treatments. They burglarized roughly 40 houses within several months. By this point, Salerno was "obsessed." Gloria Salerno recovered, but her husband and brother-in-law were finally caught.

== The detectives ==
Bill Adams and Jim Hirsch were two of the detectives assigned in later years to the Dinner Set Gang's case. After working on the case for 20 years, they were able to help track down and identify the pair once the thefts began again. "The Dinner Set Gang" was caught on January 21, 1992 in Westport, Connecticut.

When Salerno entered the house's second story, Latella remembers seeing the woman in the house look up, at which point he knew that she had heard them. Dominick whistled to Pete, who was already on his way out without taking anything. The police surrounded the house and waited. When they couldn't find them, they set dogs out on their trail. Latella and Salerno were both arrested and linked to a series of the other burglaries.

== Recent years ==
Peter Salerno was released from prison in December 2008, and is back with his wife Gloria in Florida.

Dominick Latella also lives in Florida; he is still on parole.

A sociology textbook that included Pete Salerno among others, and focused on burglars and organized crime (The Criminal Elite by Howard Abadinsky) was published by Greenwood in 1983.

A film project is currently in the works through producer Dick Atkins (A-Films) who controls the life story rights.
