= Hildebrando Pascoal =

Brazilian politician

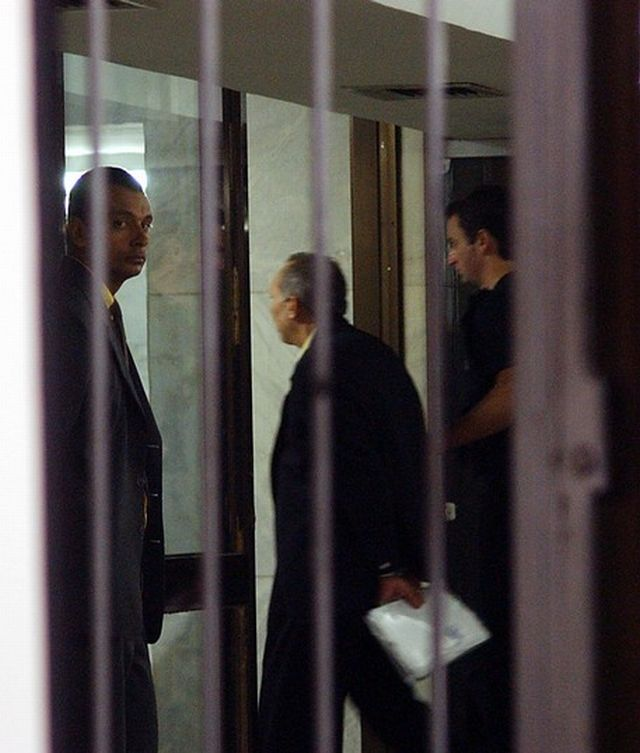
- Hildebrando arriving at Court in custody, in the Federal District, October 2006; Photo:Elza Fiuza/ABr

Personal details
- Born: 17 January 1952 (age 74) Rio Branco, State of Acre, Brazil
- Nickname: The Chainsaw Deputy

Hildebrando Pascoal Nogueira Neto (born January 17, 1952), or simply Hildebrando Pascoal, also widely known as "Deputado Motosserra" (lit. Chainsaw Deputy), is a Brazilian former federal deputy (PFL), former colonel of State of Acre's Military Police and criminal, best known for being sentenced for a series of murders. He was also sentenced for leadership of a criminal organization, drug trafficking, vote swapping and tax evasion.

He was the leader of a death squad responsible for a series of murders carried out with a shocking degree of brutality, most notably due to the fact that, before they were killed, the victims were dismembered with a chainsaw, which is the origin of his alias.

== Crimes and career ==
Hildebrando worked most of his career in the Military Police, earning the rank of commander and then colonel. He then was elected State Deputy in 1994, with the support of Orleir Cameli and Ronivon Santiago (both of whom have also been investigated for corruption). As early as 1995, Brazilian human rights groups and the Ministry of Justice (Brazil) were investigating Hildebrando. During these early periods, there were widespread reports that he dismembered victims with a chainsaw and participated in the drug trafficking trade he was tasked with fighting. However, during this investigation, most of the witnesses were assassinated, including a former accomplice of Hildebrando named Sebastião Crispim. He was found dismembered with his eyes torn out. Another witness was kidnapped with his two sons, ruthlessly tortured, and then killed. Others were killed and then dissolved in acid.

His most famous killing was of the Baiano, Agilson Firmino dos Santos. He was a mechanic that was rumored to have participated in the killing of Hildebrando's brother. He tortured Santos and chopped him to pieces with a chainsaw.

While leading the criminal enterprise in the state, he participated in violent and horrific methods of enforcing his criminal rule. "One witness said he accompanied Mr Pascoal across the border to Bolivia, where the congressman picked up nearly 1,000 kg of cocaine. The same witness said that under orders from his boss, he helped to kill 10 people."

== Attempt at national politics ==
Despite these accusations, Hildebrando was elected as a Federal Deputy to the Chamber of Deputies in 1998. A few months later, in 1999, Hildebrando was forced to resign after official charges were levied against him.

== Sentence ==
In 2006 (and reaffirmed in 2009), Hildebrando was convicted of murder, attempted murder, kidnapping, torture, electoral corruption, leading a death squad in Acre, and coordinating an organized crime operation for drug trafficking and cargo theft. He has been sentenced to serve 18.5 years in prison. However, with cases still pending, he could face more than 100 years.
