= 7th (gang) =

British organized street gang

Black Gaza
- Years active: 2000–present
- Territory: Forest Gate, Newham
- Membership: 50+
- Activities: Drug trafficking, murder, robbery, attempted murder, assault kidnapping,
- Allies: Cashion Park, SouthPark Freestone Blood Gang
- Rivals: GGE, 6th/ACG, PRLane
- Notable members: CB, Whoosh, Yanko (most noticeable), Joints, Y.CB, C1, Capone, Smokez (Deceased)

7th is a street gang based on the Woodgrange Estate in Forest Gate, London.

== History ==
In July 2016, a fight occurred in Stratford Park that resulted in a person being fatally stabbed; his killer was found to have been from Beckton. As a result of the killing, violence would escalate between 7th and ACG - a gang from Beckton - including a fight between the two gangs in summer 2017 in Westfield Stratford City, where an 18-year old was stabbed.

In April 2017, Ahmed "Grinna" Jah was stabbed to death in Canning Town. Grinna's death was noted as having increased tensions between gangs in the north and south of Newham, resulting in several shootings and stabbings in summer 2017 that resulted in the death of CJ.

In September 2017, Corey "CJ" Davis, an affiliate of 7th, was shot and killed in a drive-by shooting. A podcast from The Times alleged that the gunman that killed him was affiliated with the Beckton Boys (or ACG), located in south Newham. In addition, it was found that Issac "Young Dizz" Donkoh, Sabir "Twin S" Rashid, and Hafedh "Twin H" Rashid, all affiliated with the Beckton Boys, were arrested in connection with his murder; however, they were released due to lack of evidence. It was also found that the Beckton Boys used a gang database made by Newham London Borough Council in order to find potential targets; as a result, the Information Commissioner's Office fined the council £145 000.

In November 2017, Kasende Kasongo was found to be affiliated with 7th; he would be convicted of two counts of being concerned with the supply of class A drugs and sentenced to 4.5 years. He would be sentenced to 6 years in prison in 2021 on charges of being concerned with the supply of heroin and cocaine, following him being linked to two county lines operations in Essex.

In 2019, Lekan "CB" Akinsoji and Nathaniel Lewis, both members of 7th, were sentenced to 23 years in prison and 3 years on extended licence, alongside Darnell "D Boy" Joseph-Newill and Troy Ifill, members of the Stratford Gang. The group were under an alliance known as "Northside Newham"; they were riding out to rivals in the E11 postcode when they were pursued by police. Following this pursuit, a gun fight would ensue between police and the Northside Newham members; CB and others were arrested and charged with three counts of attempted murder, possession of a shotgun, possession of a shotgun to endanger life and two counts of possession of a knife. They were found guilty of possession of a firearm with intent to endanger life and conspiracy to cause grievous bodily harm with intent.

== Music ==
7th has a history of music going back to 2012, when members released a five-minute song titled "Who's that Click?", remixing "Who's that Girl?" by Eve. The song was taken down alongside 75 others as a result of Newham hosting the 2012 Summer Olympics; it was later reposted in April 2013. An article in YOUNG noted that the creation of such videos was a noticeable event that would result in the scrutiny of those involved.

Members of 7th are also involved in the UK drill scene, with rappers including CB (short for Cracky Blackz), Y.CB, and YB Gaza. There are also members of BWC, a set of 7th, that are involved in the UK drill scene as well, including Yanko and Joints. Complex mentioned CB as "one of the realest to ever pick up a mic", according to drill scene fans. In 2019, a song made by CB was noted by The Times as having mentioned numerous crimes and having been viewed 45,000 times via YouTube; it was taken down from YouTube at the request of the newspaper. Another song by 7th, hosted on Tim Westwood's YouTube channel, was taken down in 2018.

In 2019, Woosh, a rapper affiliated with 7th, released Gang Unit, which included a feature from Loski. Later that year, CB released A Driller's Perspective. In 2022, he released A Driller's Perspective 2.
