= Hidden Valley Kings =

Neighborhood-based gang in Charlotte, North Carolina

- Founder: Amir Molnar
- Founding location: Charlotte, North Carolina
- Years active: Early 2000s–present
- Territory: Charlotte, North Carolina
- Ethnicity: Afro Egyptian Americans, Afro Hawaiians Americans, African Americans
- Leader: Amir Molnar
- Activities: Drug trafficking, extortion, racketeering, robbery, murder, burglary, assault, battery (crime), illegal gambling, prostitution
- Allies: Zoe Pound

The Hidden Valley Kings are a neighborhood-based gang in Charlotte, North Carolina.

== History ==
The gang was formed in the late 1990s to early 2000s, as a branch of the Queen City Kings, which started in the Cedar Greene housing complex, east of Hidden Valley, near the streets of Craighead and North Tryon. A topic of much debate amongst members and respective outsiders affiliated alike; The Queen City Kings were formed simultaneously by both People Nation and Folk Nation members who moved to Charlotte, North Carolina from Chicago, Illinois in the early to mid 1990s. There was a faction in the Cedar Greene Apartment Complex but as a way to be inclusive of the various universal influences within the growing Supreme King Queen Nation, an agreement was made by all parties involved to change the name of the gang to the Queen City Kings, which played on the nickname of the City of Charlotte, which people dub the "Queen City." The name, according to the Original Kings, was the gang's affirmation to the claiming of the city, stating: "The Queen City is our bitch, which makes us the Kings." Shortly thereafter, several members became federally incarcerated on related and even unrelated offenses. A Cedar Greene Apartments resident named "Corn," often spelled "Korn" to many members and along with Korn's half-brother, was left in charge; Korn proved to be a very charismatic and dedicated leader, remaining loyal to the movement until his suicide, several years later. The Kings, which originally stood for Knowledgeable Islamic Nubian Gods, then renamed Krucial Islamic Nubian Gods, was meant to be a Charlotte, home-grown hybrid blend of Chicago gangs. On the contrary, The Kings shared similarities to Los Angeles gangs, but instead of "Original Gangsta" (OG) or "Baby Gangsta" (BG) the Queen City Kings used "Original King" (OK) or "Baby King" (BK). The Kings, universal color is generally black.

However, Hidden Valley Kings mostly identified with the color green and gold for their neighborhood, the Hidden Valley neighborhood sign is green and Hidden Valley Elementary school colors are green. Just as the nations in Chicago had different branches, or "sets," The Queen City Kings also had what some respective members call quite a number of "empires" or "kingdoms" as well. These sets were actually small groups of members who already lived in different Charlotte low income, crime ridden communities, who were dedicated to spreading the "Kingz" to each of these neighborhoods. Some of them were successful but many of them were unknown in their respective neighborhoods. Among the factions were the Wilmore Kings (WMK), Tuckaseegee Kings (TSK), Beatties Ford Kings (BFK), Maple Run Kings (MRK), North Side Jamaican Kings (NSJK), North Side Kings (NSK), West Side Kings (WSK), Hickory Grove Kings (HGK), South Side Kings (SSK), East Side Kings, (ESK) Grier Town Kings (GTK), Derita Town Kings (DTK), Creek Town Kings (CTK or FOC), Cedar Greene Kings (CGK), Woodview Kings (WVK). With reports of even an Death Valley Kings (DVK) in Polkton, North Carolina with even more recent reports of factions in both Miami, Florida and Rock Hill, South Carolina. Coincidentally, among these other various sets, the Hidden Valley Kings became known as the most prominent. Due to brazen bravado locally and a critically acclaimed Gangland episode titled "Killing Snitches" which led to emulation draw of comparisons via online gaming. The initial occult-like popularity of similarities shared with being extremely small in numbers and sharing the color "green" with the fictitious Grand Theft Auto gaming franchise gang, named "Grove Street Families" was a major contributing factor for the gang's global notoriety.

Eventually, the Hidden Valley Kings gained independence as a gang, as the original concept and philosophy of the Queen City Kings seemed to have died with Korn, the gangs former leader. Korn's half-brother began to get heavily involved in rap and radio (many of the Original Queen City Kings were actually aspiring rap artists, with a full LP to their credit), seemingly leaving the gang life behind. The HVK now represents themselves with black bandanas. In the 2000s the gang's activities consisted mainly of selling narcotics for profit, though Corn often stated that "There are many hustles outside of selling drugs." they began organizing the neighborhood, mimicking the Charlotte-Mecklenburg Police Department, dividing it into three zones. The Hidden Valley Kings don't have many known enemies, but within the neighborhood members have been known to have altercations with the United Blood Nation.

The Hidden Valley kings home base is the Hidden Valley Neighborhood located on the city's northeast side. A small fraction of the gang also dominate a few apartments on West Blvd. But majority of them hangout in their home base neighborhood.

On November 28, 2005, members of the Hidden Valley Kings ran into a rival drug dealer who refused to pay taxes at Eastland Mall. After a shootout in the mall's food court, the victim managed to escape. Later that night, the Kings lured the dealer into a local motel on North Tryon Street as they attempted to ambush the victim. Once again, the victim managed to escape. The Kings chased him down Tryon as the passengers of the two vehicles exchanged fire. After colliding with a telephone pole, the victim ran into a nearby neighborhood. After a brief chase, the Kings eventually caught up to the victim and while cornered, killed him, shooting him point-blank with an AK-47.

The brutal manner in which the murder occurred triggered the Charlotte-Mecklenburg Police Department to begin taking action against the gang. The department put together a Special Operations Unit to take down the Hidden Valley Kings. They gathered informants and followed the Kings for almost two years gathering information on how the gang operated. On March 30, 2007, more than one hundred task force agents arrested over 20 Hidden Valley King members, including the leaders, on multiple charges.
