= Uda Organization =

Israeli crime syndicate

- Territory: Jaljulia and Taibe
- Ethnicity: Israeli Arab/Palestinians
- Activities: contract killings, extortion, murders

The Uda organization or Uda crime family is a prominent crime syndicate operating primarily in Israel, with its headquarters situated in Jaljulia. Led by Koteir (Koko) Uda, also transliterated as Cottier Odeh, the organization has gained notoriety for its swift ascent in the realm of Israeli organized crime.

== History ==
Koteir Uda began his criminal career as a foot soldier in the Hariri organization, a prominent crime family in the Israeli Arab community centered in Tayibe. After branching out on his own, Uda assembled a group of loyal individuals from his neighborhood, forming the Uda organization.

== Activities ==
The Uda organization has been accused of numerous violent crimes, including murders, assassination attempts, extortion, and acts of violence in central Israel. It is alleged that they operate from a heavily fortified compound in Jaljulia. Additionally, there are suspicions that the Uda organization serves as a third-party contractor, hired by other crime groups to carry out contract assassinations.

One notable incident involves Uda's alleged trip to South Africa, where he is believed to have practiced with a sniper rifle in preparation for a planned assassination.

Despite his criminal activities, Koteir Uda is known for having relationships with individuals from different backgrounds. He is romantically involved with a Jewish woman and has close ties with Jewish crime bosses, including Eytan Haya and the Moslis.

The Department of Corrections has linked Uda to recent prison shootings, which were reportedly carried out in retaliation for being denied permission to attend his older brother's funeral, following his death from cardiac arrest.
