= Emmanuel Nwude =

Nigerian businessman

- Born: Nigeria
- Other name: Owelle of Abagana
- Occupation: Businessman
- Known for: Defrauding a Brazilian bank of US$242 million
- Title: Former director of Union Bank of Nigeria
- Criminal information
- Criminal information
- Status: Released in 2006; 20 years ago
- Penalty: 25 years imprisonment
- Accomplices: Emmanuel Ofolue; Nzeribe Okoli; Obum Osakwe; Christian Ikechukwu Anajemba; Amaka Anajemba

Details
- Date apprehended: February 2004; 22 years ago

Emmanuel Nwude Odinigwe is a Nigerian businessman known for defrauding a Brazilian bank of US$242 million to build a fictitious airport.

Nwude formerly served as Director of Union Bank of Nigeria. He defrauded Nelson Sakaguchi, a Director at Brazil's Banco Noroeste based in São Paulo, of $242 million: $191 million in cash and the remainder in the form of outstanding interest, between 1995 and 1998. His accomplices were Emmanuel Ofolue, Nzeribe Okoli, and Obum Osakwe, along with the husband and wife duo, Christian Ikechukwu Anajemba and Amaka Anajemba, with Christian later being assassinated.

After Nick Leeson's trading losses at Barings Bank, and the looting of the Iraqi Central Bank by Qusay Hussein, Nwude's crime was the third largest in banking history. After a large-scale attack on a town in Nigeria in August 2016, Nwude was alleged to be a ringleader and was arrested on murder charges. He was later released.

== Fraud ==
Nwude impersonated Paul Ogwuma, then Governor of the Central Bank of Nigeria, and successfully convinced Sakaguchi, a then director at Brazil's Banco Noroeste, to "invest" in a new airport in the nation's capital, Abuja, in exchange for a $10 million commission. In August 1997, the Spanish Banco Santander wanted to take over the Banco Noroeste Brazil. The fraud was uncovered after a December 1997 joint board meeting, in which an official from Santander inquired about why a large sum of money, two-fifths of Noroeste's total value and half of their capital, was sitting in the Cayman Islands unmonitored.

This led to criminal investigations in Brazil, Britain, Nigeria, Switzerland, and the United States. To guarantee the sale to Santander, the Simonsen and Cochrane families, the owners of Banco Noroeste, paid the $242 million bill themselves. However, Banco Noroeste collapsed in 2001.

Nelson Sakaguchi was later arrested at New York's John F. Kennedy airport and dispatched to Switzerland to stand trial on charges relating to setting up bank accounts there as part of the fraud.

== Aftermath and trial ==
At the request of former Nigerian President Olusegun Obasanjo, the Economic and Financial Crimes Commission was created by the Nigerian Parliament in 2002. In February 2004, Amaka Anajemba, Emmanuel Nwude, Emmanuel Ofolue, Nzeribe Okoli, and Obum Osakwe (Christian Anajemba was deceased at this point), were all arrested and charged in the Abuja High Court with 86 counts of "fraudulently seeking advance fees" and 15 counts of bribery related to the case. They pleaded not guilty. They were immediately cautioned against bribing the court staff by Abuja High Court Judge Lawal Gumi, after he alleged that money was circulating.

The defense team assured that "nothing would be done to bring scandal to the administration of justice." Four Nigerian companies, Fynbaz, Emrus, Ocean Marketing and the African Shelter Bureau also faced charges and pleaded not guilty. In July 2004, Judge Lawal Gumi threw out the case, claiming that since the crime did not take place in Abuja, he had no jurisdiction, and said that the proper place for the case would be the Lagos High Court.

The defendants were immediately rearrested after stepping outside the courthouse and the case was moved to Lagos. In 2005, Nwude attempted to bribe Nuhu Ribadu, then head of the commission, with $75,000 cash. He was charged in connection with the attempted bribery in addition to the attempted kidnapping of a prosecution witness. In July 2005, Amaka Anajemba admitted to helping Anajemba and was sentenced to two and a half years in prison and ordered to repay $25.5 million.

During Nwude's trial, there was a bomb scare that caused the courthouse to be evacuated. Emmanuel Nwude and Nzeribe Okoli pleaded guilty after testimony from Sakaguchi in hopes of a more lenient sentence, and were sentenced to 29 years in prison collectively, with Nwude receiving five consecutive sentences of five years, totaling 25, and Okoli receiving four. The entirety of Nwude's assets were confiscated to be returned to the victim and a $10 million fine was imposed to be paid to the Nigerian federal government. It was the first major conviction for the EFCC. He was released from prison in 2006.

Nwude filed a lawsuit to recover his seized assets after he was released from prison, on the grounds that some of the assets were acquired before the offense was committed. He has already reclaimed at least $52 Million. As of May 8, 2015, the matter is being heard by the Lagos Division of the Court of Appeal.

== Developments ==
On August 19, 2016, the town of Ukpo in the Dunukofia area was attacked by over 200 people, apparently due to a land dispute with the neighboring Abagana community. Four policemen were shot, and Emmanuel Okafor, a security guard at a construction site, was killed. The Anambra State Police Command alleged that Nwude was a ringleader, and arrested him on 27 charges including murder, attempted murder, and terrorist attacks. He was being held at Awka Prison in Anambra State, but was released on bail on December 8, 2016.

He is the president-general of Ugbene town union.

On 25 February 2021, while testifying before Justice Mojisola Dada of the Ikeja Special Offences Court, Nwude denied knowing the source of the $242m that was transferred into his account. Mr. Nwude, after serving part of his 25 year jail term, is back in court alongside two lawyers – Emmanuel Ilechukwu and Roland Kalu.

All three face a 15-count charge of forging the documents of a property Justice Oyewole had earlier ordered Nwude to forfeit to his victims. The property is located at Plot Y, Mobolaji Johnson street, Oregun Alausa, Ikeja, Nigeria. Justice Mojisola Dada adjourned the case until 24 May 2021, for continuation of trial.

== See also ==
- Nigerian organized crime
- Confidence trick
