= Organized crime in Minneapolis =

Prevalent American criminal organizations and activities in Minneapolis

Organized crime in Minneapolis refers to the illegal activity of the early 20th century in Minneapolis. This issue was first brought to public attention by Lincoln Steffens in the book The Shame of the Cities which chronicles the widespread corruption in major political parties in the 19th century and the continued efforts to fix this ongoing issue. A. A. Ames was a notable figure who was exposed due to this book, as he and the Minneapolis police force were caught dealing with illegal businesses syndicates. In 1902, Ames fled to Indiana and resigned as mayor on the 6th September.

In his memoir Augie's Secrets, Twin Cities journalist Neal Karlen concedes that the power temporarily wielded in Minneapolis by Jewish-American organized crime figures like Kid Cann and David Berman beginning in the Prohibition-era gave a major boost to local anti-Semitism, for which Minneapolis became infamous nationwide. Karlen further argues, however, that the pervasive criminality during Mayor Ames' last term demonstrates that the city of Minneapolis was even more corrupt when Scandinavians and White Anglo-Saxon Protestants were still running it.

== See also ==
- Crime in Minnesota
- Crime in the United States
- A. A. Ames
