= Garduña =

Fictional late Middle Ages criminal secret society in Spain

The Garduña is a mythical organized, secret criminal society said to have been founded in Spain in the late Middle Ages. It was said to have been a prison gang that grew into a more organized entity over time, involved with robbery, kidnapping, arson, and murder-for-hire. Its statutes were said to have been approved in Toledo in 1420 after being founded around 1417.

Spanish historians León Arsenal and Hipólito Sanchiz have traced all references to the Garduña back to the 19th-century book Misterios de la inquisición española y otras sociedades secretas de España by Víctor de Fereal (maybe a pseudonym for Madame de Suberwick) and Manuel de Cuendías, published in 1850. Arsenal and Sanchiz doubt the Garduña ever existed.

As a secret society, the Garduña is very attractive for conspiracism, according to the historian Sanchiz. It was supposedly active for over 400 years in Spain, and, among other things, it supposedly carried out the dirty work of the Inquisition. In serious Spanish studies about bandolerismo (outlaws) and social disorders (very frequent in Andalusia in the 19th century), there is not a single mention of the Garduña.

According to historian John Dickie, the Garduña was a fictional organisation that appeared from nowhere in a very popular French pulp novel published in 1845. The author probably based the story on Miguel de Cervantes’ short story "Rinconete and Cortadillo". An Italian translation in 1847 spread the myth in Italy.

The Garduña is the foundational myth across all Italian mafias. One such myth claims that the Garduña was a precursor to the Neapolitan Camorra, a crime syndicate active to this day in southern Italy and was transplanted when Spain controlled Naples and much of its criminal element was transported (or deported) there.

A Calabrian folk song suggests a much larger legacy. It tells the story of three Garduña "brothers" or three Spanish knights, Osso, Mastrosso and Carcagnosso, who fled Spain in the 17th century after washing with blood the honour of their seduced sister. They were shipwrecked on the island of Favignana, near Sicily. From there Osso supposedly founded the Sicilian Mafia, Mastrosso the Camorra, and Carcagnosso the Calabrian 'Ndrangheta. It is a persisting myth told to Calabrian recruits when they prepare to adhere to the local 'Ndrangheta clan.

Additionally, the circumstances surrounding the original shipwreck seem to suggest their main occupations as pirates, and alludes to a connection with pirates throughout the Spanish Empire, including the Americas. Similar traditions are told of three Buddhist monks founding the Chinese Triads.

== See also ==
- Germanía, the jargon of Spanish criminals in the 17th century.
- "Rinconete y Cortadillo" is a short novel by Miguel de Cervantes about a Thieves' Guild operating in Seville.
