= Loomis Gang =

Family of outlaws

The Loomis Gang was a family of outlaws who operated in Central New York during the mid-19th century. The patriarch of the gang, George Washington Loomis, was a descendant of the immigrant Joseph Loomis, who arrived in the Massachusetts Bay Colony from England in the early 17th century.

== Early and growth ==
George Washington Loomis Sr. (1779–1851) and his wife Rhoda Mallet (1793–1887), are considered to be the founders of the Loomis Gang of outlaws. Rhoda was the daughter of Zachariah Mallet, an officer in the French Revolutionary army. He had embezzled money from the French government, and fled to the United States with his family to avoid arrest. He was arrested and sent to prison in 1812.

In 1806, Loomis Sr. bought property in Hubbardsville, Madison County, near the Nine-Mile Swamp. He married Rhoda Marie Mallet in 1814. The couple had twelve children. Their early activities included horse theft and minor counterfeiting. The large farm that they lived on was generally profitable. The family engaged in more criminal activities as the children grew older. Taught by Rhoda, the children began pulling off petty thefts while fairly young. As the children aged, in the mid-1830s, the Loomis Gang delved further in crime. The children were well-educated, with Wash Loomis reading law with a local judge.

Wash became the head of the Loomis crime organization in the early 1840s. He expanded the organization into a multi-state syndicate, which consisted of regions north, south, east, and west of their farm. Bill Loomis managed the northern region in Hastings Center; he directed a ring of horse thieves and sold the horses in Canada. Grove Loomis managed a ring of horse thieves in the southern region while an associate, Bill Rockwell, led a similar set up in the western region. Wash directed activities in the eastern region.

The sons specialized in theft of horses and livestock rustling, among other illegal activities. They dealt in stolen goods, burglaries, and counterfeit money. The Loomis family was the nucleus of a gang composed of youths from their area, as well as criminal elements from elsewhere. They were successful enough, both in crime and legitimate agriculture, to be able to buy protection from the authorities.

For many years, the Loomis Gang was careful to cultivate the goodwill of their neighbors; they generally did not steal from people who lived near them. When their neighbors suffered from thefts, those who went to the Loomis farm for help often received aid in recovering their property. This aid helped ensure that the locals would not be willing to give evidence against the Loomis Gang to outside authorities attempting to gather evidence against the family and its associates. Most people were either in the Loomis' debt or afraid of them. Anybody who complained to the law about the Loomis' activities ran the risk of mysterious fires on their property, and the Loomis Gang always had plausible alibis.

Occasionally a member of the Loomis family or an associate would be arrested. However, between bribed officials, the Loomis' excellent lawyers, and their willingness to make sure that inconvenient paperwork or evidence disappeared, they almost always avoided conviction.

== Raid and decline ==
In 1849, exasperated local people managed to obtain official sanction for a large raid on the Loomis farmstead, finding twelve sleigh-loads of stolen goods. The Loomis Gang had become overconfident, keeping the goods at their farm rather than hiding them in the nearby Nine-Mile Swamp, which was a convenient location for storing stolen goods. The Loomis Gang avoided conviction, due to confusion about who had stolen what and who owned what goods, but Wash decided to leave the vicinity for a while. Along with thousands of other men, he migrated West to try his luck in the California gold fields during the California Gold Rush.

A few years later, Wash returned, and the Loomis Gang was back in business. Gang members had kept a low profile while he was gone, since he was the acknowledged brains of the outfit. Despite increased pressure from people such as Roscoe Conkling, the Loomis Gang continued operations very much as before, until 1865. They took advantage of the American Civil War in various ways, mainly by large-scale horse theft for sale to the Union Army.

In 1865, things rapidly came to a head. Many men from the area were veterans of the Union Army, and four years of war had made them less willing to yield to the gang's intimidation and bullying. A mob attacked the Loomis farm under the direction of James Filkins, a blacksmith and outspoken opponent of the gang, who had become the constable of Sangerfield; in the conflict, Wash Loomis was killed. At first, the gang tried to carry on as before, but people had lost much of their fear of the outlaws' power. In 1866, another mob attacked their farm, burning the house and half-hanging Amos "Plumb" Loomis, in retaliation for depredations that had been laid at their door. After that, the Loomises went downhill fast; they lost their farm to tax arrears and faded into obscurity. Rhoda, Denio, and Cornelia spent their final years at Hastings, New York. With Denio, their home was on U S Route 11, across from the Bardeen one-room schoolhouse.

== Legacy ==
The Loomis family descendants may be found in Central New York to this day. Many are proud of their descent from what was, in its time, the largest family criminal syndicate in the United States.

A legend in the neighborhood of their farm is that Wash Loomis' last words predicted violent death to any non-Loomis person who tried to own their farm. Other legends speak of Wash Loomis' ghost appearing, portending death to someone, and of spectral horsemen riding the roads on October nights for revelry where the Loomis farm once stood.

George Washington Loomis, through the influence of his wife, Rhoda Marie Mallet, was considered to have disgraced the entire Loomis family in America, by that time quite large. Virtually every relative for the next hundred years took great pains to distance themselves and their own families from the highly distasteful matter.

The poet Ezra Loomis Pound was descended from the Loomis family and supposedly changed his name from Loomis to Weston, his mother's name, to distance himself from the criminal gang.
