= Aava Gang =

Sri Lankan outlaw motorcycle club

The Aava Gang was a Sri Lankan motorcycle street gang, active in the Northern Province of the island. The group is indicated to be around 60 members, between the ages of 18 and 25. The leader of the group is nicknamed ‘Haava’ (‘rabbit’ in Sinhalese) is known under the name Aava. This is due to the lack of pronunciation of 'H' sound in Dravidian language speech. A total of 38 members, including the leader, have been informed to the parliament to have been arrested to date.

Since the end of the Civil War, there have been a large increase in drug trade, sexual and gang violence, and robberies in Jaffna. The group emerged after the end of the war, under unknown origins.

The gang took credit for the attack on two police intelligence officers in Chunnakam and left leaflets under the names "Prabaaharan Padai", "Sangiliyan Padai" and "Ellalan Padai" demanding the police to leave the Northern Province as revenge for the death of two Jaffna University students, who were killed in a police shooting on the night of 20 October 2016 in Kokkuvil and the police attempted to cover up as an accident. The sword wielding gang has been suspected to have been engaged in other crimes including robbery and kidnapping.

UNP MP Rajitha Senaratne accused the Rajapaksas of being behind the Aava gang and accused them of creating the gang to create fear among civilians in the Northern Province. However no evidence was provided and the Aava gang had been active for years as a gang of petty criminals and only gained national attention after its attack on police officers. The group is also believed to have been influenced by South Indian films. The Adayaalam Centre for Policy Research calls on government to put an end to the use of the Prevention of Terrorism Act to address gang violence in Jaffna and to release individuals held under the PTA for alleged involvement in the Aava gang.

== See also ==
- Crime in Sri Lanka
- Gangs in Sri Lanka
