= Sword Boys =

- Founded: 1990s
- Founding location: Perth, Western Australia
- Territory: Perth, Western Australia
- Ethnicity: Lebanese Australians
- Activities: Drug trafficking

Sword Boys is a street gang in Perth, Western Australia, consisting mostly of Lebanese Australians, that has been known to authorities since mid-1990s. Gang members have been reported to wear a miniature gold scimitar on a chain around their necks.

Sword Boys has been responsible for amphetamine and ecstasy distribution in Western Australia, and has also been linked to car rebirthing by Western Sydney gangs, where stolen cars are stripped and reassembled.

== 2014 arrests ==
In 2014 brothers Ziad Jneid and Rabih Jneid were arrested and charged as part of a drug syndicate coordinating the distribution of drugs (4 kg [8.8 lb] of crystal methamphetamine) across the Perth metropolitan area. They were charged with conspiracy to sell or supply a prohibited drug. Two other men also charged with supplying a prohibited drug. Ziad Jneid has repeatedly denied any role in a Lebanese mafia operating in Perth called the Sword Boys.

== 2016 convictions ==
On 31 August 2016, Ziad Jneid and Rabih Jneid were convicted and sentenced by the Perth District Court after both pleading guilty before trial for their roles in the supply of almost 2 kg (4.4 lb) and almost 1 kg (2.2 lb), respectively, of methylamphetamine in 2014. Ziad Jneid received fourteen-and-a-half years' imprisonment and Rabih Jneid received 15 years' imprisonment. Both were described as being upper-echelon drug suppliers motivated by greed. The brothers have links to a notorious Perth Asian street gang jailed for their involvement in the 2013 extortion of a karaoke bar.
