= Mali Boys =

British organised street gang based around Leyton and Walthamstow in East London

- Years active: 2015–present
- Territory: Leyton, Walthamstow - E10 and E17 in East London
- Ethnicity: Black British
- Membership (est.): 60–100
- Criminal activities: Drug trafficking, murder, robbery, attempted murder, assault grand theft
- Allies: Boundary, Coppermill, Drive & Marlowe (DM), Stoneydown
- Rivals: Beaumont Crew / Let’s Get Rich (LGR), Priory Court (PC) / Higham Hill, CGM, Anyone Can Go (ACG), Custom House (CH), Peckwater (51st)

The Mali Boys, also known as MaliStrip or Mali Strip, (Note: St James St, Walthamstow is an 'open' drug market area used by the gang and referred to as 'Mali Strip'. The Mali Boys claim this area as theirs and use the name in their music.) are an organised street gang based in Leyton and Walthamstow, East London, particularly the postcodes E10 and E17. They are known to control the drug trade in the area with violence. In 2019, they were reported to have around 40-50 members and were reported to be responsible for hundreds of violent attacks and a number of killings, leading to the gang's reputation for extreme violence. The gang is named after Somalis (due to many of their founding members being of Somali descent), however, the gang is ethnically diverse, though it is predominantly male. In a report commissioned by the local Waltham Forest council, the gang was described as "the most business driven, violent and ruthless" street gang in Waltham Forest. Unlike many other street gangs, the Mali Boys are not active on social media and seek anonymity, though it has been reported they use Facebook to monitor police officials. The gang has connections with other organised crime groups in London, and operates county lines drug networks. The gang is involved in criminal child exploitation and the grooming of young children.

Many smaller local gangs are in alliance or have been subsumed into the Mali Boys, such as Drive & Marlowe (DM), Boundary, Coppermill, and Stoneydown. In 2018, it was reported that police sources estimate the gang generates approximately £50,000 per week from its drug sales.

== History ==
The Mali Boys emerged in 2015 after it splintered off from the Beaumont Crew gang.

On 14 March 2018, Joseph Williams-Torres was shot and killed in Walthamstow, East London by members of the Mali Boys. Joseph Williams-Torres had mistakenly been identified as a gang member and was not the intended target. Prosecutor Allison Hunter QC said the killing was part of a set of related and retaliatory acts of violence rooted in a dispute between rival groups. In particular, violence had begun to escalate after Mali Boys member Elijah Dornelly was murdered in May 2017. The Mali Boys were reported to be in a 'turf war' with a group known as Priory Court or Higham Hill. One of the defendants accused of murder, Hamza Ul Haq, had previously been squirted with acid in November 2017, while another member of the Mali Boys was stabbed by a group of individuals in Walthamstow.

In December 2018, Daniel Fakoya, a member of rival gang Priory Court, and two other men drove a stolen car into Leyton High Road, territory of the Mali Boys. They were armed with a loaded gun, a knife, and ammonia. They encountered and chased four members of the Mali Boys until they ran and hid inside an off-licence. Daniel was later sentenced to 15 years in prison for the offence.

On 8 January 2019, 14-year old Jaden Moodie was stabbed to death nine times by a group of Mali Boys members in Leyton, East London. Jaden was associated with rival gang Beaumont Crew (also known as Let's Get Rich) and was allegedly out drug dealing at the time of death. Mali Boys members drove into his scooter and stabbed him as he lay on the ground. Ayoub Majdouline was sentenced to life in prison with a minimum term of 21 years and 18 months to run concurrently as a result of the murder. Ayoub Majdouline had previously been identified as a victim of modern slavery by the National Crime Agency.

In November 2021, five members of the Mali Boys were found guilty of supplying class A drugs to Essex.

== Music ==
Members using the group name, MaliStrip, are active within the UK drill and trap music scenes. This includes artists such as Richi, Baby Mane, Ridla, L’blacko, and RondoMontana. The group was named by VICE as having played a role in the exposure of Somali rap artists.
