= Molasses Gang =

Street gang from the 1870s

The Molasses Gang was a New York street gang during the 1870s, best known for unusual store robberies and pickpocket crime.

Formed in 1871 by Jimmy Dunnigan, the Molasses Gang were primarily made up of sneak thieves and minor criminals who were highly publicized in the New York press for the comedic methods of their robberies. One such tactic was to enter a local store and ask the owner to fill a member's hat with molasses, explaining that it was a bet among the other members to see how much molasses the hat would hold. When the hat was filled, the gang member would pull the hat over the shop-owner's head, blinding him while the gang members looted the store. The gang was not taken very seriously among the other gangs of the period, however, and often walked out in the middle of robberies when such activities bored them. As the gang continued to commit similar crimes, police decided to take action and by 1877 most of the gang had been arrested.

Molasses Gang members included:

- Blind Mahoney (Leader)
- Billy Morgan (Captain)
- Jimmy Dunnigan (Captain)
