= Green Street Counts =

The Green Street Counts were a street gang in Philadelphia, Pennsylvania. The gang's turf centered at the corners of 21st and Green St. where their numbers were usually seen. They specialized in armed robbery, kidnapping, and weapons dealings.

According to Detective Captain James Kelly, they were, "the most menacing gang of teenagers" in Philadelphia. The Green Street Counts were active in the early 1950s.

Among the gang, Joseph "Blackie" Battel, would go on to serve a life sentence for a robbery murder. This put the Green Street Counts in local and national headlines. Along with his co-defendants, Blackie would receive a commutation from the PA Parole Board after serving a lengthy amount of time at the Eastern State Penitentiary. After their release the Counts would later connect with the K&A Gang of Philadelphia's Kensington section.

== West Philadelpha Counts ==
Around the same time (early to mid-1950s) another group of teenagers in Philadelphia took the name Green Street Counts (West). This group of teenagers led by Carlos was operating in a West Philadelphia neighborhood extending from 38th to 47th Streets and Walnut Street to Woodland Avenue. The Green Street Counts (West) were not affiliated with the Green Street Counts originally from the Fairmount section of Philadelphia.
