= Bowe Brothers =

New York City-based organized crime group

- Founded: c. 1840
- Founded by: Martin Bowe
- Founding location: New York City, New York, United States
- Years active: 1840-1860
- Territory: New York waterfront
- Ethnicity: Irish-American
- Membership (est.): 6 (est.)
- Criminal activities: Organized crime

The Bowe Brothers were a criminal family in New York City during the early-to-mid-19th century. The gang was headed by Martin Bowe, owner of the sailors' home Glass House at Catherine Slip, a docking place for boats and ferries on the East River in Manhattan, and included Jack, Jim and Bill Bowe. All were well-known shooters, cutters and thieves in New York's Fourth Ward and often led waterfront thugs in raids on dockyards and ships anchored in the East River. The brothers were also fences and disposed of money obtained by other waterfront gangs.

One of their men, Jack Madill, served as a bartender at the Glass House for over a year before his arrest for the murder of his wife. He had killed her in an argument when she refused to help him rob a drunken sailor and was sentenced to life imprisonment
