= Tenth Avenue Gang =

New York street gang

The Tenth Avenue Gang was a New York City street gang and later became the city's first train robbers.

Formed by Ike Marsh in 1860, the gang consisted of a small number of various burglars and other criminals. In response to the first train robbery by the outlaw Reno Gang in 1866, the Tenth Avenue Gang became the first street gang to commit a train robbery in Manhattan in 1868 when Marsh and several members boarded a Hudson River Co. train at Spuyten Duyvil in Upper Manhattan and, making their way into the mail car, held the guard captive and stole $5,000 in cash and bonds which was thrown out of the train. The robbery would gain the gang considerable notoriety from both the New York press and the city's underworld as Ike Marsh was said to have stated the gang was "just as good as those cowboys.". The gang continued to successfully raid New York rail yards however by the early 1870s the gang was forced to merge with the Hell's Kitchen Gang as railroad detectives had killed several members.
