= Jheri Curls =

New York City gang

- Founder: Martinez brothers
- Named after: Jheri curl
- Years active: Early 1990s
- Territory: Washington Heights, Manhattan, New York, USA
- Ethnicity: Dominican
- Leader: Rafael Martinez

The Jheri Curls were a Dominican gang which was active in the Washington Heights, Manhattan neighborhood of New York City in the early 1990s. Taking their moniker, and coiffures, from the Jheri curl hairstyle that was of waning popularity in the United States during the time, the gang ran a major cocaine trafficking operation in upper Manhattan which was ultimately based out of an apartment complex on W. 157th St. and Riverside Drive. The gang was led by Rafael Martinez along with his brothers Lorenzo, Julian, Daniel, and Cesar. The Jheri Curls pulled in millions of dollars per year in cocaine sales (allowing the Martinez brothers to live comfortably in Queens), and gang leader Rafael was able to secrete some of the money in properties in the Dominican Republic.

Despite their seemingly non-threatening name, the Jheri Curls were known and feared in Washington Heights for their extreme violence—Rafael Martinez reportedly shot his girlfriend in the kneecap when she made fun of his limp—and in particular for the murder of Jose Reyes, a 67-year-old resident of the apartment building at 614 W. 157th St which served as the gang's base of operations. Reyes, who was retired from the city's welfare department, had confronted the gang members about their illicit activities and began aiding the police. Soon after, on May 23, 1991, Reyes was shot to death outside of a bank in broad daylight.

Though no one was ever convicted of the crime (two members of the gang were tried and acquitted), Reyes's murder led to increased police investigation of the Jheri Curls and ultimately to the gang's penetration by several undercover officers. In October 1991, Rafael Martinez, his brothers, and other members of the gang were arrested on multiple charges stemming from their cocaine business. Many received stiff sentences, including Rafael Martinez, whose convictions added up to 213 years in prison. The successful crackdown against the Jheri Curls was part of a larger effort in New York City to arrest and prosecute violent Dominican gangs that would ultimately be extended to crews like the Wild Cowboys and the Young Talented Children.
