= Broadway Mob =

New York bootlegging gang during Prohibition

The Broadway Mob was a New York bootlegging gang during Prohibition. Although headed by Joe Adonis, the gang’s day-to-day operations were handled by Charles "Lucky" Luciano and Frank Costello as well as financially backed by Arnold Rothstein. During Manhattan's bootleg wars, Rothstein would bring in the Bugs and Meyer Mob, led by Meyer Lansky and Bugsy Siegel, to protect alcohol shipments.

As Luciano and Lansky had previously worked together prior to Prohibition, Meyer and Siegel were made partners in the Judeo-Italian criminal organization. By the late 1920s, the Broadway Mob supplied some of the highest quality whiskey to several New York speakeasies, including Sherman Billingsley's Stork Club, the Silver Slipper, Jack White's, and Jack and Charlie's 21 Club, among others. Even its lesser quality alcohol imported from Philadelphia mobster Waxey Gordon was considered far superior to the rotgut liquor supplied by the rest of New York's underworld.

At the suggestion of Rothstein, the Broadway Mob bought interests in several popular speakeasies and nightclubs which would lead to purchasing valuable real estate in Manhattan. Its operations were eventually absorbed into the criminal syndicate under Luciano and Lansky, following the repeal of Prohibition in 1933.
