= Honeymoon Gang =

Coordinates: 40°44′41″N 73°59′7″W

- Founding location: East Side, Manhattan, New York City, New York
- Years active: Mid-19th century
- Territory: 18th Ward, East Side, Manhattan, New York City
- Ethnicity: Irish and Irish-American
- Membership (est.): ?
- Criminal activities: street fighting, knife fighting, assault, murder, robbery

The Honeymoon Gang was a New York street gang of the mid 19th century. The gang was said to be so violent that they were denied protection often received by other street gangs from Tammany Hall politicians.

Operating out of New York's East Side 18th Ward, the gang was notorious for their brutal attacks, especially on unsuspecting passersby at the corners between Madison Avenue and 29th Street. Known as "basher patrols," these attacks were usually celebrated later at a local tavern. The attacks were so frequent that the neighborhood was considered unsafe for several years.

The gang continued to control the 18th Ward with little, if any, interference from authorities until 1853, when New York Police Chief George W. Walling became Captain of the district. He formed a group of handpicked men, later known as the Strong Arm Squad. They were dressed in plainclothes and sent into the 18th Ward. Armed with "locust clubs," these officers would attack gang members awaiting their victims, and after several days the gangs were forced to abandon their attacks. However, Walling obtained identifications of the gang members and distributed them to each of the district policemen, who attacked and beat gang members on sight. In less than two weeks the Honeymoon Gang had been disbanded and its remaining members fled to neighborhoods with less police presence.

Some of the exploits of the Honeymoon Gang are dramatized in Chapter XVIII of MacKinlay Kantor's Pulitzer Prize-winning novel "Andersonville" (1955).
