= 19th Street Gang =

1870s street gang in New York City

The 19th Street Gang was a New York City predominantly Irish street gang during the 1870s known as a particularly violent anti-Protestant gang.

The 19th Street Gang, made up mostly of young pickpockets, muggers, and sneak thieves, was led by a young man known as Little Mike. Operating around New York's 19th Street to 34th Street, known as "Poverty Lane", the gang mainly robbed defenseless victims, such as the elderly, as well as women and children; however, the gang was sometimes said to spare local Catholics, often asking victims to give their baptismal name, recite psalms, their local church, and other questions.

By the end of the 1880s, the gang had disappeared entirely.
