= Formby Gang =

- Founded: 1890s

The Formby Gang was an early Chicago juvenile street gang during the early 1900s from which many of the city's later gangsters would arise during prohibition.

One of the most violent street gangs in Chicago's history, the Formby Gang was formed in the late 1890s by teenagers Jimmy Formby, with Bill Dulfer and David Kelly, organizing hundreds of burglaries and armed robberies throughout the city before eventually being hired out for murder. After several years the gang quickly dissolved in 1904, shortly after gang leader Jimmy Formby was convicted for the murder of a street car conductor as well as Dulfer for murdering two men during the robbery of a saloon, and imprisoned.
