= Tub of Blood Bunch =

1860s criminal organization in New York City

The Tub of Blood Bunch was an early New York waterfront street gang of the late 1860s.

A collection of criminals made up of gang members from the various New York street gangs following the "cleanup" of the Fourth Ward by police shortly after the American Civil War, the Tub of Blood Bunch included members such as Skinner Meehan, Dutch Hen, Jack Cody, Sweeney the Boy, Brian Boru and Hop Along Peter. Operating from a local bar, aptly named the Tub of Blood, the gang dominated the Corlears' Hook section of the East River waterfront. Sweeney the Boy and Brian Boru in particular regularly robbed pedestrians for as simple reasons as a change of clothes. While the fates of the gang are unknown, Brian Boru was said by one account to have fallen asleep in a drunken stupor outside the tavern and, presumably, killed by unknown assailants during the night, as he was found the following day nearly half eaten by dock rats.

One of the prominent members of the gang, Hop Along Peter, was often hired by gangsters as a lookout during crimes, supposedly for his near pathological hatred of police officers, randomly attacking police officers on sight, usually allowing the other gangsters to escape. A feared "cop fighter" of New York's East Side for almost two decades, after his disappearance in the 1880s the last of the Tub of Blood Bunch faded into obscurity. The Tub of Blood, the last reminder of the gang, eventually closed down shortly after due to bankruptcy.
