= Swamp Angels =

1800s New York City waterfront street gang

- Founding location: Gotham Court, Cherry Street, Lower Manhattan, New York City, New York, present-day Manhattan, New York City, New York
- Years active: 1850s–1890s
- Territory: Gotham Court, Cherry Street, Lower Manhattan, New York City, New York, present-day Manhattan, New York City, New York
- Ethnicity: Irish and Irish-American
- Membership (est.): ?
- Criminal activities: robbery of waterfront ships and using the sewers, as an escape route, allowing them to sell their stolen cargo immediately

The Swamp Angels were a New York City waterfront street gang during the mid-nineteenth century.

One of the most successful waterfront gangs of the mid-late 19th century, the "Swamp Angels" dominated the dockyards of New York Harbor from the 1850s into the post-Civil War era. The headquarters of the gang was a rookery known as "Gotham Court" on Cherry Street in Lower Manhattan, which gave them access to the sewers under Cherry Street. This allowed the gang to easily raid the East River dockyards and sell off its valuable cargo within hours, before the thefts were discovered the following morning. With the Swamp Angels' success, the New York City Police Department began posting snipers to guard the waterfront. However, when these law enforcement measures did not slow down the Swamp Angels' criminal activities, the police were forced to send teams of officers into the sewers, which resulted in regular battles between the police and the gang members. Eventually, regular police patrols of the sewers forced the gang to halt its use of the underground labyrinth, although the gang continued to hijack cargo ships as they were being unloaded onto the wharfs. The Swamp Angels were less visible after 1860, but continued to operate on the waterfront, according to one source, until eventually they merged with the rival waterfront gangs into the White Hand Gang at the end of the 19th century.

== Resources ==
- Asbury, Herbert. The Gangs of New York: An Informal History of the Underworld. Garden City, NY: Garden City Publishing Company, 1927.
- Sifakis, Carl. Encyclopedia of American Crime. New York: Facts on File Inc., 1982.
