= Zoe Pound =

Street gang founded in Miami, Florida, US

- Founded: 1990; 36 years ago
- Founding location: Miami, Florida, U.S.
- Years active: 1990 - present
- Territory: South Florida, Chicago, New York City, Quebec, and the Bahamas
- Ethnicity: Haitian
- Membership (est.): c.1600
- Criminal activities: Drug trafficking, piracy, robbery, murder, prostitution, and racketeering
- Allies: Black Mafia Family, Bloods, and Crips
- Rivals: Sapp Boys, MS-13, and Hells Angels

Zoe Pound is a criminal street gang based in Miami, Florida founded by Haitian immigrants in 1990.

== Etymology ==
"Zoe" is an anglicized variant of the word zo, Haitian Creole for "bone", as members were considered "hard to the bone." "Pound" is said to be an acronym of "Power Of Unified Negroes (in) Divinity", though this is presumably a backronym.

== History ==
Zoe Pound was founded in 1990 in response to growing attacks, primarily from native-born African Americans, on Haitian Americans, initially acting as a vigilante self-defense group. In 1995, several prominent members denounced gang violence and split off, forming a rap group of the same name. Throughout the late 1990s, members engaged in piracy, targeting Haitian trawlers throughout the Miami River. Crewmembers who resisted were reportedly often tortured and/or killed.

In 1999, the Miami-Dade Police Department cracked down on the Boogie Boys and John Does, both then prominent Miami gangs. Zoe Pound took advantage of the power vacuum caused by their sudden decline, expanding across Florida and eventually other states. By 2006, their territory had reached Winchester, Virginia.

In 2009, six Zoe Pound leaders were arrested on racketeering and conspiracy charges in Fort Pierce, Florida after Florida Department of Law Enforcement offices convinced several gang members to give testimony for the prosecution.

Three perpetrators of the 2018 murder of XXXTentacion were members of ZMF, a faction of Zoe Pound.
