= Neighbors' Sons =

The Neighbors' Sons was a New York street gang which, operating in the neighborhoods between Bleecker and Grove Streets, were rivals of the Gopher Gang and the Hudson Dusters during the early 1900s.

During a brawl between members of the Neighbors' Sons and the Hudson Dusters on Staten Island in July 1912, in which three unidentified men approached several men loitering on the corner of Horatio and Washington Streets and began firing in full view of hundreds witnesses, casualties included at least one man, William Jenks, who had been shot in the spine and lungs. Another two men, James Redmond and Edward Ahearn, were later admitted to St. Vincent's Hospital with minor gunshot wounds and were taken into custody for their connection to the shooting.

Known for their frequent altercations with law enforcement, police arrested gang members Thomas McManus, John O'Brien and George Fox, arresting two for assault and attempted robbery as well as a third for interfering in the duties of a police officer after attempting to mug a Ninth Avenue surface car conductor on May 31, 1913. That same morning, police conducted a search for another member who had been stabbed by a rival gang. However, they failed to find him.

They were among many of the gangs who were broken up during the police campaigns against the city's street gangs during 1916.
