= Ozone Park Boys =

Faction of the Gambino crime family

- Founded: 1980s
- Founding location: Ozone Park, Queens, New York City, New York, United States
- Years active: 1980s–present
- Territory: New York City and South Florida
- Ethnicity: Italians as "made men" and other ethnicities as associates
- Activities: Racketeering, auto theft, bookmaking, murder, robbery, arms trafficking, arson, assault, extortion, kidnapping, drug trafficking, intimidation, fraud, identity theft, illegal gambling, and tax evasion
- Allies: Gambino crime family

The Ozone Park Boys, also known as "Liberty Posse" and "The Young Guns", are a Gambino crime family Mafia crew based in Ozone Park, Queens. They are infamous for their massive number of crimes, including an illegal $30 million-a-year sports gambling enterprise.

== Criminal history ==
Since as early as 1986, this crew has been responsible for auto theft and "chop shop" operations, book making, racketeering, murder, robbery, arms trafficking, arson, assault, bank robbery, extortion, kidnapping, drug trafficking, tampering with witnesses, retaliating against witnesses, credit card fraud, identity theft, illegal gambling, interstate travel in aid of racketeering activities, interference with commerce by threats and violence, interstate transportation of stolen property, insurance fraud, mail fraud, tax evasion, wire fraud, and thefts from interstate shipments.

Ronald Trucchio, nicknamed "Ronnie One-Arm" due to a childhood accident that left him unable to use his right arm, ran the crew during the 1990s.

They organized theft of automobile and automobile parts throughout the New York metropolitan area. "The crew members stole specific cars and car parts on order and dismantled the stolen cars in several chop shops in the New York area", the government said, adding that the group also used the shops to facilitate credit card fraud, insurance fraud and robbery conspiracy.

Crew members stole credit cards and account information from the U.S. mail and thereafter purchased consumer goods from merchants in New York and Florida. "The crew participated in violent armed robberies of businesses and individuals during which victims were kidnapped and assaulted", the government alleged.

Members of the criminal crew traveled from New York to South Florida to commit robberies and traffic drugs, as well as perform credit card fraud and illegal weapons sales. In 1999 Damian Ely Bachovacchi was sentenced to five years for interstate drug trafficking, weapons possession and witness tampering. He was released on parole after serving only thirty-four months leading many to believe that Bachovacchi had an "inside man", but such rumors dissipated once it became apparent that the government was still attempting to find evidence on him. Although he was quickly released, the government has tried many attempts to indict him, none being successful. In 2004 the Federal government had a sealed indictment for Bachovacchi which was never handed down due to a "sudden" disappearance of suspects. To this day literally hundreds of files that are linked to The Ozone Park Boys / Young guns remain unsolved. The government also said the crew transported stolen property from Florida to New York and also engaged in numerous armed bank robberies in the New York area.

In 1995, nightclub bouncer Vincent D'Angola and his massage-therapist girlfriend, Jamie Schneider, were found dead in D'Angola's Fort Lauderdale apartment. The next day, the bullet-riddled body of Little League coach Mark Rizzuto was found in Boca Raton. Federal and local authorities have linked the crew to these three unsolved South Florida murders.

"The Trucchio organization" operated two separate wirerooms, first in the basement of an attached, one-family house at 149-29 122nd Street and thereafter in a third-floor apartment at 89-07 North Conduit Avenue, both in Ozone Park.

The crew has been in operation for over two decades.

== Conviction ==
In December 2000, Trucchio and his son, Alphonse, were arrested along with most of the crew for operating a $30 million-a-year sports gambling enterprise in Ozone Park. Trucchio was also charged with failing to file New York State tax returns for the years 1999, 2000 and 2001.

Roccaforte allegedly was the clerk in the gambling operation who answered phones at the wirerooms, recorded wagers called in by bettors and recorded those wagers on tally sheets.

In July 2004, a new indictment was instated against the mobsters, claiming that while behind bars in prison, they made weapons and planned to attack people at a court hearing. They also claimed that the mobsters planned hits on several prosecutors and witnesses against them.

In 2006, Ronald Trucchio was sentenced to life in prison.

In 2017, former Ozone Park Boys leader Gennaro "Jerry" Bruno was sentenced to 21 years in prison for murder.
