= Emil Pinheiro =

Emil Pacheco Pinheiro
- Born: 1923
- Died: July 16, 2001 (aged 77–78); Rio de Janeiro, Brazil
- Occupations: Illegal lottery operator, Soccer club president
- Known for: Involvement in Jogo do Bicho, President of Botafogo soccer club (1991–1992)
- Criminal charge: Involvement in illegal lottery operations
- Criminal penalty: Sentenced to six years in prison (later granted parole)

Emil Pacheco Pinheiro (1923 — Rio de Janeiro, July 16, 2001) was a Brazilian illegal lottery operator in the very popular Jogo do Bicho (the animal game) and the president of Botafogo soccer club (1991–1992).

== Bicheiro ==
A war veteran he acquired his first Jogo do Bicho bank in Barra da Tijuca in 1959 and subsequently became one of the major bicheiros of Rio de Janeiro with Castor de Andrade, Carlinhos Maracanã, Raul Capitão and others. He also controlled the game in Jacarepaguá.

Pinheiro was found guilty by judge Denise Frossard in 1993 of involvement in the Jogo do Bicho, along with 13 other bicho bankers such as Castor de Andrade, Luizinho Drummond, Capitão Guimarães and Anísio Abraão David. They were found responsible for at least 53 deaths. They were sentenced to six years each, the maximum sentence for racketeering. But in December 1996 they were all back on the streets, granted parole or clemency.

== Soccer benefactor ==
In 1988 he became the patron of the Botafogo soccer club, taking over all the debts. The following two years, in 1989 and 1990, Botafogo won the Rio de Janeiro Championship after 21 years without titles, thanks to investments of Pinheiro. He became president of the club in 1991 but left after Botafogo lost the Brazilian Championship from Flamengo in 1992 among rumours of bribes.

Pinheiro died on July 16, 2001. He suffered from Parkinson disease and could not move anymore.
