= Simão Sessim =

Brazilian politician (1935–2021)

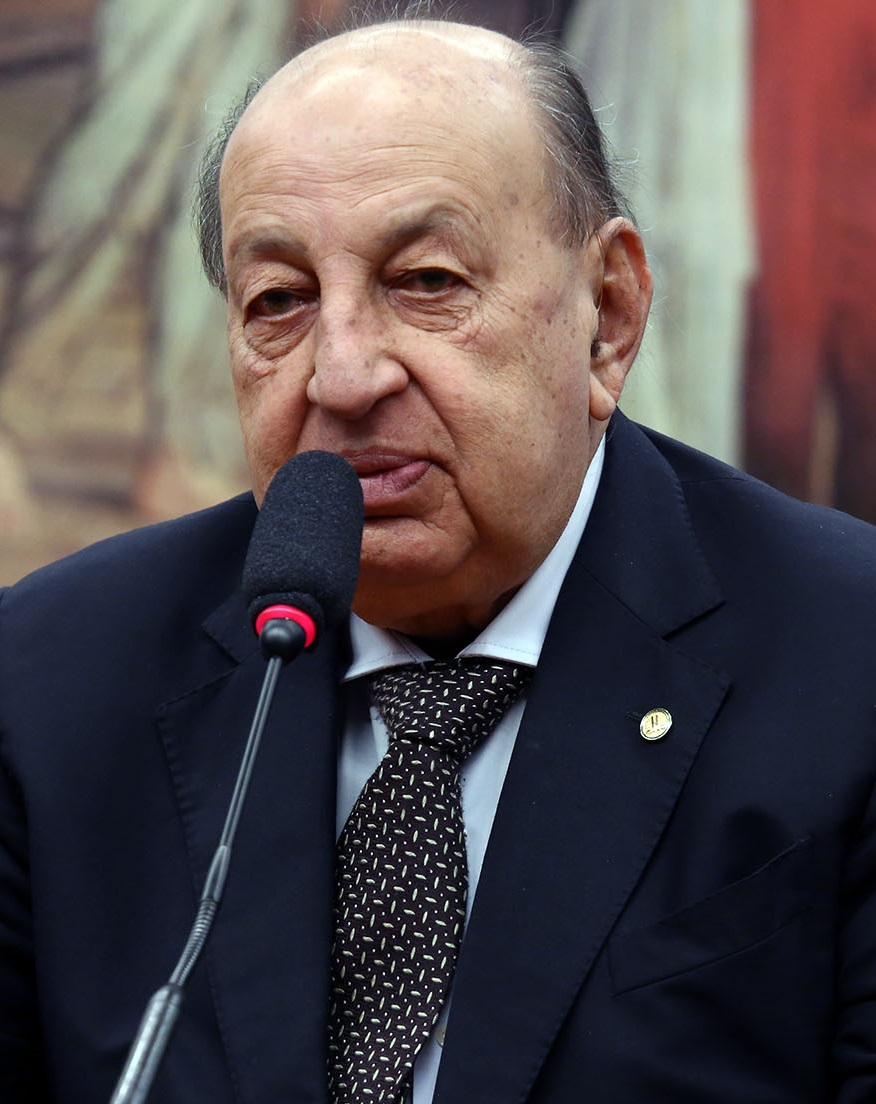
- Simão Sessim in 2017

Member of the Chamber of Deputies
- In office 1 February 1979 – 31 January 2019
- Constituency: Rio de Janeiro

Mayor of Nilópolis
- In office 1 February 1973 – 31 January 1977

Personal details
- Born: Simão Sessim; 8 December 1935 Rio de Janeiro, Federal District, Brazil
- Died: 16 August 2021 (aged 85) Rio de Janeiro, Brazil
- Party: UDN (1962–1969)
- Other political affiliations: ARENA (1969–1979); PDS (1979–1985); PFL (1985-1994); PPR (1994-1995); PSDB (1995-1997); PPB (1997-2003); PP (2003-2019)
- Parents: Sessim David (father); Regina Simão (mother)
- Education: Gama Filho University
- Occupation: Lawyer

Simão Sessim (8 December 1935 – 16 August 2021) was a Brazilian lawyer, teacher and politician who served ten consecutive terms as a federal deputy for Rio de Janeiro for several centre-right political parties and spent 40 years in the Chamber of Deputies. He was a cousin of Farid Abraão David, former mayor of Nilópolis, and Anísio Abraão David, an illegal lottery operator (bicheiro) and the patron of the Beija-Flor samba school in Nilópolis, that has won 14 parades of the Carnaval do Rio de Janeiro.

== Early life ==
At the beginning of the 20th century, many Syrian-Lebanese immigrants settled in Nilópolis, among them the patriarchs of the Sessim and Abraão David families, who established themselves as local merchants in the 1920s. In the 1960s, the family began a career in politics. In 1962, his brother doctor Jorge Sessim David was elected to the Legislative Assembly of Rio de Janeiro by the UDN. In 1972, Simão Sessim, himself was elected mayor of Nilópolis by ARENA. He is the son of Sessim David and Regina Simão. The relation between these two families, Abraão David and Sessim, is intertwined with the history of Nilópolis itself. The different branches of the family as a whole have lost the mayoral elections only a few times. The public machine is built on the control exercised by the family and its interests.

A lawyer who graduated from Gama Filho University in 1969, Simão Sessim became director of the Rangel Pestana Education Institute in Nova Iguaçu in 1964, where he remained until he was appointed Municipal Secretary of Education in 1969 and head of the mayor's office. He was the attorney-general of Nilópolis and advised the presidency of the Foundation for the Development of the Metropolitan Region of Rio de Janeiro (FUNDREN) in the Faria Lima government (1974–1979).

== Political career ==
During his political career he was a member of an alphabet soup of right or centre-right political parties, often the result of internal splits and re-alliances, known in Brazil as the Centrão, an alliance of parties without a specific or consistent ideological orientation that aims to ensure proximity to the executive branch in order to guarantee advantages and allow them to distribute privileges through clientelistic networks.

A member of the UDN before the 1964 Military dictatorship in Brazil, he was elected mayor of Nilópolis in 1972 by ARENA and was elected federal deputy for Rio de Janeiro in 1978, re-elected by the PDS in 1982. He joined the PFL in 1985, renewing his mandate in 1986 and 1990. He was a member of the Brazilian Constituent Assembly that drafted the 1988 Constitution. In 1992, he voted for the impeachment of President Fernando Collor, joining the PPR and PSDB, for which he lost the Nilópolis mayoralty in 1996. Affiliated to the PPB, he was re-elected in 1998 and 2002, winning further mandates with the PP in 2006 and 2010. On 17 April 2016, he voted in favour of the impeachment of President Dilma Rousseff.

During the Michel Temer presidency, he voted in favour of the Constitutional Amendment of the Public Expenditure Cap, limiting the growth of the Brazilian government's expenses for 20 years. In April 2017, he was in favour of the 2017 reform of labour laws. In August 2017, he voted in favour of President Michel Temer, in the process in which an investigation was being requested, which could have removed him from the presidency of the republic.

Simão was not re-elected in 2018, and on 16 August 2021 he died at the age of 85, battling cancer, but succumbing of the complications from as a result of COVID-19 in the Hospital Pró-Cardíaco in Botafogo, Rio de Janeiro. The municipality of Nilópolis decreed three days of official mourning in the city. His son Sérgio Sessim followed his father's footsteps and was elected mayor of Nilópolis in 2008, serving until 2012.

== Alleged involvement in corruption ==
In April 1994, Sessim's name was discovered on a list of people who allegedly received money from operators of the illicit lottery, known as Jogo do Bicho, in Rio de Janeiro. Seized by the Public Prosecutor's Office from the office of the bicheiro Castor de Andrade in Bangu, the list included several politicians, members of the judiciary, renowned lawyers and police delegates. His cousin Anísio Abraão David was one of the top bicheiros convicted to six years of prison for criminal association in May 1993 by judge Denise Frossard.

Simão was investigated by the Supreme Federal Court (STF) for being accused by whistleblowers of receiving bribes in the scandal known as Operation Car Wash, which embezzled funds from the state-owned oil company Petrobras. He allegedly received R$200,000 in a meeting at Petrobras and "was one of the few who thanked us," said a former director of the company Paulo Roberto Costa. The investigation was closed by STF Justice Teori Zavascki on 16 June 2016, following a request to close the case by the Prosecutor General Rodrigo Janot, due to the lack of sufficient elements to launch a criminal indictment. According to Janot, although the plea bargains presented credible elements, the investigative effort "was unsuccessful in gathering other sources that could corroborate them."

== Sources ==
- Bezerra, Luiz Anselmo (2010). A família Beija-Flor (PDF) (Thesis) (in Portuguese). Niteroi RJ: Universidade Federal Fluminense, Instituto de Ciências Humanas e Filosofia, Departemento de História. Archived from the original (PDF) on 9 April 2023.
- Jupiara, Aloy; Otavio, Chico (2015). Os porões da contravenção. Jogo do bicho e ditadura militar: a história da aliança que profissionalizou o crime organizado (in Portuguese). Rio de Janeiro: Record. ISBN 978-85-01-10644-5.
- Mainwaring, Scott P. (1999). Rethinking party systems in the third wave of democratization: the case of Brazil. Stanford, Calif.: Stanford University Press. ISBN 978-0-804-73057-0.
- Motta, Aydano André (2012). Maravilhosa e Soberana: Histórias da Beija-Flor (in Portuguese). Rio de Janeiro: Verso Brasil Editora. ISBN 978-85-62767-03-6.
