= Antônio Petrus Kalil =

Operators of an illegal lottery (1925–2019)

Antônio Petrus Kalil (March 18, 1925 – January 28, 2019), known as Turcão ("Big Turk"), was one of the operators of the jogo do bicho ("the animal game"), a popular illegal lottery in Brazil. Kalil ran the game in a number of towns, including Niterói, and was one of 14 bicheiros or banqueiros—"bankers" as the game's operators are known—who were sentenced to six years' imprisonment in May 1993 for operating a criminal association. Kalil's brother Jose, known as "Zinho", was among those convicted. Denise Frossard, the judge in the case, wrote in 2007 that it was the first time the existence of a mafia-type organization had been recognized in Brazil. According to Frossard, Kalil was one of the organization's bosses in 1981. In April 2007, he was among 24 people charged for involvement with the illegal lottery, as well as bingo parlours and the distribution of slot machines. On March 13, 2012, he was sentenced to 48 years in prison and a fine of BRL 11 million (about US$6 million) for conspiracy and corruption, together with the other bicho bosses Anísio Abraão David and Capitão Guimarães.

== Illegal lottery ==
Kalil's illegal lottery business is based in Niterói in the State of Rio de Janeiro. His brother, José Petrus Kalil or "Zinho", controlled the Jogo do Bicho in the city center of Rio de Janeiro, and acted as the spokesperson of the bicheiros.

According to judge Frossard and public prosecutor Antônio Carlos Biscaia, the bicheiros built an association (known as the cupola do bicho), that controlled the illegal gambling business and shielded it from prosecution by corrupting authorities and police. Kalil was one of the founders of the cupola and served as its head for a while. The cupola established itself when a power conflict between the bicheiros ceased at the beginning of the 1980s after the murder of an ex-policeman linked to the association that tried to intrude in the gambling racket in Niteroi controlled by Turcao and another prominent illegal gambling operator, Ailton Guimaraes Jorge, nicknamed Capitao Guimaraes. (The murder remained unsolved)

Over the years, Kalil expanded his business to northern Minas Gerais, and the city of Salvador de Bahia, as well as outside Brazil, to Paraguay, where he owned a casino. His reach also extended to the state of Pernambuco in the North-East of Brazil, which raised protest among local gambling operators. According to a local gambling operator, Kalil was making BRL 500,000 (approximately US$300,000) per month in 2002 in Pernambuco. He was guaranteeing high stakes games for small gambling operators in the state.

== 1993 arrest and conviction ==
Turcão and his brother "Zinho" were among the 14 bicheiros of Rio de Janeiro who were arrested in 1993. In May 1993, Judge Denise Frossard convicted the 14 bicheiros to six years of prison for criminal association and racketeering. The trial confirmed that a mafia-type criminal organization existed which was headed by the cupola.

While imprisoned, they continued their business via cell phones supplied to them by corrupted police officers. During the trial there were indications of money laundering and tax evasion, but the defendants could not be charged because money laundering only became a crime in Brazil in 1998. According to the newspaper O Globo, 53 deaths could be attributed to the association. By December 1996 they were all released from prison, granted parole or pardons.

Fellow animal game operator Castor de Andrade is generally considered to have been the head of the cupola. According to former crime reporter and political scientist, José Amaral Argolo, Castor used Kalil as a shield: as the biggest guarantor banker of the illegal lottery of Rio de Janeiro, Kalil was discreet, respected among his peers and known for the harsh but efficient actions under his command. After the death of Castor de Andrade in April 1997, Kalil and Capitão Guimarães became the most important bicheiros in Rio.

== Operation Hurricane ==
On April 12, 2007, Turcão and the other bicheiros Anísio Abraão David and Capitão Guimarães were among 24 people arrested during Operation Hurricane for their alleged involvement with the illegal numbers games, bingo parlours and the distribution of slot machines, known in Brazil as "nickel hunters" (caça-níqueis). The detainees were suspected of involvement in the exploitation of illegal gambling, corruption of public officials, influence peddling and receiving. Raids by the Federal Police uncovered big payoffs to judges, police officers, prosecutors and lawyers by the bosses who run the game. Piles of documents were seized and BRL 6 million in cash confiscated. Turcão, Anísio and Capitão Guimarães were considered to have formed the new cúpula of the bicheiros. Documents found by the Federal Police while serving the search warrants showed that the gambling mafia paid BRL 1 million to police officials every month, as well as BRL 23,000 to politicians. While in custody, he bribed his escort of Federal Police officers who were escorting him, to give him privileged treatment, including stops at restaurants and secret meetings with relatives, friends and even his mistress.

Turcão was released in August 2007 and placed under home arrest. He was arrested again on November 29, 2007, for his involvement with illicit slot machines. His son Marcelo Kalil Petrus is also involved in the illegal gambling rackets. Authorities claim that he is the bookkeeper of the slot machine mafia, and he was arrested in August 2007. According to a last will and testament seized by the Polícia Federal, the then 82-year old Turcão who was suffering from a heart disease, passed on his interest in gambling to his son Marcelo Kalil Petrus. His other son Antônio Petrus Kalil Filho is also accused of being involved in the illegal gambling rackets. According to Turcão's last will and testament, he received the so-called pontos de jogo do bicho (animal game gambling sites), in Niterói, São Gonçalo and parts of the Zona Norte (North Zone) of Rio.

On March 13, 2012, Turcão was sentenced to 48 years in prison and a fine of BRL 11 million (about USD 6 million) for conspiracy and corruption, together with the other bicho bosses Anísio Abraão David and Capitão Guimarães. Due to his advanced age and ill health he was permitted to serve his sentence at home. He was suffering from hypertension and Alzheimer's disease, causing slow progressive dementia. His son Marcelo Kalil Petrus received a sentence of 2 years and 10 months for formation of a gang. The sentence was annulled by the Supreme Federal Court, but in December 2012 Kalil, Anísio and Capitão Guimarães and 21 others were again convicted by the Criminal Court in Rio de Janeiro. Kalil was sentenced to 47 years and 9 months for conspiracy and corruption. The judge's sentence said that the bicheiros' criminal organisation had "an intense connection with the state, through the bribing of public officials, including in the police and the judiciary, and even with the political system, through the financing of political campaigns."

In October 2016, the case was due to be judged in second instance by the Federal Court in Rio. However, three weeks earlier, the trial was postponed because of an injunction granted by Justice Marco Aurélio Mello of the Federal Supreme Court. In April 2018, the Supreme Court revoked the provisional decision that suspended the trial, which was scheduled for February 2019. With the death of Turcão on January 28, 2019, the case against him was extinguished.

== Philanthropist ==
Kalil was the patron of the Académicos do Cubango samba school in Niteroi that participates in the famous Rio Carnival. The family is also a benefactor of charities, through the Associação Filantropica-Esportiva Tereza e Antonio Kalil (AFETAK). Turcão's wife Tereza became famous for her contribution of US$40,000 to the anti-hunger campaign organized by the political activist and sociologist Herbert de Souza, better known as Betinho.

Kalil died on January 28, 2019, at the age of 93, after he had been hospitalized in Niterói, in the Metropolitan Region of Rio de Janeiro, with pneumonia.
