= Luizinho Drummond =

Brazilian illegal lottery operator (1940–2020)

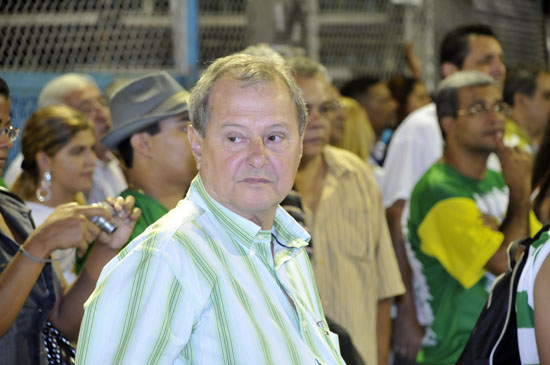
- Luiz Pacheco Drummond in 2008 at the Sambódromo 2008. (Photo: Ricardo Almeida)
- Born: 14 February 1940; Rio de Janeiro city, Brazil
- Died: 1 July 2020 (aged 80); Rio de Janeiro city, Brazil
- Occupation: Bicheiro

Luiz Pacheco Drummond (14 February 1940 — 1 July 2020), nicknamed Luizinho Drummond, was an illegal lottery operator (bicheiro) and the patron of samba school Imperatriz Leopoldinense. He was the president of the Independent League of Samba Schools of Rio de Janeiro (LIESA) from 1998 to 2001. He was born and died in Rio de Janeiro.

== Bicheiro ==
Drummond controlled the illegal but popular private lottery system known as the Jogo do Bicho, or "animal game", in the Leopoldina area of Rio de Janeiro. The operators are known as contraventores (those that flout the law), bicheiros or banqueiros ("bankers").

Drummond was found guilty by judge Denise Frossard in 1993 of involvement in the Jogo do Bicho, along with 13 other bicho bankers such as Castor de Andrade, Capitão Guimarães and Anísio Abraão David. They were found responsible for at least 53 deaths. They were sentenced to six years each, the maximum sentence for racketeering. But in December 1996, they were all back on the streets, granted parole or clemency.

In 2002, he became the vice-president of Botafogo soccer club. Luizinho Drummond was president of Imperatriz Leopoldinense since 2007. Before, he had already held the position twice (1976-1983 and 1986-1992).

== Charged with murder ==
In 1999, Drummond was charged with the murder of the gambling racketeer, Abílio Português in 1998, but the timing of his arrest appeared aimed at sending a message to mob leaders involved in the Rio Carnival. Police said Drummond and his alleged victim had clashed in a territorial dispute over the control of the Jogo do Bicho.

== Death ==
Drummond died on 1 July 2020, in the Hospital Copa Star in Rio de Janeiro after suffering a stroke the day before.

== Family and relatives ==
=== Arrest of his son ===
On 13 March 2006 the Federal Police arrested Luizinho’s son Luiz Antônio Drummond in Belém, in the state Pará in the north of Brazil, in an operation against illegal gambling with slot machines, known in Brazil as "nickel hunters" (caça-níqueis). The arrest indicated the national expansion of the Rio Bicheiros.
