= Farid Abraão David =

Brazilian politician (1944–2020)

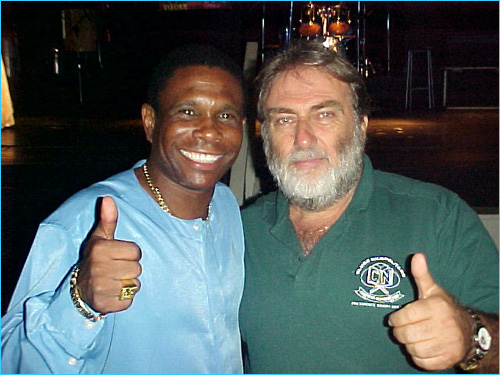
- Neguinho da Beija-Flor and Farid Abraão David

Mayor of Nilópolis
- In office January 1, 2017 – November 11, 2020
- Preceded by: Alessandro Calazans
- Succeeded by: Jane Louise David

Mayor of Nilópolis
- In office January 1, 2001 – January 1, 2009
- Preceded by: José Carlos Soares Cunha
- Succeeded by: Sérgio Sessim

Personal details
- Born: April 3, 1944 Nilópolis, Rio de Janeiro, Brazil
- Died: December 11, 2020 (aged 76) Rio de Janeiro, Brazil
- Party: PDS; PFL; PP; PTB
- Profession: Politician and lawyer

Farid Abrão David (April 3, 1944 – December 11, 2020) was a Brazilian politician of Lebanese descent, active in the municipality where he was born, Nilópolis, and more recently, in the neighboring city, Mesquita.

He was also known for being a Carnival leader at the Beija-Flor samba school. He was the brother of the patron of Beija-Flor de Nilópolis Anísio Abraão David, cousin of Simão Sessim and uncle of Abraãozinho David, former and current mayor of Nilópolis. His son Ricardo Abrão was a state deputy.

== Biography ==
Farid was mayor of Nilópolis, elected in October 2016 with 60.10% of the votes (60,595 votes), he was a state deputy several times, by the PDS, PFL and PP. Between 2001 and 2008 he was Mayor of Nilópolis.

He was president of Beija-Flor de Nilópolis for 18 years, obtaining several titles for the association making it known worldwide. He changed his electoral domicile in 2012, and ran for mayor of Mesquita, taking second place with 24.98% of the votes (24,466 votes). In 2013, he returned to the presidency of Beija-Flor, after the resignation of predecessor Nelsinho Abraão. In 2014, he was elected State Deputy by the PTB with 38,342 votes, being the most voted candidate in Nilópolis. In the 2016 Municipal Elections he was again elected mayor of Nilópolis by the PTB with 60.10% valid votes, his third term after 8 years away from the city hall, and his nephew Sérgio Sessim was mayor between 2009 and 2013. His term officially began on January 1, 2017.

== Personal life ==
Farid Abraão David was married to Jane Louise David for 51 years. They have together three children (Ricardo, Flávia and Adriana) and seven grandchildren. He was Roman Catholic and lawyer.

== Death ==
He died from COVID-19 in Rio de Janeiro, on 11 December 2020, at the age of 76. Farid was admitted to Copa D'Or Hospital on 30 November with the virus. With his death while still in office as mayor, he was succeeded by his wife, until the inauguration of the mayor elected for the next term, his nephew, Abraãozinho David.

A Seventh Day Mass was celebrated in his honour on December 17, 2020.
