= Castor de Andrade =

Brazilian lottery operator (1926–1997)

- Castor de Andrade
- Born: 12 February 1926; Rio de Janeiro city, Brazil
- Died: 11 April 1997 (aged 71); Rio de Janeiro city, Brazil
- Spouses: Wilma Andrade; Ana Cristina Bastos Moreira
- Children: 4
- Parent: Eusébio de Andrade e Silva

Castor Gonçalves de Andrade e Silva (12 February 1926 – 11 April 1997) was a Brazilian illegal lottery operator in the very popular Jogo do Bicho (the animal game) in Rio de Janeiro. From the 1980s, Castor de Andrade was the uncontested leader of all the main bicheiros (Note: A "bicheiro" or "banker" is the mobster who operates the jogo do bicho ("the animal's game"), a popular Brazilian illegal gambling game.) and contraventores (Note: In Brazilian law, contraventor is someone who commits a contravenção (criminal misdemeanor).) of the city of Rio de Janeiro, and had more than 100 policemen and a number of public servants, prominent politicians, and judges working for him. Castor was also very involved in the Brazilian Carnival and in football—he was the major sponsor of Bangu Atlético Clube and even called the "owner of Bangu", and he was also the patron of samba school Mocidade Independente de Padre Miguel. He also helped found in 1984 the Liga Independente das Escolas de Samba do Rio de Janeiro, which has run the Rio de Janeiro Carnival ever since and has served as the legal cover for the "jogo do bicho cartel".

In 1993, Castor de Andrade and 13 other major bicheiros were arrested. They were each sentenced to six years of prison, but Castor obtained a habeas corpus and was released in the same year. In March 1994, a subsequent operation managed to break Castor's stronghold. Documents revealed the names of the many policemen, politicians, judges, public servants, and other prominent people who were profiting from his illegal activities. After his death in April 1997, the heirs to his fortune began fighting each other over the inheritance, and this led to the murder of his son, Paulo de Andrade, in October 1998.

== Illicit gambling empire ==
Castor was born in 1926 to a family who was very involved in the jogo do bicho. His grandmother Iaiá was already known as a jogo do bicho lottery operator. His father, Eusébio de Andrade e Silva, invested in cattle raising and founded a transport company. Castor had a carefree infancy. He studied in the traditional school Colégio Pedro II, but frequently skipped classes to go to the beaches of the neighborhood of Flamengo. This, however, did not prevent him from graduating in law.

Castor inherited the jogo do bicho office of his grandmother and father and with his uncles transformed it to an illicit gambling empire – taking over more and more pontos (points-of-sale) where the lottery dealers collect money and keep record of the bets. He would eventually expand to slot machines and video poker as well. He rose to power despite his reputation. After the 1964 Brazilian coup d'état, various generals paid homage to him. The military regime was unable to crack down on the illegal lottery. The Secretary of Security of Rio de Janeiro of that time, General Waldir Alves Muniz, received an instruction to "avoid problems with Castor de Andrade". Ex-president João Figueiredo one day broke the protocol, departing from a group of authorities who surrounded him to personally greet the bicheiro.

Castor de Andrade and his son Paulo Roberto de Andrade operated the illegal lottery in Marechal Hermes, Padre Miguel, Bangu, Santíssimo, Senador Camará, Mangaratiba and Ibicuí. He was considered a romantic bicheiro, who did not allow other unnecessary businesses, such as drug trafficking, to be explored together with the illicit lottery. He managed a metal-working business that over the years had produced war material for the Brazilian armed forces, and he owned gasoline stations and a used car agency.

== Football and Carnival ==
Castor de Andrade was the major sponsor of Bangu Atlético Clube and was even called the "owner of Bangu". Although he never served as president of the club, he often held high positions and the president always obeyed him and never made a decision without seeking advice from him first. Under his leadership the club won the Campeonato Carioca in 1966. The players referred to him as their "father" and every week he used to hand out money to them. He was accused several times of intimidating referees into giving his team assistance. Once, in a game against América, in the Maracanã stadium, he invaded the field with a revolver. He demanded an explanation from the referee regarding his decision to grant a penalty in favour of América. Bangu was ahead 2 to 1 and América tied. The referee later granted another penalty, this time in favour of Bangu. Castor's team won 3 to 2.

Since the 1970s, most of the big samba schools had a "patron" related to the jogo do bicho. Castor de Andrade was the patron of the Mocidade Independente de Padre Miguel samba school. Under his leadership Mocidade won the Rio Carnival title in 1979, 1985, 1990, 1991, and 1996. His participation in the Carnival was not limited to his samba school. For decades he invested money in the organization of parades. Dissatisfied with where the official league, the Associação das Escolas de Samba da Cidade do Rio de Janeiro (AESCRJ), was heading for and feeling a need to negotiate more openly with the government about financial transfers to the Carnival, Castor helped found the Liga Independente das Escolas de Samba do Rio de Janeiro (LIESA - Samba Schools' Independente League of Rio de Janeiro) in Rio de Janeiro in 1984. He served as LIESA's first president. Because of the new league, the samba schools started receiving more financial assistance and the standard of the parades could be maintained. LIESA served as the legal cover for the "jogo do bicho cartel".

== Trials ==
Taking advantage of the attention of the media and public opinion during the Carnival of 1993, Castor gave a 5-minute speech angrily condemning the persecution of bicheiros in a full Sambadrome. Three months later, in May 1993, judge Denise Frossard convicted Castor and 13 other major bicheiros (among them Capitão Guimarães, Luizinho Drummond, Antonio Petrus Kalil, alias Turcão, and Anísio Abraão David) to six years of prison for criminal association. Formally, 53 deaths were attributed to the group.". However, in the same year Castro obtained a habeas corpus and was released and by December 1996 the rest of the bicheiros were all back on the streets, granted parole or clemency.

On March 30, 1994, Castor suffered a new mishap. Prosecutor Biscaia launched a new action against the jogo do bicho in Rio de Janeiro, bursting the stronghold of Castor in Bangu and seizing 17 cash books, 140 account books, and 166 computer disks. He is cited as having said, right after his bunker was busted, "What police is this?". Castor de Andrade was one of the first bicheiros that started bribing policemen, and policemen from all police forces received money from him. A special screened unit of the BOPE (Special Police Operations Battalion), the special forces of the Military Police of Rio de Janeiro State, was used during the operation against Castor.

The police investigations revealed that big names had been profiting from the illegal activities of bicho's Mafia. Among them, former president Fernando Collor de Mello, Rio governor Nilo Batista, São Paulo mayor Paulo Maluf, Rio mayor Cesar Maia, seven entrepreneurs, three judges, 12 congressmen and seven assemblymen, 25 police commissioners and 100 police officers. According to prosecutor Antônio Carlos Biscaia, "the Public Ministry of Rio de Janeiro investigated their involvement in more than 130 homicides and verified the corruption scheme centralized and led by Castor de Andrade ..., who recorded the bribes for military and civil policemen, public servants, including those of the Public Ministry and Judiciary, and even well-known politicians who received financial help for their compromised political campaigns."

There were also suspicions that Castor and his people had a partnership with Colombian Cali Cartel. Preliminary findings showed Rio bicheiros responsible for transporting cocaine in Brazil and shipping it overseas. In Porto Seguro, Castor had set up a fishing company that was used for cocaine trafficking. He allegedly helped the Sicilian Mafioso Antonio Salamone to settle in Brazil. Castor gave him a cover job at Bangu Textiles, which he owned. Salamone became a naturalized Brazilian because of de Andrade's influence.

== Arrest and incarceration ==
After his conviction, Castor disappeared. Seven months later, he was found while visiting the Auto Show at the Anhembi Convention Center in São Paulo on October 26, 1994. He was disguised with a fake goatee and his hair and moustache were painted in black. Rogério de Andrade and Ana Paula de Andrade e Silva, his two nephews, were accompanying him. He later admitted to the police that he loved cars since he was a child and could not resist the temptation to visit the Auto Show.

He was sent to Polinter prison, along with fellow bicheiros Capitão Guimarães, José Petrus, alias Zinho, and Fernando Iggnácio, Castor's son-in-law. Following charges that their cells were filled with luxuries, authorities decided to inspect their cells. The inspectors concluded that the jail looked like "a five-star hotel". The cells were equipped with a mini-bar, a TV, a video player, a sound system with a CD player, cellphones, an air-conditioner, a microwave oven, and a freezer. There were "strong evidences that the bicheiros made renovations and improvements in the internal part of the jail, such as the installation of new floor coverings, azulejo-tiles and sanitary ware."

Because of heart problems, he was put on house arrest to spend his conviction in his luxurious apartment in the Avenida Atlântica, the coastal road running alongside the beach of Copacabana. But he went out to the streets frequently, without being bothered.

== Death and legacy ==
On April 11, 1997, disrespecting as usual his house arrest, Castor was playing cards in the house of a friend, in Leblon, alongside Ipanema the most upmarket district in Rio, when he suffered a deadly heart attack. His body was laid out in the samba school he was associated with, the Mocidade Independente de Padre Miguel. During the Carnival of 1998, the samba school Caprichosos de Pilares started their parade with a minute of silence to honor him.

Shortly before he died, Castor divided his estate in two parts: his son Paulo "Paulinho" Roberto de Andrade, inherited the jogo do bicho interests, while his son-in-law Fernando de Miranda Iggnácio received the slot machines and video poker. A vicious struggle over the inheritance developed in the family. Paulinho Andrade was murdered in October 1998, on the orders of Castor's nephew Rogério Costa de Andrade. Subsequently, Rogério and Fernando Iggnácio became involved in a war about the illicit gambling interests.

The violent dispute over the proceeds of Castor's illicit heritage appears to have ended when Iggnácio was executed on 10 November 2020 in Recreio dos Bandeirantes, in the West Zone of Rio de Janeiro. In March 2021, the Public Prosecutor's Office of Rio de Janeiro denounced Rogério Andrade as the mastermind behind the murder of Iggnácio.

On February 11, 2021, a docuseries following Castor de Andrade's life titled Doutor Castor was released by Globoplay.

== Sources ==
- Frossard, Denise (2007). "Women in Organized Crime in Brazil". In Fiandaca, Giovanni (ed.). Women and the Mafia: Female Roles in Organized Crime Structures. New York: Springer. pp. 181–204. ISBN 0-387-36537-0.
