= Anísio Abraão David =

Brazilian bicheiro

Anísio
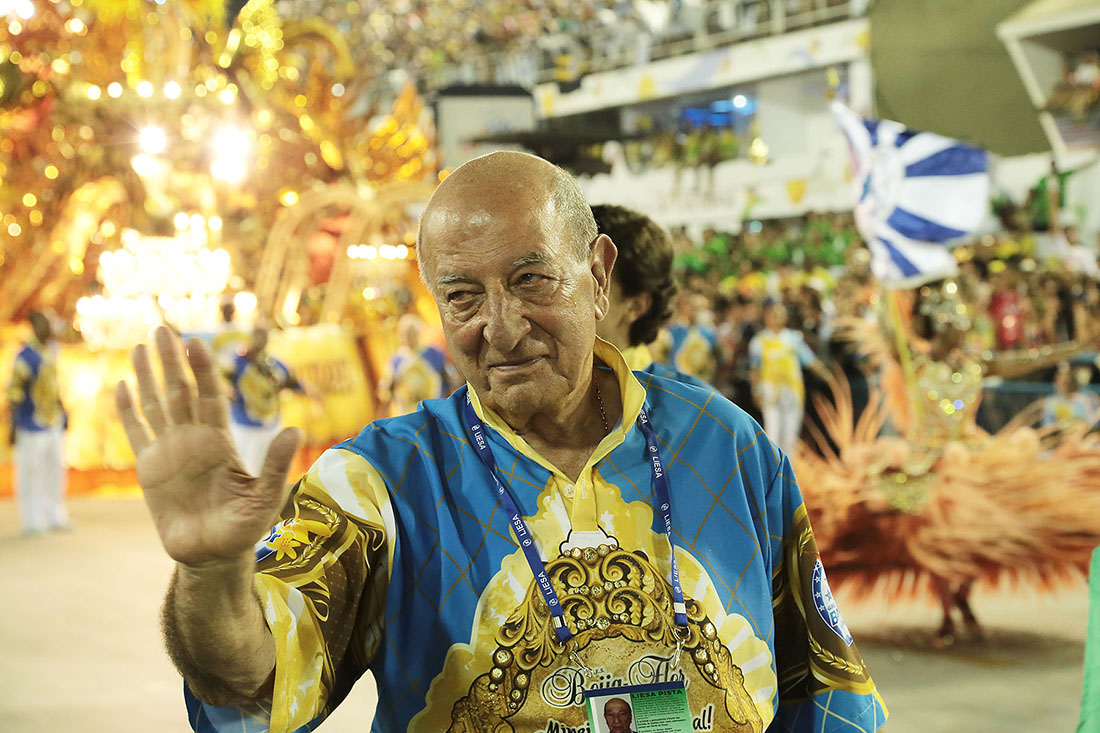
- Aniz Abraão David in 2016
- Born: 7 June 1937 (age 89); Rio de Janeiro city, Brazil
- Occupation: Bicheiro

Aniz Abraão David (Rio de Janeiro, 7 June 1937), better known as Anísio, is an operator in the illegal jogo do bicho lottery (popularly known as bicheiro) and the honorary president of the Beija-Flor samba school in Nilópolis. He has been the president of the Independent League of Samba Schools of Rio de Janeiro (LIESA) from 1985-1987.

From a humble start at the beginning of the 1960s, Anísio and his family became the masters of municipal political power, the controllers of bicho gambling in the Baixada Fluminense and the champions of Rio's carnival. Their support for the military dictatorship and their collaboration in the persecution and prosecution of opponents of the regime, in combination with co-opting of military and police officers to protect their business, helped to advance their rise. The purging of the small bicheiros, with the annexation of their selling points through intimidation and force, and the "takeover" of the Beija Flor samba school, opened up space for their social ascension and the strengthening of their power in Nilópolis.

== Early life ==
At the beginning of the 20th century, many Syrian-Lebanese immigrants settled in Nilópolis, among them the patriarchs of the Sessim and Abraão David families, who established themselves as local merchants in the 1920s. In the 1960s, the family began a career in politics. In 1962, doctor Jorge Sessim David was elected to the state legislature by the UDN. The relation between these two families, Abraão David and Sessim, is intertwined with the history of Nilópolis itself. An enthusiast of the military regime, Simão Sessim, Anísio's cousin, became mayor of Nilópolis in 1972 running for ARENA, and since then the family has lost the mayoral elections only a few times. The public machine is built on the control exercised by the family and its interests.

Anísio was born Nilópolis as the seventh child in a family with ten children. His parents had migrated from Akkar in Lebanon to Brazil. Anísio was a hawker on the trains from Central train station in the city of Rio to the Baixada Fluminense and a rent collector in Nilópolis, until he discovered, at a young age, that de jogo do bicho had no clear leader in the city. With one of his younger brothers, Nelson Abraão David, as his right-hand man, he took over in the 1960s controlling the betting stalls in Nilópolis.

The rise of the Abraão-Sessim family in Nilópolis coincided with the rise of Beija-Flor. In the mid-1970s, the samba school came under the control of the Abraão David clan and received financial support from the family. At the same time, Beija-Flor established itself among the elite of Rio's carnival, with expensive and luxurious parades, while the families aligned themselves with the military regime. The link between the public authorities and the samba school was maintained over the years with the election of members of the Abraão-Sessim family, who ran both the city and the samba school.

== Bicheiro ==
Anísio gained control over the illegal bicho game in Nilópolis and the Baixada Fluminense. Journalistic sources point to Anísio as the main leader of the organisation, which during the 1960s and 1970s expanded through a wide network in the Baixada Fluminense region, based on political guarantees obtained through the influence of then state deputy Jorge Sessim David, a member of the family's collateral branch, and the main person responsible for Abraão David and Sessim joining the military regime shortly after the 1964 military coup.

In 1993, in a landmark court case that recognized the existence of a mafia-type organization involved in the illegal lottery in Brazil for the first time, he was found guilty by judge Denise Frossard of involvement in the game, along with 13 other bicho bankers such as Castor de Andrade and Capitão Guimarães. They were held responsible for at least 53 deaths, and were sentenced to six years each, the maximum sentence for racketeering. But in December 1996 they were all back on the streets, granted parole or clemency. In Anísio's extensive criminal record, six arrests are recorded throughout his life involving contraventions in relation to controlling the jogo do bicho, one of the most famous being Operation Hurricane, which landed bicheiros and members of the judiciary in jail in 2007.

The family continued to wield significant political power in Nilópolis. His brother Farid Abraão David, the president of Beija-Flor for 18 years until his death in 2020, was the mayor of the city from 2001 to 2008 and again from 2017 to 2020. One of his nephews, Ricardo Abraão, the son of Farid, was a state deputy twice, while Simão Sessim was elected to the federal Chamber of Deputies for ten consecutive mandates from 1979 to 2019.

== Fixing the 2007 Carnival ==
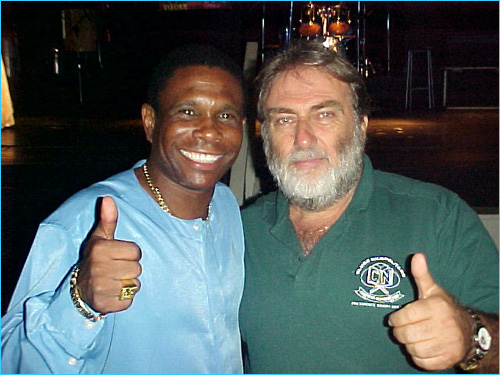
Samba singer Neguinho da Beija-Flor and Farid Abraão David in 2007

Anísio and other bicheiros Antonio Petrus Kalil, or Turcão, and Capitão Guimarães were among 25 people arrested on April 12, 2007, during Operation Hurricane, for alleged involvement with illegal numbers games, bingo parlors and the distribution of slot machines. Raids by the Federal Police have uncovered big payoffs to judges, police officers, prosecutors and lawyers from the bosses who run the game. Mounds of documents have been seized and US$6 million in cash has been confiscated.

One of the charges was that bicheiros fixed the results of Rio de Janeiro's 2007 carnival parade. Press reports suggest that Anísio, the president of Beija-Flor that won the competition, used bribes and a hitman to buy and intimidate members of the carnival jury. According to a Federal Police report some of the judges may have been bribed or pressured into favouring Beija-Flor. A gunman working for Beija-Flor's president of honour, Anísio, allegedly threatened some of the judges. According to extracts from a federal police report "some individuals who worked as carnival jurors and refused to accept benefits from Anisio were threatened or had their relatives threatened with death if the Beija-Flor school did not win the 2007 carnival".

== New arrest and conviction ==
He was released while appealing for a habeas corpus, but arrested again on January 11, 2012, for driving while accompanied by an armed security gang. Police were also investigating him for money-laundering. His detention followed a previous failed attempt in which a police helicopter swooped on his penthouse in Copacabana while he was out.

On 12 March 2012, he was sentenced to 48 years in prison and a fine of BRL 11 million (about USD 6 million) for formation of armed gangs, money laundering, smuggling and corruption, together with other bicho bosses Capitão Guimarães and Antônio Petrus Kalil. Anísio was again arrested. The sentence was annulled by the Supreme Federal Court, but in December 2012 Anísio, Capitão Guimarães, Kalil and 19 others were again convicted by the Criminal Court in Rio de Janeiro. Anísio was sentenced to 47 years and 9 months for conspiracy and corruption. The judge's sentence said that the bicheiros' criminal organisation had "an intense connection with the state, through the bribing of public officials, including in the police and the judiciary, and even with the political system, through the financing of political campaigns."

== Sources ==
- Bezerra, Luiz Anselmo (2010). A família Beija-Flor (PDF) (Thesis) (in Portuguese). Niteroi RJ: Universidade Federal Fluminense, Instituto de Ciências Humanas e Filosofia, Departemento de História. Archived from the original (PDF) on 2023-04-09.
- Frossard, Denise (2007), "Women in Organized Crime in Brazil", in Fiandaca, Giovanni (ed.), Women and the Mafia, New York: Springer, pp. 181–204, ISBN 978-0-387-36537-4
- Jupiara, Aloy; Otavio, Chico (2015). Os porões da contravenção. Jogo do bicho e ditadura militar: a história da aliança que profissionalizou o crime organizado (in Portuguese). Rio de Janeiro: Record. ISBN 978-85-01-10644-5.
- Motta, Aydano André (2012). Maravilhosa e Soberana: Histórias da Beija-Flor (in Portuguese). Rio de Janeiro: Verso Brasil Editora. ISBN 978-85-62767-03-6.
