= Capitão Guimarães =

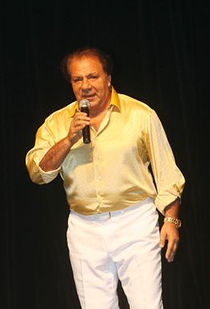
- Ailton Guimarães Jorge
- Born: Ailton Guimarães Jorge; 24 November 1941; Rio de Janeiro city, Brazil
- Occupations: Illegal lottery operator, LIESA president
- Known for: Involvement in Jogo do Bicho, President of LIESA
- Criminal charge: Involvement in illegal lottery operations
- Criminal penalty: Sentenced to six years in prison (later granted parole)

Ailton Guimarães Jorge (Rio de Janeiro, 24 November 1941), better known as Capitão Guimarães, is an illegal lottery operator (bicheiro) and the patron of samba school Unidos de Vila Isabel. He has been the president of the Independent League of Samba Schools of Rio de Janeiro (LIESA) from 1987 to 1993 and 2001–2007. An armed forces officer during the period of the military dictatorship, he is accused of participating in torture proceedings against political prisoners. After leaving the Army, he became a banker of the Jogo do Bicho.

== Army captain ==
Capitão Guimarães is a former army captain attached to the DOI-CODI involved in torture during the military dictatorship of Brazil (1964–1985). He operated out of Section II (Intelligence) of the Army Police in Rio's Vila Militar, a unit that, like all of the dictatorship's torture squads, received substantial rewards for capturing or killing left-wing militants.

He also got involved in contraband activities. The scheme was discovered and Guimarães and his gang were arrested. During their trial the gang members claimed the confessions had been extorted from them. Most of them said that after being beaten they had signed the confessions without reading them. In May 1979, the 21 accused were found innocent. In appeal the case was thrown out, ironically on the grounds of torture. But Guimarães’ military career had been compromised and he resigned from the Army.

== Bicheiro ==
After his army career he got involved in the Jogo do Bicho (the “animal game”), a very popular illegal lottery. He started out as a manager for the bicho banker Agostinho Lopes da Silva Júnior, also known as Guto, who controlled the game in Niterói, São Gonçalo, Itaboraí and Saquarema in the state of Rio. Guimarães was investigated for the kidnapping and disappearance, in June 1979, of Guto. The inquiry, however, did not find any culprits. After the mysterious disappearance of Guto, the chief bicheiro Tio Patinhas gave Guimarães Guto's bank. Within three years Guimarães gained a seat on the council of seven major bicho bankers, publishing the minutes of the meetings, adjudicating the territory of smaller bankers. His territory extended from Niterói, the lake region in Rio de Janeiro State and north to Espírito Santo.

According to judge Denise Frossard and public prosecutor Antônio Carlos Biscaia, the bicheiros built an association (known as the cupola do bicho), that controlled the illegal gambling business and shielded it from prosecution by corrupting authorities and police.> The cupola established itself when a power conflict between the bicheiros ceased at the beginning of the 1980s after the murder of an ex-policeman linked to the association that tried to intrude in the gambling racket in Niteroi controlled by Capitao Guimaraes and another prominent illegal gambling operator, Antonio Petrus Kalil, nicknamed Turcão. (The murder remained unsolved)

Following the example of his peers, he sought social legitimacy by patronizing the Unidos de Vila Isabel carnival society and became the top man in the Rio Carnival, presiding over LIESA from 1987 to 1993 and 2001–2007. Rich and famous, he dressed like a Christmas tree, with brightly coloured clothes and gold chains. He became one of the best-known leaders of organized crime in Rio. LIESA has a president and directors, but only one "commander": Captain Guimarães. Keeping in the shadows, Guimarães determines how the samba schools parade takes place. No important decision is made without him being consulted. He is also sought ("a hearing is requested") by other samba school leaders for "advice".

== Arrest and conviction ==
Capitão Guimarães was found guilty by judge Denise Frossard in 1993 of involvement in the Jogo do Bicho, along with 13 other bicho bankers such as Castor de Andrade. They were found responsible for at least 53 deaths. They were sentenced to six years each, the maximum sentence for racketeering. But in December 1996 they were all back on the streets, granted parole or clemency.

After the death of Castor de Andrade in 1997, Antonio Petrus Kalil, alias Turcão, and Capitão Guimarães became the most important bicheiros in Rio. "He’s the one who brought an organizational sense and structure to the game," judge Frossard said about Guimarães. "He also encouraged the group to try to capture the state, at all three levels of government and all three branches, instead of just paying off the police" according to Frossard, who has been the target of assassination attempts that she attributes to hired guns in the pay of game kingpins.

== New arrest and conviction ==
Capitão Guimarães, at the time president of the Independent League of Samba Schools, was among 24 people arrested on April 12, 2007, for alleged involvement with illegal numbers games, bingo parlours and the distribution of slot machines. Raids by the Federal Police have uncovered big payoffs to judges, police officers, prosecutors and lawyers from the bosses who run the game. Mounds of documents have been seized and US$6 million in cash has been confiscated. The raids were part of a major police operation, dubbed Operation Hurricane. Among the 25 arrests were fellow bicheiros Anísio Abraão David and Antonio Petrus Kalil.

Authorities considered Capitão Guimarães to be the animal game's boss of bosses. At a court hearing he said that he was active in the animal game only between 1982 and 1993 and that he made his living now as a "financial consultant," earning commissions of as much as $200,000 a month from clients investing in the stock market.

On March 13, 2012, he was sentenced to 48 years in prison and a fine of BRL 11 million (about USD 6 million) for formation of armed gangs, money laundering, smuggling and corruption, together with the other bicho bosses Anísio Abraão David and Antônio Petrus Kalil. The sentence was annulled by the Supreme Federal Court, but in December 2012 Capitão Guimarães, Kalil, Anísio and 19 others were again convicted by the Criminal Court in Rio de Janeiro. Capitão Guimarães was sentenced to 47 years and 9 months for conspiracy and corruption. The judge's sentence said that the bicheiros' criminal organisation had "an intense connection with the state, through the bribing of public officials, including in the police and the judiciary, and even with the political system, through the financing of political campaigns."

== Sources ==
- Frossard, Denise (2007). "Women in Organized Crime in Brazil". In Fiandaca, Giovanni (ed.). Women and the Mafia: Female Roles in Organized Crime Structures. New York: Springer. pp. 181–204. ISBN 0-387-36537-0.
