= Carangola =

Município de Carangola
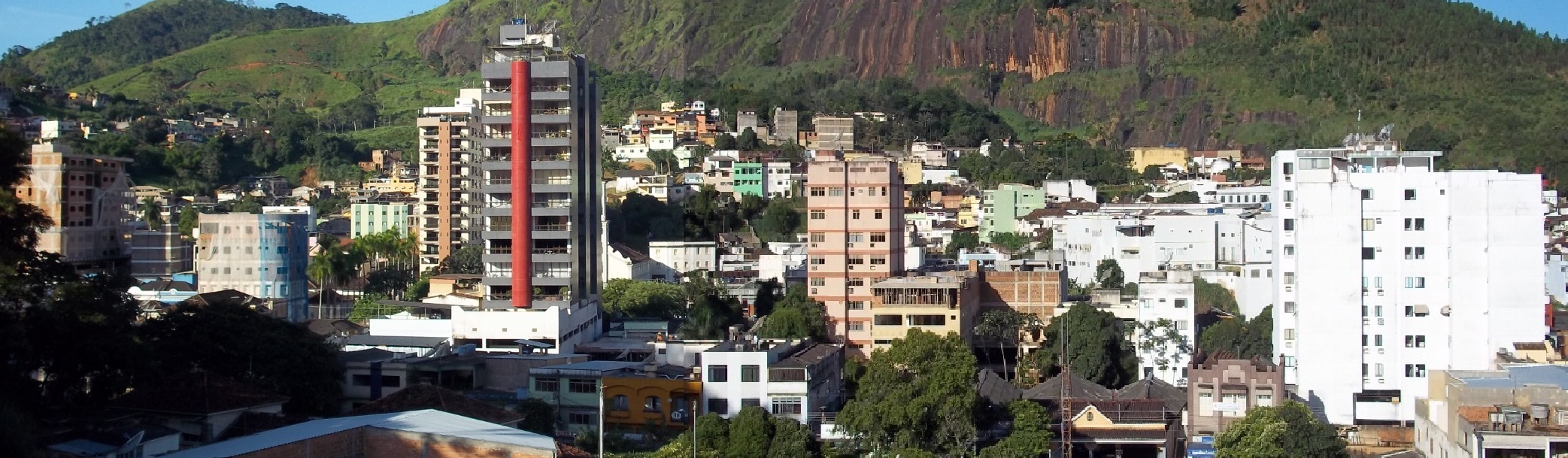

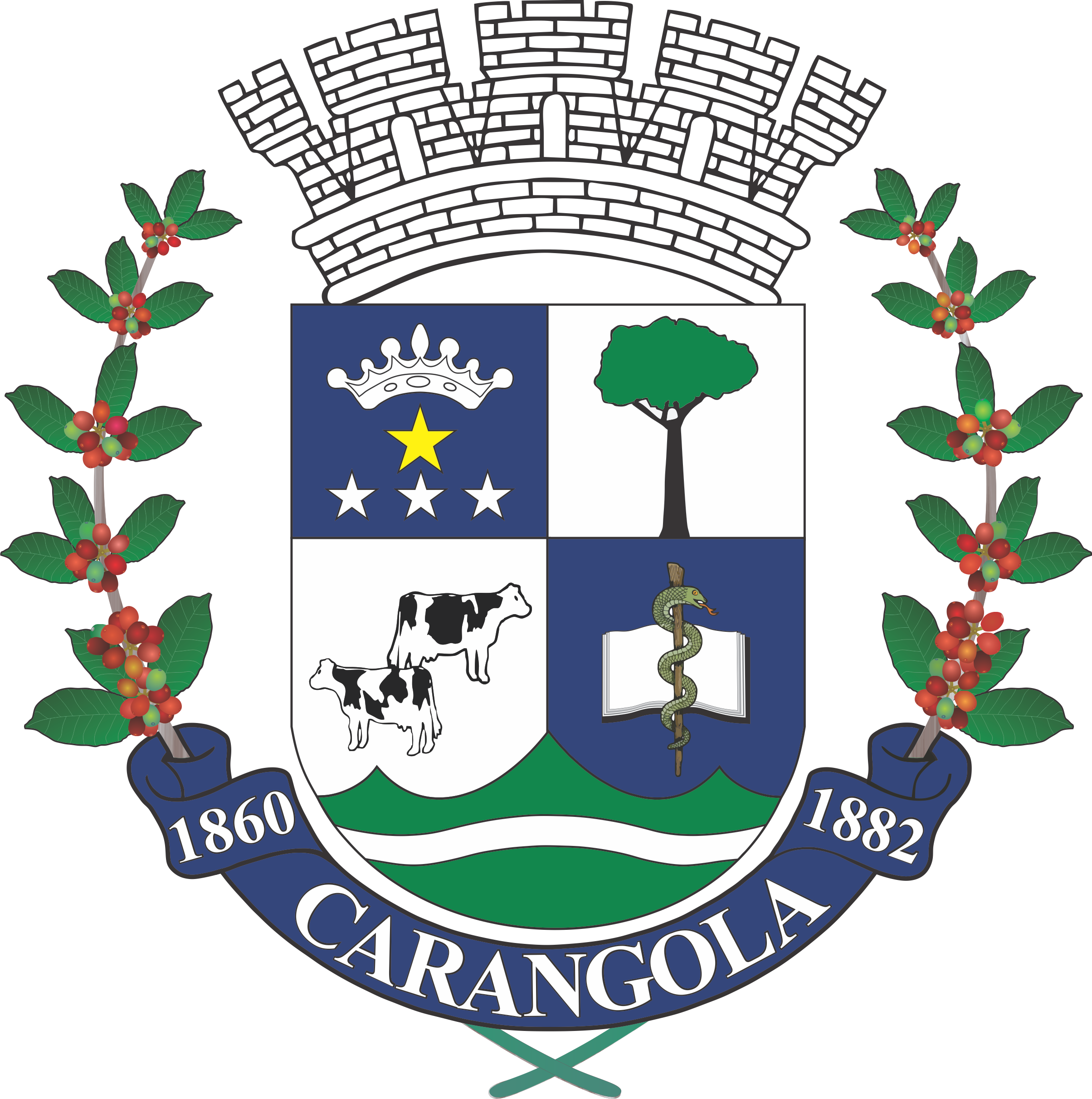
- Flag Coat of arms

- Location in the state of Minas Gerais
- Coordinates: 20°43′58″S 42°01′44″W
- Country: Brazil
- State: Minas Gerais
- Settled: 07/01/1882

Government
  - Mayor: Paulo Petersen (2017-2020)
- Elevation: 399 m (1,309 ft)

Population (2020)
  - Total: 33,011
  - Demonym: carangolense
- Time zone: UTC−3 (BRT)
- Postal Code (CEP): 36800-000
- Area code: 32 3741

Carangola is a Brazilian municipality in the state of Minas Gerais. The city belongs to the mesoregion of Zona da Mata. It is a university town, a main urban hub, and a commercial and industrial region.

== See also ==
- List of municipalities in Minas Gerais
