= Jogo do bicho =

Popular illegal gambling game in Brazil

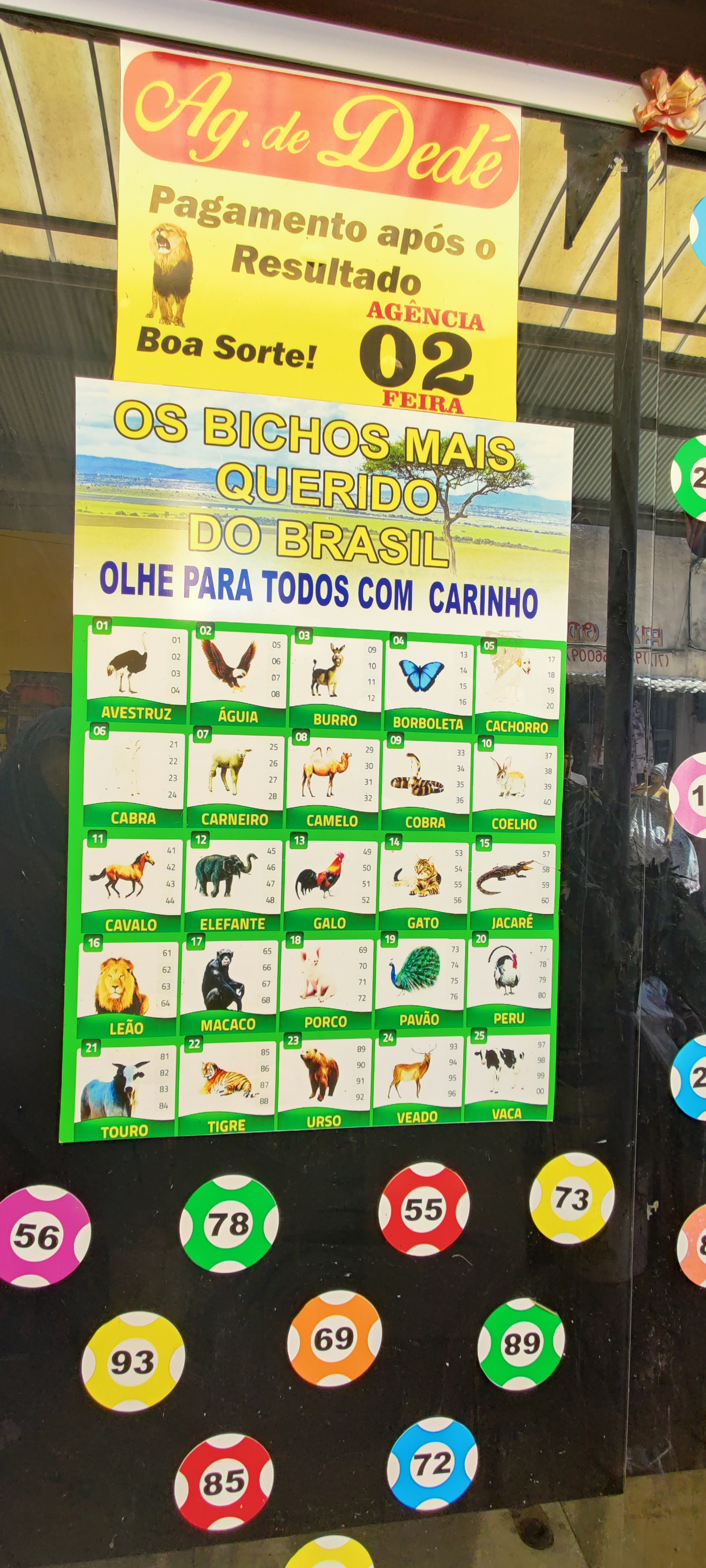
Jogo do bicho advertised in Salvador, Bahia.

Jogo do bicho (Portuguese pronunciation: [ˈʒogu du ˈbiʃu], "animal game") is an illegal gambling game in Brazil, prohibited by federal law since 1946, but nevertheless very popular throughout the country. It is a lottery-type drawing, operated on a regional basis using the daily state lottery draw, by criminals known as bicheiros, banqueiros ("bankers"), or contraventores. Despite its popularity, especially in Rio de Janeiro, it is illegal in 25 of the 26 states of Brazil plus the Federal District, and those involved may be prosecuted. Paraíba is the only state where the game is legal and regulated by the state, even though federal law prohibits gambling. Unlike most state-operated lotteries, in jogo do bicho any amount can be wagered.

A study by the Getúlio Vargas Foundation estimated that illegal gambling generated between R$ 1.3 billion and R$ 2.8 billion (US$550M and US$1.2B) in Brazil in 2014 — a figure that some considered to be an underestimate — which would make the game one of the biggest illegal lotteries in the world.

== History ==
The originator of jogo do bicho was baron João Batista Viana Drummond), a Brazilian-born Englishman, to whom Emperor Dom Pedro II awarded a title and the concession to the Rio de Janeiro Zoological Garden in the Vila Isabel neighborhood in the late 19th century. In 1892, as a publicity measure, Drummond encouraged visitors to guess the identity of an animal concealed behind a curtain, and paid prizes off to winners. In a few years the guessing game became a tremendously popular numbers game, with different numbers assigned to 25 animals.

Bets were soon being made by people outside the zoo. Within months, government authorities made its first attempt to shut down the game, but it simply shifted to the city, an environment in which it has thrived ever since. Rudyard Kipling, visiting Rio in the 1920s, wrote of seeing bookies wandering the streets carrying placards with colourful pictures of animals.

The game is said to have become popular because it accepted bets of any amount, in a time when most Brazilians struggled to survive a very deep economic crisis. "If you see two shacks lost somewhere in the backlands," a Brazilian diplomat once observed, "you can bet that a bicheiro lives in one of them and a steady bettor in the other."

For the following decades official policy fluctuated between tolerance of the game, sometimes motivated by corruption, and intermittent campaigns to crack down on gambling. The game has long history of problems with the law, but was banned definitively in 1941, when the law outlawing games of chance in Brazil was enacted. Despite its popularity and being tolerated by many authorities, gambling is a misdemeanour in Brazil, according to article 58 of the Criminal Misdemeanours Act (Decree-Law 3,688 of 3 October 1941). The people who exploit it are liable to imprisonment and a fine, and the gamblers are liable to a fine. In addition, Law 9215 of 1946 prohibited most kinds of gambling throughout Brazil. The 1941 decree and 1946 law marked the beginning of the jogo do bicho’s true criminalization.

Nevertheless, the game continued to thrive in illegality. A crackdown on the game by São Paulo police in 1966 nearly paralysed the city. More than 60,000 men were idled. By that time it had grown into a US$500 million-a-year business that employed roughly 1% of Brazil's total working force. The crisis was quietly resolved in return for unspecified concessions.

To foster public support, the bicheiros have invested part of their enormous earnings in activities, like the financing of samba schools and football clubs. From the early 1970s until now, nearly all of the Rio de Janeiro samba schools are under the control of bicheiros. Two football clubs famous for their association with such bosses were Bangu (with Castor de Andrade) and Botafogo (with Emil Pinheiro).

Since the early 1990s, bicheiros have expanded their activities to bingo parlors, video poker and slot machines, known in Brazil as "nickel hunters" (caça-níqueis).

According to an estimate in the mid-1990s the game involved over US$2 billion a year and employed about 50,000 people in Rio de Janeiro and provided income to 400,000 people in Brazil as a whole. It was reported by The New York Times in 2007 that it was played everywhere in Brazil, and especially in Rio de Janeiro, from where the scheme was operated by about a dozen bosses, called bicheiros.

=== In Paraíba ===
Paraíba is the only state where the game has been legalised at the state level, despite the federal law that prohibits it. The game is regulated by the State Lottery of Paraíba (LOTEP), which licenses banqueiros as lottery agents, to avoid the game's association with organized crime, as in Rio de Janeiro. The state capital, João Pessoa, has 15 authorised points. Each point pays a region-dependent monthly tax to LOTEP, depending on its business volume. The draw is made three times a day in the LOTEP building and released by the official state radio.

== Criminal charges and political connections ==
On 22 November 1991, the state's Attorney General Antônio Carlos Biscaia, filed a complaint and a request for imprisonment against the 14 members of Rio's Jogo do Bicho cúpula (central commission), whom he accuses of forming a gang that acted with the aim of guaranteeing and expanding its business not only in the illegal lottery, but also in drug trafficking. The investigation was launched in January 1986 and listed more than 60 murders related to their criminal enterprise.

The bicheiros – Castor de Andrade and his son Paulinho de Andrade; Ailton Guimarães Jorge ('Capitão Guimarães'); Anísio Abraão David; Luizinho Drummond; Antônio Petrus Kalil ('Turcão') and his brother José Petrus Kalil ('Zinho'); Waldemiro Garcia ('Miro') and his son Waldemir Paes Garcia ('Maninho'); Carlos Teixeira Martins ('Carlinhos Maracanã'); Raul Capitão; José Caruzzo Escafura ('Piruinha'); Haroldo Rodrigues Nunes ('Haroldo Saens Pena'); and Emil Pinheiro – were subsequently arrested for criminal association and forming armed gangs.

In May 1993, judge Denise Frossard convicted them to six years of prison for criminal association. Formally, 53 deaths were attributed to the group. "The animal game is a deeply embedded cultural phenomenon with a certain romantic aura, and thus hard to eradicate," according to Frossard. "But it is also a quintessentially Brazilian way of laundering money and contributes greatly to the problem of impunity in this country."

According to prosecutor Biscaia, the illicit organisation was a true Brazilian Mafia (he used the expression máfia tupiniquim). The bicheiros built an association with the principal goal to corrupt authorities and police and the elimination of 130 people. The superintendent of this association was Castor de Andrade. They were sentenced to six years each, the maximum sentence for racketeering. The sentence, however, was modified by the Supreme Federal Court (STF), which reduced the penalty by half. Through appeals, lawyers managed to exclude the offence of formation of an armed gang. In December 1996 they were all back on the streets, granted parole or clemency.

In March 1994, police raided the stronghold of Castor de Andrade in Bangu. They seized 200 account books and 167 computer diskettes. Former president Fernando Collor de Mello, Rio governor Nilo Batista, São Paulo mayor Paulo Maluf, Rio mayor Cesar Maia, seven entrepreneurs, three judges, 12 congressmen and seven assemblymen, 25 police commissioners, and 100 police officers were implicated.

Antonio Petrus Kalil, Anísio Abraão David and Capitão Guimarães, at the time president of the Independent League of Samba Schools of Rio de Janeiro, were again arrested on 12 April 2007, together with 24 people, for alleged involvement with illegal numbers games, bingo parlors and the distribution of slot machines. Raids by the Federal Police have uncovered big payoffs to judges, police officers, prosecutors and lawyers from the bosses who run the game. Mounds of documents have been seized and US$6 million in cash has been confiscated.

The possibility of legalisation has been often been argued, but no practical decision ever made.

In 2021, the government of the state of Ceará authorized the game to operate within the state.

== Structure ==
Since its early inception the game has preserved a hierarchy: operators (banqueiros), managers (gerentes) and dealers (vendedores). This same hierarchy was later reproduced in the organisation of drug-trafficking and other types of organised crime in Brazil.

Bets are taken at pontos (points-of-sale) where dealers collect money and keep record of the bets. The bets (and the money) are sent to the central operator (banca), where the draw is done. All it takes is a scribbled note or a phone call to any of the thousands of bicheiros who haunt the street corners, shops and offices of every city, easily identified by their sunglasses, cigars and/or typical floral or printed shirts. Neither the pontos nor the bancas need a fixed operational centre. Most pontos are simple stools or wooden boxes on which the dealers sit through the day.

Drawings are usually held at 14:00 in local bicho headquarters, and the winning numbers are immediately dispatched by taxi and bicycle and scribbled in chalk on designated walls and lampposts. Phone lines become so clogged after each drawing that telephone company executives call it "the bicho hour."

The draw is not fair: if too many people bet on a given number, it is removed from the lot to prevent the quebra da banca (bankruptcy). This is necessary because most bancas operate with narrow margins and without much money in reserve.

To prevent quebra da banca, a system named Paratodos ("for all") is used for bicheiros to redistribute bets to other, often more powerful banqueiros who have territorial control over the city or area.

== Description ==
=== Animals ===
The name of the game arises from the mnemonic association of the drawn numbers with a random selection of 25 animals:

Group	01				02				03				04				05			
Animal	Avestruz (Ostrich)				Águia (Eagle)				Burro (Donkey)				Borboleta (Butterfly)				Cachorro (Dog)			
Series of numbers	01	02	03	04	05	06	07	08	09	10	11	12	13	14	15	16	17	18	19	20
Group	06				07				08				09				10			
Animal	Cabra (Goat)				Carneiro (Ram)				Camelo (Camel)				Cobra (Snake)				Coelho (Rabbit)			
Series of numbers	21	22	23	24	25	26	27	28	29	30	31	32	33	34	35	36	37	38	39	40
Group	11				12				13				14				15			
Animal	Cavalo (Horse)				Elefante (Elephant)				Galo (Rooster)				Gato (Cat)				Jacaré (Alligator or Caiman)			
Series of numbers	41	42	43	44	45	46	47	48	49	50	51	52	53	54	55	56	57	58	59	60
Group	16				17				18				19				20			
Animal	Leão (Lion)				Macaco (Monkey)				Porco (Pig)				Pavão (Peacock)				Peru (Turkey)			
Series of numbers	61	62	63	64	65	66	67	68	69	70	71	72	73	74	75	76	77	78	79	80
Group	21				22				23				24				25			
Animal	Touro (Bull)				Tigre (Tiger)				Urso (Bear)				Veado (Deer)				Vaca (Cow)			
Series of numbers	81	82	83	84	85	86	87	88	89	90	91	92	93	94	95	96	97	98	99	100

=== Superstition ===
Over the decades, superstitious theory has evolved around selecting the proper animal, much of it involving dreams. Horse, for example, can be indicated by a dream of a horse, or by dreams of wheat or milk or naked women. The elephant has come to be associated with death, and whenever there is a fatal traffic accident involving a car with one of the elephant's numbers (45-48) on its license plates, the betting is unusually heavy. When the Rio papers published the picture of a derailed locomotive in the 1960s, so many bet on the last four figures of its registration number that the bicheiros were forced to warn that they could not pay off at the usual odds if it won.

=== Bets and prizes ===
Each of the 25 animals is assigned a sequence of four consecutive numbers between 1 and 100. The most common way to play is to bet one real on an animal, but one can also choose a combination of numbers and numerals designated by an animal. The traditional types of prizes are as follows:

- Cabeça ("head"): A bet on four numbers between 00 and 99, represented by an animal; chance of success 1 in 25.
- Dezena ("ten"): A bet on a number from 00 to 99; chance of success 1 in 100.
- Centena ("hundred"): A bet on a number from 000 to 999; chance of success 1 in 1,000.
- Milhar ("thousand"): A bet on a number from 0000 to 9999; chance of success 1 in 10,000.
- Terno de dezena ("three tens"): Where multiple numbers are drawn, a bet on three numbers between 00 and 99, chance of success 1 in 161,700; highest payout where available.

If the last two numerals in either the daily state lottery draw or the Loteria popular ("popular lottery") form one of the four numbers associated with an animal, a bicheiro will pay out 15 reais for a bet of 1 real.

== Cultural impact ==
Despite its illegality, the game has left significant cultural influences in Brazilian society, even among people that have never played it.

Jogo do bicho is responsible for the strong association of the number 24 with homosexuality in Brazil. In the game, 24 is the number given to the deer (veado in Portuguese), an animal that has long been pejoratively associated with gay men (insulted as viados).

The jersey number 24 is heavily avoided by male Brazilian athletes, with rare exceptions. Football players, for example, usually reject this number for their jerseys, and may express dissatisfaction when obligated to wear a 24 jersey due to fixed number rules in international competitions. In 2022, only 4 teams in the Brasileirão use the jersey 24: América-MG, Internacional de Porto Alegre, Santos FC and Sport Club Corinthians Paulista. In the Copa América 2019, hosted by Brazil, its national team was the only one not displaying the number. The taboo was broken during the 2022 FIFA World Cup, when Gleison Bremer wore number 24 in Brazil's match against Cameroon. The new FIFA rules allowed up to 26 players numbered sequentially.

24 is also used in politics, as many LGBT candidates include 24 in their campaign numbers, to be easily associated with LGBT movement causes. For the same reason, the number is seldom used by heterosexual politicians, whether or not they have an anti-LGBT agenda. In the Brazilian Senate, for example, although there are 81 Senators, no one currently has a cabinet numbered 24, nor a car plate numbered SF-0024 (the Senators' plate options go from SF-0001 to SF-0095, and any available number can be freely chosen).

Another legacy of Jogo do Bicho is the use of zebra meaning upset. In 1964, before a football match between Portuguesa (RJ) and Vasco da Gama, the manager of Portuguesa, a much weaker team, was asked if he could defeat Vasco. Gentil Cardoso, the manager, commented that beating Vasco would be like drawing a zebra in Jogo do Bicho. As there is no zebra in the game, his sentence expressed an impossibility. However, Portuguesa did win that game (by 2-1), and since then the term zebra is used in Brazil for upsets.

Treze Futebol Clube, a football club from Paraíba, has a rooster as their mascot, because treze means thirteen, and the rooster is the 13th animal of the Jogo do bicho. Another football team with the rooster as its mascot is Clube Atlético Mineiro, whose supporters expected 2013 to be the "year of the rooster", also because the rooster is the 13th animal. Atlético Mineiro won their first Libertadores Cup in 2013, confirming the expectation for an important title in that year.

== See also ==
- Bolita
- Numbers game

== Sources ==
- Andrade, Maria do Carmo (2009). "Jogo do Bicho". Pesquisa Escolar On-Line. Joaquim Nabuco Foundation.
- Chazkel, Amy (2011). Laws of Chance: Brazil's Clandestine Lottery and the Making of Urban Public Life. Durham NC/London: Duke University Press. ISBN 978-0-8223-4973-0.
- Coelho, Daniel N. (Spring 2018). "Territorial and Corrosive: The "jogo do bicho" (Animal Game) and Organized Crime in Brazil" (PDF). International Journal on Criminology. 6 (1): 7–38. doi:10.18278/ijc.6.1.1.
- Magalhães, Felipe Santos (2005). Ganhou Leva...Do vale o impresso ao vale o escrito. Uma História Social do Jogo do Bicho no Rio de Janeiro (1890–1960) (PDF) (Thesis) (in Portuguese). Rio de Janeiro: Universidade Federal do Rio de Janeiro, Instituto de Filosofia e Ciências Sociais, Departemento de História.
