= Italian immigration in Minas Gerais =

State in Southeastern Brazil

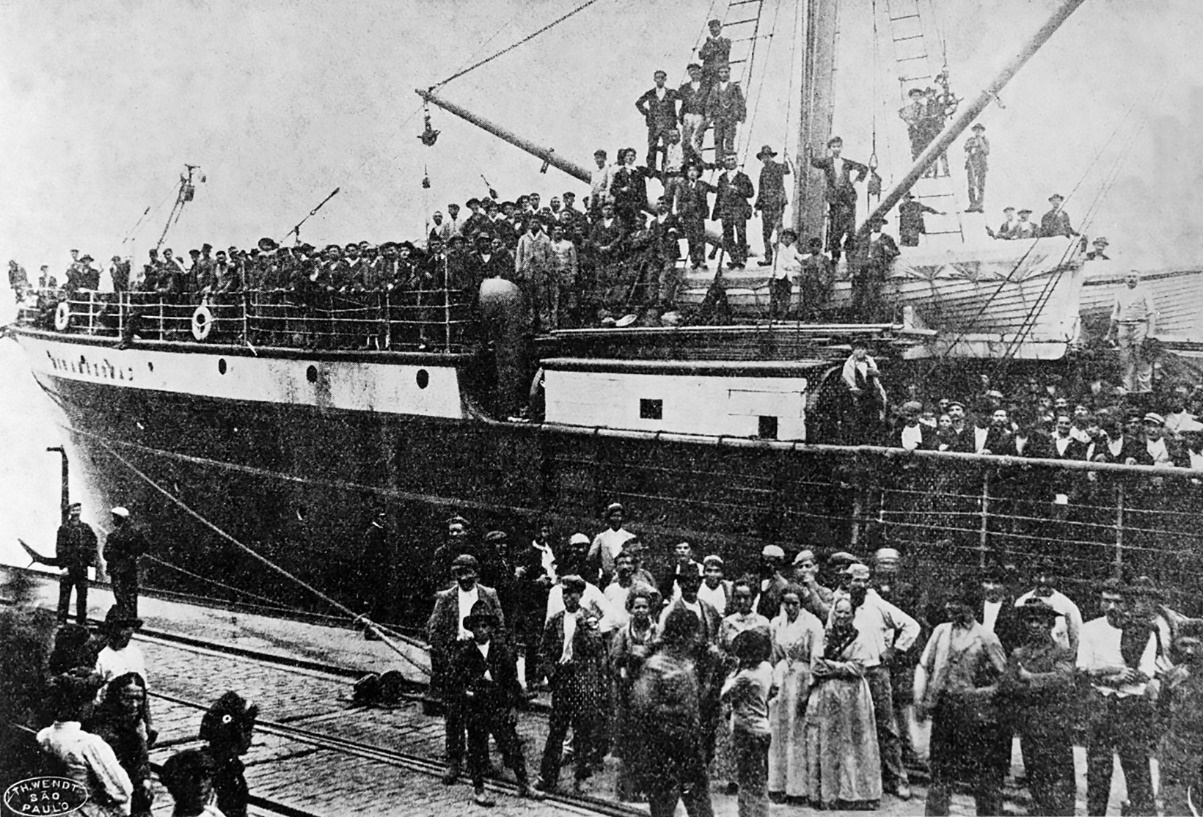
Ship with Italians in the port of Santos (1907).

The Italian immigration in Minas Gerais was the migratory movement of Italians to the Brazilian state of Minas Gerais that occurred between the end of the 19th century and the first decades of the 20th century. It was one of the states that received the most Italian immigrants in Brazil, only behind São Paulo and Rio Grande do Sul.

At the end of the 19th century, the economic situation in Italy was not favorable, with a decline in agricultural and industrial activities, and thousands of Italians began to migrate to other countries, including Brazil.

The Italian immigrants entered the Minas Gerais society predominantly as a labor force destined for the coffee activity. However, as time went by, their participation expanded to other activities, especially in the urban environment, where they actively participated in the development of commerce and industry. The assimilation of Italians in Minas Gerais was quick and peaceful. In this state, no closed Italian communities were formed, and the immigrants were dispersed throughout an extensive territory, where they were a minority in what was then the most populous Brazilian state.

== History ==
The Italian immigration to Minas Gerais, from the end of the 19th century, was closely linked to the end of the slave trade (Eusébio de Queirós Law, of 1850) and the abolition of slavery (Golden Law, of 1888). Since the middle of the 19th century, with the prohibition of the entry of new enslaved Africans, the lack of labor that began to install itself in the country encouraged the arrival of an increasing number of European immigrants.

Italian population in Minas Gerais
Year	Number of Italians
1872	145^{b}
1896	25,000^{a}
1900	55,000^{a}
1910	50,000^{a}
1920	42,943^{b}
1940	18,819^{b}
1950	11,704^{b}
1970	5,227^{b}
^a For 1896, 1900 and 1910, these are estimates.
^b For 1872, 1920, 1940, 1950 and 1970, the data are from the census.

Italy was going through great social difficulties: poverty and unemployment, an industrial process that led to the marginalization of labor, and, above all, a crisis in the countryside due to overpopulation and lack of land. Soon after the Italian Unification of 1871, the country entered a migratory process. According to the Brazilian Institute of Geography and Statistics (IBGE):

"In the specific case of Italy, after a long period of more than 20 years of fighting for the unification of the country, its population, particularly the rural and poorer one, found it difficult to survive either on the small farms they owned or where they simply worked, or in the cities, to which they moved in search of work. Under these conditions, therefore, emigration was not only stimulated by the Italian government but was also a survival solution for the families. Thus, it is possible to understand the departure of about 7 million Italians in the period between 1860 and 1920."

Between 1880 and 1969, about 1.5 million Italians immigrated to Brazil; about 70% of them went to the state of São Paulo. Until 1902, subsidized immigration from Northern Italy predominated, in which the Brazilian government paid for the immigrants' transportation by ship, sending them mainly to the colonial nuclei or the coffee plantations (where they replaced slave labor). However, in 1902, the Italian government issued the Prinetti Decree, which prohibited subsidized immigration to Brazil, as a result of increasingly frequent reports that Italian immigrants were being subjected to conditions of semi-slavery on Brazilian coffee farms. From then on, Italians who wanted to immigrate to Brazil would have to pay for their ship tickets. Immigration did not end, but it decreased considerably. Immigration from southern Italy also became predominant, with a significant part going to urban centers.

The Italians were the main group of immigrants to enter Brazil at the end of the 19th century. According to an estimate, in 1900 there were 540,000 Italians living in Brazil, that is, 3.1% of the country's population was born in Italy. For the year 1902, the number of Italians jumped to 600 thousand. The 1920 national census counted 558,405 Italians (52% of the foreigners in Brazil, 71% concentrated in the state of São Paulo). The census did not count the children, grandchildren, and descendants of Italians, because anyone born in Brazil was counted as Brazilian, regardless of being the child of foreigners. The 1940 census innovated by asking Brazilians if they were the children of foreigners. In this census, 1,260,931 Brazilians said they had an Italian father, while 1,069,862 said they had an Italian mother. But this data is limited, because grandchildren, great-grandchildren, and other descendants of foreigners were not asked about their family origin, only their children.

Entry of Italians in Brazil, between 1884 and 1959.
Period	1884-1893	1894-1903	1904-1913	1914-1923	1924-1933	1934-1944	1945-1949	1950-1954	1955-1959	Total
Numbers	510,533	537,784	196,521	86,320	70,177	not available	15,312	59,785	31,263	1,507,695

== Italians in Minas Gerais ==
=== Predecessors ===
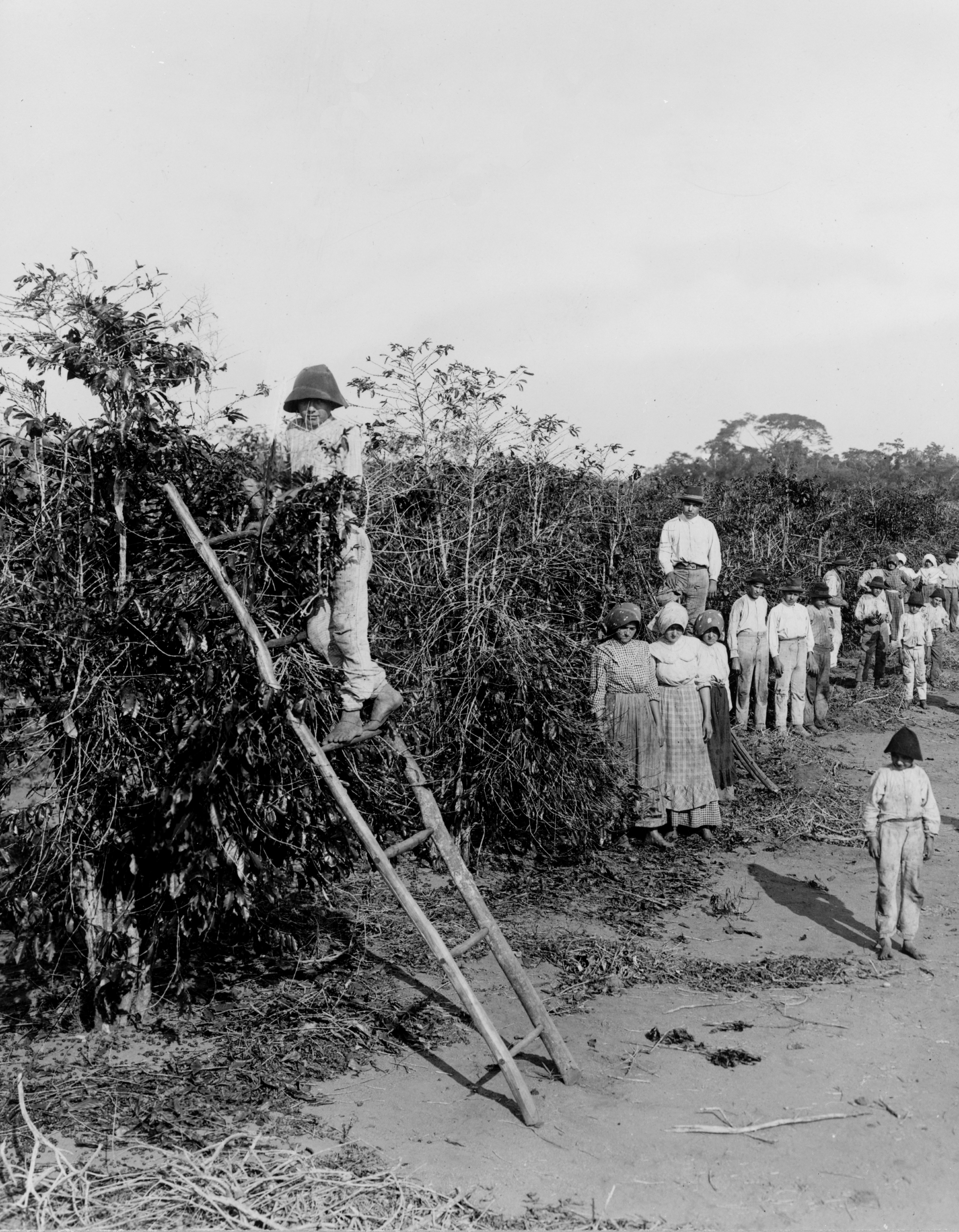
Italian immigrants on a Brazilian coffee plantation in the early 20th century.

Coffee production helped recover Minas Gerais' public finances, which had been in decline since the end of the gold cycle. In 1818/19, coffee represented only 3% of Minas Gerais exports. In the 1850s, it was already the main export product, and the tax from coffee represented 49% of the total exported. In the 1885/89 period, this tax percentage rose to 80%. Minas Gerais became the second-largest coffee producer in the country from the last decade of the Empire until 1930. In the 19th century, labor on the coffee plantations was heavily based on slavery. However, in the second half of the century, slavery entered a gradual process of decline. In 1850, the Brazilian Parliament abolished the slave trade, through the Eusébio de Queirós Law. In 1888, the Golden Law was passed, which definitively abolished slavery on Brazilian territory.

With the abolition of slavery, there was a great exodus of former slaves. On most of the farms, the former slaves refused to continue in their jobs. According to Emília Viotti da Costa, for the freedmen, freedom consisted "above all, in the right to leave, to move freely, to leave the plantation, to work where, how and when they wanted". The province and later the state of Minas Gerais had the largest population in Brazil and supposedly had enough labor force to substitute the former slaves. With the end of slavery, coffee growers could no longer force people to work for them; they would have to offer minimally advantageous conditions to attract free workers. However, the work conditions on the coffee plantations, in general, were terrible: one worked hard and earned little, and sometimes was treated badly by the farmer or their henchmen. Vestiges of slavery still existed. The conditions on the coffee farms in Minas Gerais were even worse than those in São Paulo since the latter provided better salaries, as well as guarantees through contracts or partnership agreements.

Contrary to what happened in São Paulo, where immigrants, after 1886, were the main labor force in the coffee plantations, in Minas Gerais the Brazilian workers were the ones who sustained the coffee production, despite being labeled as "lazy" by the farmers. The "instability" attributed to the Brazilian worker, however, was not greater than that found in the European worker. Proof of this is that in São Paulo, the behavior of the European worker also generated general crises in the plantation. The Europeans were resistant to submit to the terrible work conditions offered by the coffee growers and reacted through strikes and other manifestations, besides being able to count on the consulate's help. For the Brazilian worker, the only form of defense was to abandon the farm and move to another one. The problem, then, was not in the "Brazilian worker," but in the terrible work conditions offered.

=== Subsidized immigration for agriculture ===
In the 19th century, subsidized immigration had two aspects: the first consisted in settling European peasant families in the so-called colonial nuclei, where they were converted into small rural landowners, and the second consisted in increasing the number of people in the coffee plantations, to face the problem posed by the process of transition from slave to wage labor.

Among the reasons why the Minas Gerais government encouraged immigration, especially Italian immigration, were:

- Although Minas Gerais had the largest free population in Brazil, which could, in theory, make up for the labor shortage with the abolition of slavery, the population of Minas Gerais was relatively sparse. As a result, many free workers could count on relatively abundant land to develop subsistence agriculture, without having to work for the large landowners to survive.
- In Brazilian culture, manual labor was despised and seen as "slave labor". Many free Brazilians or former slaves refused to work as wage earners on the coffee plantations, as this caused prejudice.
- The Minas Gerais government saw immigration not only as a solution to the labor problem in coffee but also as a means to develop local agriculture, due to the unfamiliarity or resistance of Brazilians to use more efficient land exploitation techniques. Many of the Italian immigrants in Minas Gerais were farmers from Northern Italy with great experience in land management, a strategic resource that helped modernize the state's economy.
- The neighboring state of São Paulo was growing rich thanks to coffee exports largely based on Italian labor. The Minas Gerais government, then, used the same strategy.
- Besides economic factors, European immigration was also inserted in a context of the "whitening" of Brazilian society, defended by intellectuals and members of the political class of the time, who saw the country's ethnic composition as one of the reasons for Brazil's backwardness.

However, there were several factors that limited immigration to Minas Gerais:

- The government did not have the same financial resources to subsidize the transportation of the immigrants, as the São Paulo government did. Subsidized immigration in Minas Gerais lasted around ten years, from 1888 to 1898, due to a financial crisis.
- Until 1893, the state of Minas Gerais paid for the immigrants' transportation but after arrival in Brazil, the latter had to pay back two-thirds of it, and the farmers themselves were forced to contribute. In contrast, the state of São Paulo paid the full amount. Only in 1894 did Minas Gerais begin to fund the full amount, which coincided with the great increase in the arrival of Italians in the state, but this subsidy was abandoned in 1898 due to the financial crisis.
- In São Paulo, coffee was expanding westward, where free immigrant labor, predominantly Italian, was introduced. In Minas Gerais, there was no expanding agricultural frontier.
- Minas Gerais had a large population contingent, which facilitated the replacement of slave labor with the available local labor, composed of freemen and former slaves, without the need to attract a large number of immigrants, unlike what happened in São Paulo, which had a smaller population. What worried the coffee growers in Minas Gerais was not the lack of labor, but the little stability of the Brazilian Man, who tended not to stay working on the same farm for a long time, thus creating uncertainties about the availability of national labor.
- The immigration policy in Minas Gerais was quite decentralized, delegating to the municipal councils the initiative to promote immigration, but few were interested in doing it.
- In the coffee farms of the state, the system of "sharecropping" predominated, which was less economically advantageous for the immigrants than the systems of "leasing of services" and "colonato" (process of importing foreign labor), which predominated in São Paulo. Therefore, it was more advantageous to immigrate to São Paulo.
- During the First Brazilian Republic, the Minas Gerais economy was not very dynamic, with coffee as the only product valued by the government. There were few job opportunities in other areas, making the state unattractive to immigrants. Although it was the most populous state in the country, in 1907, of the 2,938 industries existing in Brazil, 17% were in Minas Gerais, a rate that worsened in 1920: of the 13,336 industries, only 9.3% were in the state, behind São Paulo (31%), Rio Grande do Sul (13%) and the Federal District (Rio de Janeiro) (12%).

=== The ideal immigrant ===
In 1892, aiming to know the reality of farming, the Minas Gerais government sent a questionnaire to the municipal councils, the district councils, and several landowners. It contained questions about several aspects of the Minas Gerais economy. In the question about which nationality of workers they preferred, the one that received the most votes was Chinese. The Chinese had a great reputation as workers and were "less demanding" of their rights, being much more submissive than the Europeans, who were already enlightened and, consequently, demanding. In 1894, the City Council of São João Nepomuceno managed to get subsidies from the state for the transportation of Chinese immigrants. However, the Brazilian government made it difficult for them to enter the country, since only European immigrants were entitled to subsidized transportation. Finally, the difficulties in diplomatic relations between Brazil and China and the break of the war against Japan buried the attempts to attract the Chinese.

The second most popular nationality in the survey was Portuguese. In 1896, a tax agency, subordinate to the Superintendence, was installed in Lisbon, in charge of advertising and attracting Portuguese immigrants to Minas Gerais. However, the Portuguese government hindered the agency's activities, as it was unable to lower the price of ship tickets. As a result, Portuguese immigration to Minas Gerais in this period was inexpressive. The third most popular nationality was Brazilian. The Spanish, despite being the second most important group in numbers in the state in the context of subsidized immigration, after the Italians, also never arrived in large numbers. The Minas Gerais landowner had no interest in the Spanish immigrant, as the latter was considered too aggressive and demanding.

In 1896, the Superintendence contacted the Consul General of Brazil in Stockholm, wishing to attract immigrants from Sweden. However, Swedish laws imposed heavy burdens on emigration agents and the project was abandoned. In 1897, as an experiment, Minas Gerais brought 173 immigrants from Austria. However, the Austrians were too demanding, rejecting wage labor in the coffee plantations and demanding placement in colonial centers. As a result, the Superintendence suspended immigration from that country.

German immigration, on the other hand, was accepted and looked upon favorably by the miners. However, German legislation was very strict and did not allow open propaganda in favor of emigration in their territory. This hampered any attempt to attract immigrants from Germany.

As a result, the only group that immigrated en masse to Minas Gerais in the last quarter of the 19th century was the Italian. They adapted relatively well to the customs of Brazil, were considered excellent workers, and got used with some ease to the system of partnership or sharecropping. Influenced by São Paulo, where the labor in farming, almost exclusively from Italy, bore good fruit, it also fell to the Italian the choice of Minas Gerais, especially the immigrant from Northern Italy.

== Poorly stimulated immigration ==
Until the year 1892, Minas invested in the colonial nuclei. Very few prospered, where there were German, Italian, and Portuguese settlers. Few immigrants came to the state in this period. However, from 1892 to 1907, the state invested heavily in advertising, especially in Italy and later in Portugal, to bring immigrants to the coffee plantations and this was the time when more immigrants arrived. With the coffee crisis, from 1907 to 1930, the immigration growth in Minas was almost exclusively due to the colonial nuclei, but few foreigners continued to arrive in this period.

In Minas Gerais, immigrants were concentrated in only three specific regions: Belo Horizonte, which had been recently inaugurated; the South of Minas and the Zona da Mata, regions that concentrated the coffee plantations and also had some colonial nuclei. Thus, foreigners, working as wage earners or settlers, had some significance in the rural environment of Minas Gerais. On the other hand, their role was insignificant in the industrialization process. According to the 1920 census, about 68% of the industries in São Paulo belonged to foreigners, while in Minas Gerais it was only 7%.

Although Minas Gerais created numerous laws that encouraged immigration, they never materialized because the government did little to put them into practice. Thus, immigration was timid in the state. Between 1894 and 1907, the Hospedaria Horta Barbosa registered the entrance of 52,582 immigrants in Minas Gerais, the height of immigration in the state. In comparison, from 1890 to 1899, 735,076 immigrants entered the state of São Paulo. Despite this, Minas Gerais ranked among the three states that received the most Italians in Brazil.

Entry of Italians in Minas Gerais, between 1894 and 1901.
1894	1895	1896	1897	1898	1899	1900	1901	Total
4,410	6,422	18,999	17,303	2,111	650	21	41	49,957

It is not known exactly how many Italians immigrated to Minas Gerais. Based on the existing records in the Hospedaria Horta Barbosa in Juiz de Fora, 68,474 Italian immigrants entered the state between 1888 and 1901. For the period from 1872 to 1930, this number rose to 77,483, a quantity close to the contingent received by Rio Grande do Sul. However, not all Italians who immigrated to Minas Gerais stayed there since many returned to Italy or migrated to other Brazilian states. However, in the same way that many left, many others entered, for Minas Gerais also received many Italians coming from Espírito Santo, Rio de Janeiro, São Paulo, and other areas, attracted by coffee production as well as opportunities generated by the construction of the new capital, the expansion of the railway network, and the medium-sized cities of the countryside.

The 1920 census showed that Minas Gerais had the third-largest Italian population in Brazil, behind only São Paulo and Rio Grande do Sul:

Italian population in Brazil, by states, in the 1920 census.
State	Number of Italians
São Paulo	398,797
Rio Grande do Sul	49,136
Minas Gerais	42,943
Federal District and Rio de Janeiro	31,929
Espírito Santo	12,553
Paraná	9,046
Santa Catarina	8,062
Other states	5,939
Total in Brazil	558,405

=== The contracts ===
Officially, subsidized immigration in Minas Gerais began in 1867 and lasted until 1879. As a consequence of the poor results, it was abandoned and resumed in the 1880s with the publication of several laws and regulations. To this end, the Immigration and Colonization Service was created, the Hospedaria de Imigrantes (place where immigrants were housed and welcomed) in Juiz de Fora was built, and Regulation 108 was issued, which created the General Inspectorate of Immigration in Juiz de Fora and established norms for the operation of the Hospedaria and the creation of colonial nuclei.

On May 25, 1888, the Minas Gerais government signed a contract with the Immigration Promotion Association, a private society formed by coffee growers and industrial entrepreneurs from the Zona da Mata, which committed to bringing 30 thousand immigrants to the state. It was agreed that the Association would bring, in the first year (1888), eight thousand immigrants and, in the following years (1889 and 1890), another twenty-two thousand. Moreover, the Provincial Law nº 3598, of August 29, 1888, authorized the celebration of a contract with Joaquim Machado Fagundes de Mello and Manoel Caetano de S. Lara to bring 25 thousand immigrants. The arrival of so many immigrants in this short period led the state to build the Hospedaria Horta Barbosa in the municipality of Juiz de Fora, which served to house the immigrants in transit.

The predominance of Italians already worried the government, which asked for greater diversification of nationalities. The Italians who were willing to immigrate to Minas Gerais had to answer a list of declarations, which aimed to prove whether they intended to be farmers, the target of the immigration policy. The government was concerned about keeping the immigrant in the state, preventing that they would be seduced to go to other places, as reports showed was happening in the Hospedaria itself. The state was spending money subsidizing the transportation of immigrants and wanted something in return. Therefore, it was concerned with directing the immigrant to an occupation, otherwise, they would only serve to swell the population of poor people that ended up resorting to begging.

In September 1897, the Jornal do Comércio reported a fact that illustrated this fear: the police were called after a fight between Italian beggars caused by the division of alms. The police came across forty Italian men, women, and children sharing the same house in the city of Juiz de Fora. According to the published article, "The Italians lived in a small house where no food was found, that was unhygienic and filthy, and the same individuals were equally filthy and ragged." To take the Italians to the police station, the subdelegate promised to give them bread, which he did. This degrading scene contrasted with another account in the same newspaper, from June, reproducing a note published in the Jornal do Brasil referring to the transportation of 25 families of Italians (105 people) destined to the América farm:

"We saw beautiful and strong people, true colonists, mostly from the province of Ferrara, where agriculture is more advanced, and the peasants are sober and robust. [...] This is the third wave of immigrants destined there, and where the colonists enjoy good health and already amass a fortune. This is true colonization, as the settler even before arriving in our country is already located."

Contract negotiations were mediated by interpreters who translated between Portuguese and Italian. At this time, many immigrants were deceived. The interpreters, in cahoots with the farmers, promised good treatment, and good wages, and convinced the immigrants to go to distant and impermeable farms and sign a work contract whose clauses were not always clear. As one Italian noted, "On these contracts depends the whole future of a family and it is quite painful to say, nobody assists the settler, nobody advises them to accept this or that contract, to choose this or that employer."

These very different accounts show the diversity of the situations experienced by Italian immigrants in Minas Gerais.

=== The Superintendence ===
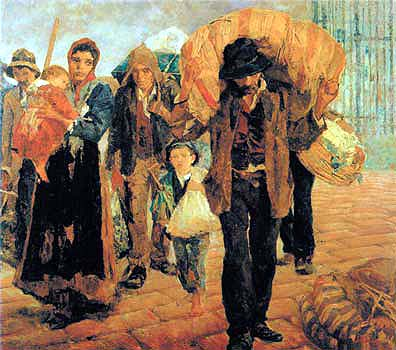
Os emigrantes ("The Emigrants"), by Antonio Rocco (1910).

Decree no. 612, from March 6, 1893, regulated Law no. 32, which represented a great advance in the immigration policy of Minas Gerais since it changed its administrative structure. From this moment on, the recruitment of immigrants was no longer done through contracts in Brazil but directly in Europe. To this end, the Superintendence of Immigration in Europe was created. Minas Gerais was the first state to establish an office of such importance abroad.

The Superintendence was not only an immigration commissariat, but also a general agency that mediated commercial and industrial relations between Minas Gerais and Europe. The headquarters of the Superintendence was initially placed in Genoa, as it was from there that the main migratory flow to Minas Gerais departed.

The initial concern of the Superintendence was the selection of immigrants. Before, when contracts with individuals were in force, the selection was at the discretion of the interests of the contracting companies. As they received a bribe on the number of individuals they brought, they focused on the quantity and not the qualification of the immigrants they sent to Minas Gerais. In general, the immigration companies had agents and subagents, all Italian, who received directly the requests of those who wanted to come. They were responsible for providing the documentation and paperwork that guaranteed the embarkation. Usually, the immigrant barely knew the country he was going to, or he left deluded as to which destination he truly preferred. Wishing to change this scenario, the Minas Gerais government took the initiative of installing a public office in Europe.

The existence of the Superintendence was not easy in Italy, mainly due to the bureaucracy. Italian law did not permit operations without a license. The Italian government needed to recognize the employees appointed by the Minas Gerais government to work in the sector, as well as pay heavy taxes proportional to the number of employees. The Superintendence could not exercise directly the activities of propaganda and selection of immigrants. This role was performed exclusively by Italian agents and sub-agents resident in the Kingdom.

Moreover, the intellectual sector of Italian society was opposed to immigration. Italian writers painted with somber colors the reality of immigration, especially to Brazil. The opposition also came from the Catholic Church. If spontaneous emigration was not accepted, artificial or provoked emigration was condemned.

The first measure taken by the Superintendence was to publicly explain the advantages of immigrating to Minas Gerais. This was done through constant publications in Italian periodicals, showing the natural riches, the mild climate, and the advantages and protections of the law to foreigners who wanted to settle in the state. The agency started to directly control and supervise emigration.

Again, the concern with the selection of the immigrant became essential. As soon as they arrived in Genoa, David Campista, director of the Superintendence, suspended all and any expedition of single individuals, fearful of exporting "dangerous elements" to Minas Gerais. It was an attempt to prevent individuals that the Italian public security was trying to keep away from the homeland from being sent to Minas Gerais. Despite all the apparatus to detect immigrants suspected of being criminals or subversives (anarchists, socialists, professional thieves, etc.) their inspection was not easy; as soon as they arrived in Minas Gerais, they had the habit of changing their names, leading to inconvenience for the Brazilian authorities.

The first great benefit obtained by the Superintendence was to be able to lower the price of the ship tickets. Through an agreement with the immigration company "La Veloce", the fixed price was the lowest regarding emigration to Brazil. Another advantage of the agreement was the use of the steamers of the Río de la Plata line, which were better than those destined for Brazil, on the route to Rio de Janeiro. A third advantage was the exclusion of immigrants from Southern Italy, that did not exist in the other Brazilian states. This proved advantageous, as the Southerners did not adapt well to agricultural work.

The most important factor consisted in the freedom of action of the service, with expeditions made on fixed dates, utilizing regularly established lines and not at random of the existing load. The results were encouraging: in 1895, 5,507 Italians were brought to Minas Gerais. Between 1894 and 1901, 75 steamers, in a total of 213 trips, transported 47,096 Italians to the state. However, the Superintendence's existence was short-lived: the Minas Gerais government, entering a process of financial retraction, was forced to close its activities in 1898.

== The colonial nuclei ==
The agricultural colonies formed by Italians did not have great relevance in the immigration context of Minas Gerais, contrary to what occurred in the southern states. In 1898, the colony of Caxias do Sul, in Rio Grande do Sul, had, alone, a significant population of 25 thousand people, almost all Italians. On the other hand, in 1900, in the whole state of Minas Gerais, the colonies had only 2,882 people. The colonial nuclei were agricultural areas in which the immigrants lived as smallholders. These nuclei only prospered in the regions where there were no coffee plantations, such as in the southern states and even in the neighboring state of Espírito Santo. In the coffee regions, such as São Paulo and Minas Gerais, the land available for colonization was marginal and scarce, and the migratory flow was preferentially destined for the coffee plantations, since the coffee growers, who held great political and economic power in the First Brazilian Republic, put pressure on the government to provide large numbers of workers for their properties.

In 1894, there were four colonial nuclei maintained by the state in Minas Gerais, in which 1,920 individuals lived, 1,360 of them foreigners, besides a private nucleus, the Ferreira Alves, in São João Nepomuceno, which had 250 people. Law 150 of 1896 authorized the creation of six new nuclei, which allowed the demarcation of lots in the suburbs of the capital. The colonies aimed to attach the immigrant to the soil and also, in Belo Horizonte, to give a final destination to the part of the Italian labor force that was attracted to build the capital in the period of 1895–1897. In 1900, the nuclei were "in frank prosperity", and comprised a population of 2,882 individuals. In 1902, there were eight colonial nuclei in the state, five of which were in Belo Horizonte.

From the end of the 19th century, the Italian immigration flow in the state, which previously went massively to the coffee farms, began to be diverted to the colonial nuclei. In 1912, the number of colonies in Minas Gerais had grown to twelve, in which 4,725 individuals lived. In addition, there were two federal nuclei with 1,487 people, totaling 6,612 colonists. That year, the Minas Gerais government announced that it had made a contract to bring in 4,000 farming families of different European nationalities.

The colonies in Minas Gerais were not formed only by foreigners, and the presence of Brazilians in them was quite significant. Although in some cases there was a numerical preponderance of immigrants, there was never the formation of closed colonies, because none was made up exclusively of foreigners.

In 1898, there were four colonial nuclei populated by Italians in Minas Gerais and maintained by the State: Rodrigo Silva, near Barbacena; Maria Custódia, in the municipality of Sabará; Barreiros, near Belo Horizonte; and São João del-Rei. The situation of the Italians settled in Barbacena was terrible, as published by the Italian newspaper Il Resto del Carlino, in February 1889:

"We have learned of many letters sent by immigrants from our province who are now in Barbacena (Brazil) to relatives and friends in which it is said that they are in the most miserable conditions imaginable, nor is there any hope of improvement."

In the South of Brazil, many Italian colonies gave rise to cities. In Minas Gerais, this phenomenon did not happen, because the colonies were normally built near commercial centers. With the growth of the surrounding cities, the colonies ended up being absorbed and their inhabitants incorporated into the urban populations. This is what happened in Belo Horizonte, where the colonies were completely absorbed by the urban area, giving rise to new neighborhoods such as Carlos Prates, Lagoinha, Horto, and Santa Efigênia.

=== Belo Horizonte ===
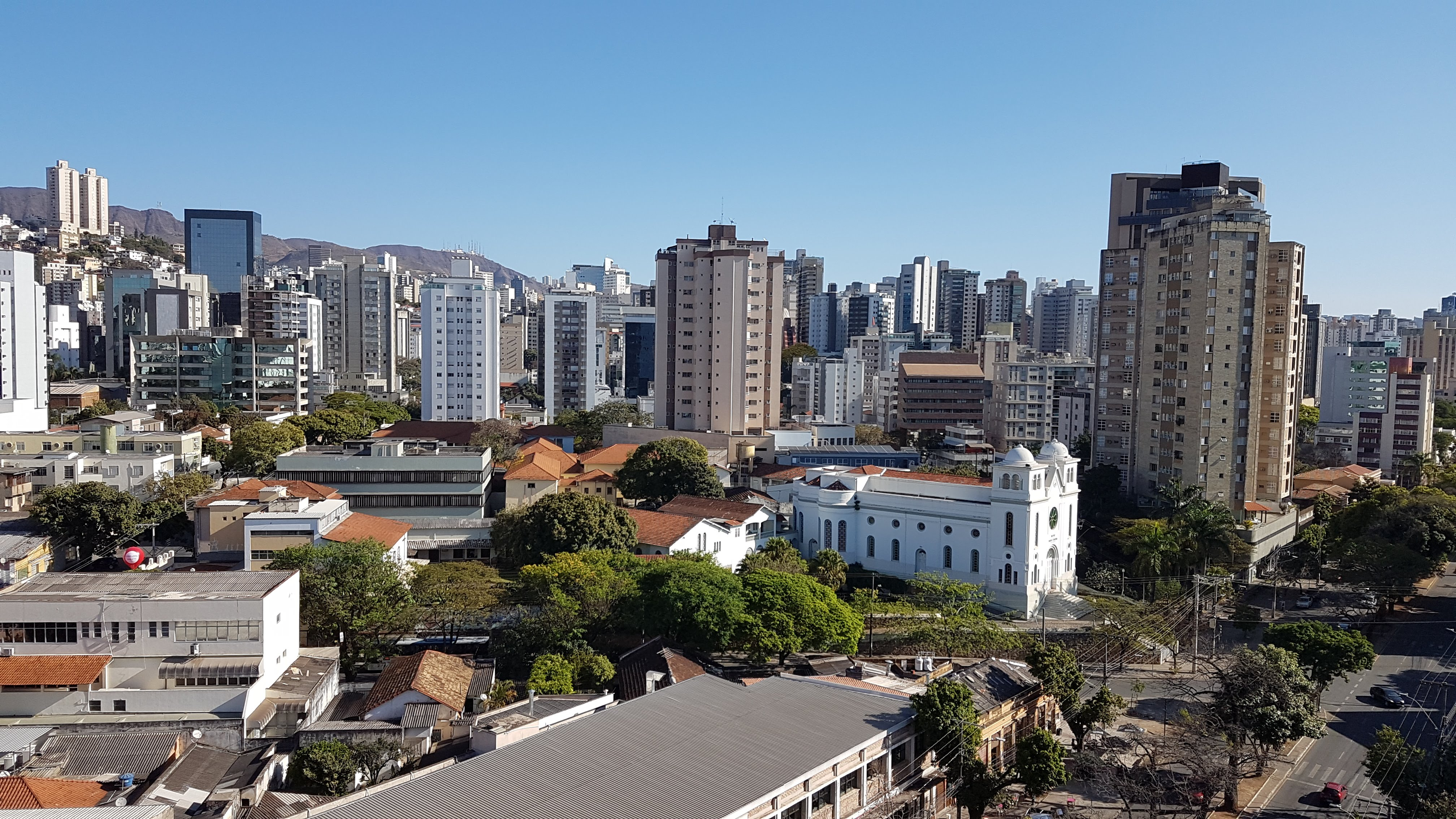
In Belo Horizonte, the former Italian agricultural colonies were incorporated into the city as neighborhoods. Today, little or nothing remains of the Italian past. The photo shows the neighborhood of Santa Efigênia today.

The presence of Italians in Belo Horizonte dates back to the beginning of the construction of the capital. The chief engineer of the Construction Commission of the New Capital, Francisco Bicalho, together with the state government, encouraged the arrival of immigrants to Belo Horizonte, starting in 1895. The project demanded many workers and immigration was the resource used by Bicalho to solve the labor problem. Housing for immigrants was built on the margins of the Arrudas Rive. Between January 1896 and May 1897, 1,543 individuals passed through the place. The immigrants came directly from Italy or were recruited at the Hospedaria Horta Barbosa, in Juiz de Fora.

The Italian immigration to the capital, therefore began with the attraction of Italian laborers for its construction and continued with the formation of the colonial zone composed of five colonies around the city. These colonies formed the "green belt" for the supply of the city, as foreseen by the Construction Commission of the New Capital. The colonies also served as a way to populate the surroundings of the city, as a solution to diversify the economy. The first colony, Barreiro, was created in 1895 but did not prosper and was deactivated in 1899. Another two colonies were created in 1896 and implemented in 1898: Carlos Prates and Córrego da Mata (later named Américo Werneck). The other three were created in 1899: Afonso Pena, Bias Fortes, and Adalberto Ferraz.

The population of the colonial zone, which in 1900 numbered 1,137 people, including Brazilians and immigrants (mostly Italians), was halved in 1904 (625 people), and grew again, reaching a population of 1,162 individuals in 1910. They formed a significant part of the population of Belo Horizonte since in 1900 13,000 people were living in the capital, 17,000 in 1905, and 40,000 in 1912. Thus, the percentage of the population of the colonial zone in the capital varied from 8% of all the inhabitants of the city in 1900, to 4% in 1905. Italians have always been the most numerous immigrant group in Belo Horizonte. In 1905, 75% of the foreigners in the city were of this nationality, and in 1920, 61%. Portuguese and Spanish came next. The most common nationality in the colonies was Brazilian: in 1903, nationals made up 47.5% of the inhabitants of the colonial zone, and in 1910, 45%. Next came Italians: 37.2% in 1903 and 39.4% in 1910.

In 1905, 13.8% of the population of Belo Horizonte was composed of foreigners, and 4% of the total population of the municipality was in the colonial zone. This shows that a large part of the capital's immigrant population lived outside the colonies. From this date on, the immigrant population began to decline, as the flow of foreigners into Minas Gerais was short and less significant than in other Brazilian states. Thus, by 1920, immigrants had shrunk to 8.1% of the capital's inhabitants, a total of 4.5 thousand individuals.

== Coffee farms ==
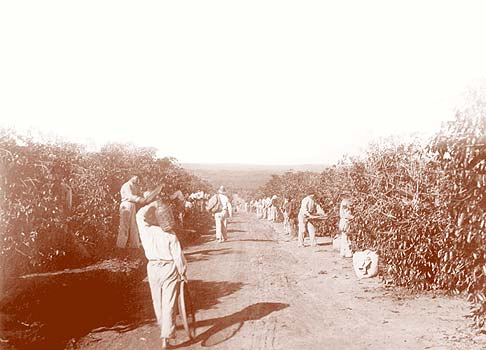
Most Italians went to Minas Gerais to work on coffee farms.

In Minas Gerais, many Italians began working in the harvest, bagging, and transporting of coffee and gradually moved into coffee production. In Minas Gerais, the system of sharecropping, paid in cash, predominated. According to this system, the immigrant kept half the value of the production, minus all the expenses with processing, transportation, sales commission, and taxes. The farmer paid the immigrant's salary usually for the execution of tasks related to coffee plantation: felling of the forest, burning, weeding, and planting; The sharecropping, however, was not very convenient for the immigrant, because the monetary income was low and it was only received after the sale of the harvest, minus all expenses. This system limited the economic and social mobility of the immigrant. In São Paulo, on the other hand, the colonato system predominated, which ensured the immigrant greater financial autonomy and mobility since it allowed the cultivation of foodstuffs among the coffee trees. As a consequence, the family did not have to divide itself between coffee and food cultivation, which increased its productivity and the earnings they obtained both in the coffee plantations and food crops. Therefore, it was more advantageous to immigrate to São Paulo than to Minas Gerais. According to the 1920 census, the average daily wage of a male hoe worker in Minas Gerais was 2$704 without food provided by the owner, and 1$833 with food. In São Paulo, the average wage was 3$944 and 2$814, respectively.

The work conditions on the Brazilian farms were generally very poor, as described in the early 20th century in the Bollettini dell'Emigrazione:

"The moral conditions of life continue to be sad and even worse the further inland you go [...] wage labor has preserved a set of uses that still go back to the time of slavery and that are difficult to make disappear. [...] The farmer finds natural the prohibition of the settlers to leave the farm without permission, or to receive acquaintances, ring the bell in the morning to wake up and at night to impose silence. They believe that this is necessary for reasons of discipline in the farm system, but these are uses which constitute such restrictions on individual liberty that the sacrifice of submitting to them is far from being compensated for by the low gains."

The immigrant was like a prisoner of the boss and the farm managers, deprived of any autonomy, and subjected to a heavy work rhythm, from "sunrise to sundown", with a brief break to eat. Some immigrants were even whipped by the farm's goons, a remnant of slavery. Certain jobs, such as sowing, for which it was necessary to prepare the land for the coffee plantation, required great physical endurance, even more difficult under the hot sun. These conditions were worse on the farms far from the populated centers and the railroads. There, the immigrant had to shop at the store run by the farmer himself, where the products were more expensive and often spoiled. Wage earnings were small and often only enough to eat, and it was not possible to save money, which was the immigrants' goal when they left Italy. The situation became much worse with the fall in the price of coffee on the international market, especially after 1896. In October 1890, the Italian newspaper Il Resto del Carlino published:

"We continue to receive from Brazil official communications from consuls and private letters from immigrants who agree to reveal the condition of misery in which our countrymen are. [...] Many laborers from our provinces who are there are in the most squalid misery, and they write to their relatives asking them to send them the money necessary to repatriate themselves."

Regret for having immigrated to Brazil was common among Italians because the terrible conditions in the new country were not what they expected to find when they left Italy; however, many of them had no money to return and sought help at the consulate or sent letters asking for help to relatives and friends in the land of origin. One of these letters has survived and was published in 2010 by Italian historian Lorenza Servetti: in January 1891, the Italian Luigi Franceschi, who had lived with his wife and five small children on the farm of a certain "doctor Iderado", in Ouro Fino, in southern Minas Gerais, begged, in a letter to the parish priest of Budrio, to help them leave: "these foreign lands, where we are killed by all kinds of insects." In the letter, the immigrant informs that he came to Brazil with the dream of "being able to accumulate in a few years a little money and then return to Italy," but he points out that this was impossible, because "for the income that is made, even if God wanted it, many years will pass before I can return with my family to the homeland". In another section of the letter, Luigi Franceschi pleads with the Italian priest for help:

"So I address your lordship and out of charity, I beg you by the viscera of Jesus and Mary to favor me and my poor family not only for the body but first of all for the soul because we are far from the Church, priests, and the doctor. Even if we wanted to go to confession, we need 30 lire, for baptism ₤15, and for a single visit to the doctor ₤62.50. [...] I believe that your dignity will do such a favor so that I can return, welcoming me as the father did the prodigal son. I end by greeting you and begging you out of charity not to abandon me and that you can prematurely get me out of this Siberia as my wife and children mourn the abandonment of our beaches, moreover if there are families from Vedrana who are willing to come to Brazil, stay at home that you will not regret it."

On the other hand, immigrants who were lucky enough to be hired by a more benevolent farmer and in more productive areas were able to save money, buy a piece of land for the family or return to Italy with some money. The ability to save money by working on coffee farms depended on several variables, such as the price of coffee on the international market; domestic inflation; family size (the more people, especially male, the greater the chances); land productivity; the existence of a nearby market to sell the surplus; getting paid on time; being free from fines; not having to spend on doctors and medicine, etc.

There is no consensus in the literature about the possibility that Italians were able to save money by working on coffee farms. Anthropologist Verena Stolcke divides the authors who have dealt with the subject into two groups: the pessimists and the optimists. The pessimists defend the thesis that it was practically impossible to save money as a settler and that immigrants abandoned the farms due to the exploitative conditions, the misery, and the impossibility of gathering enough money to buy land, denying or minimizing their achievements. In turn, the optimists claim that the work conditions were not so bad and that it was possible to accumulate wealth. However, these studies are focused on the state of São Paulo, where the service allocation and colonato systems predominated. In Minas Gerais, the sharecropping or partnership system predominated, which, according to the literature, was a much worse system than colonato and made it difficult for the immigrant to accumulate money.

=== Profile of the immigrant in Minas Gerais ===
The profile of the Italian immigrants did not differ much from the "Paulistan model". There was a predominance of subsidized immigration for farming, especially coffee farming, destined mainly to private farms and, in a minority, to colonial nuclei.

The Italian immigrant usually came to Minas Gerais accompanied by his family (with an average of 3 to 7 people). There was a slight predominance of men and single people (55.1%), followed by married ones (43.3%).

== Immigration to the urban centers ==
The spontaneous immigration of Italians to Minas Gerais preceded the subsidized immigration. Around 2,000 immigrants from southern Italy came to Minas Gerais between 1860 and 1887. They were mostly artisans - shoemakers, locksmiths, carpenters, master builders, and small traders - who settled in the urban centers. They came mainly from southern and central Italy, and had some level of education. These were not Italians who immigrated fleeing poverty, but individuals who arrived in Brazil with some resources, who set up commerce, workshops, and small factories in urban centers. However, this was not the case of the Italian immigrant in Minas Gerais, where subsidized and rural immigration predominated, contrary to what occurred, for example, in Rio de Janeiro, where spontaneous and urban Italian immigration predominated.

In 1920, about 30,000 Italian immigrants still worked as wage earners and sharecroppers on the coffee farms in Minas Gerais, but many were already in the urban centers. In 1890, 13,039 Italian immigrants resided in the thirteen largest inland cities of Minas Gerais. In 1920, the census recorded 23,669 Italians residing in these same urban centers, representing a 55% increase over 30 years.

The importance of immigrants in the initial phase of Brazilian industrialization can be explained by the fact that some of them already brought some experience in activities of this nature from their homeland. In addition, they brought a deeply-rooted work culture. In Minas Gerais, the presence of Italian immigrants was particularly strong in the mechanical sector. In Juiz de Fora, for example, immigrants provided skilled labor, which gave rise to the first manufacturers, the creation of commerce and workshops.

== Origins and destinations ==
=== Regions of origin ===
The Italian emigration to Brazil included people from several regions of Italy, and the same happened in Minas Gerais. Analyzing the immigrants who arrived in Leopoldina, in the Zona da Mata of Minas Gerais, it was discovered that they came from fourteen different regions of Italy: Lombardy, Friuli-Venezia Giulia, Veneto, Piedmont, Emilia-Romagna, Tuscany, Umbria, Marche, Abruzzo, Campania, Basilicata, Calabria, Sicily, and Sardinia.

With rare exceptions, the farmer from Minas Gerais did not like to receive people from Southern Italy, because, for the most part, they were not farmers. The Italians coming from the South were mostly laborers, and although they were important in the construction of the new capital Belo Horizonte, they were not well suited for agricultural work. With the establishment of the Superintendence, the Minas Gerais government started to recruit immigrants directly from Italy and suspended the participation of Southerners. This rule, however, was relaxed as of 1894, with the exclusive opening of immigration from Sardinia to Minas Gerais. Besides being good farmers, the Sardinians did not have kinship and friendship ties in other states of Brazil, a fact that restrained them from leaving the Minas Gerais territory.

Based on a survey that analyzed the 183 Italian personalities whose streets and squares were named after in Belo Horizonte, it was found that 18.03% originated from Veneto; Emilia-Romagna, Lazio, and Lombardy had 11.48% each; Campania and Tuscany 10.38% each; Calabria 9.29%, Piedmont 7.65%; Trentino 2.18%; Abruzzo, Marche, and Sicily 1.64% each; Basilicata and Puglia 1.09% each and Sardinia 0.55%. The data show the great diversity of the origins of Italian immigrants in Minas Gerais although, as in most of Brazil, Veneto emerged as the region with the largest presence.

The data on the provinces of origin of the immigrants who arrived in the city of São João del-Rei, in 1888, show that almost all of them were from Northern Italy, especially from Bologna, Ferrara, and Verona. Of the 639 immigrants that entered that year, 415 came from the Emilia-Romagna region (65% of the total). The rest came mainly from the Veneto region and a few from Lombardy and Calabria. Due to the supremacy of Emilians, the colonial nucleus later came to be known as the "Bologna - Ferrara colony."

Provinces of origin of immigrants entering São João del-Rei (1888)
Province	Numbers
Bologna (Emilia-Romagna)	203
Ferrara (Emilia-Romagna)	200
Verona (Veneto)	126
Rovigo (Veneto)	16
Ravenna (Emilia-Romagna)	12
Mantua (Lombardy)	12
Vincenza (Veneto)	8
Veneza (Veneto)	7
Cosenza (Calabria)	5
Total	639

At the end of the 19th century, Emilia-Romagna faced a serious financial crisis, with a high rate of rural unemployment. Many braccianti, how the landless peasants were called, who had to work in third-party properties, were left without work and started to live off government donations. It was at this time that the states of São Paulo and Minas Gerais went into action, with aggressive propaganda in the region to persuade the landless peasants to immigrate to Brazil and increase the number of workers for the coffee plantations. With some regions of Bologna, Minas Gerais even managed to overtake São Paulo and attract more immigrants, such as from the Valle dell'Idice region. The free ship ticket and promises of earning wages three times higher than in Italy and being able to become landowners served as a motivation for those people.

The Italian region that directed its migratory flow preferentially to Minas Gerais was the island of Sardinia. This region contributed very little to immigration to Brazil, except in 1896 and 1897, when 5,200 people left the island. This occurred after immigration agents systematically traveled the region, since there were increasing complaints against subsidized emigration to the mainland and the isolation of the island contributed to a lesser awareness of these complaints, facilitating the recruitment of immigrants.

Italian Immigration to Brazil (1876-1920)
Region of origin	Number of immigrants	Region of origin	Number of immigrants
Veneto	365,710	Sicily	44,390
Campania	166,080	Piedmont	40,336
Calabria	113,155	Apulia	34,833
Lombardy	105,973	Marche	25,074
Tuscany	81,056	Umbria	11,818
Emilia-Romagna	59,877	Liguria	9,328
Basilicata	52,888	Sardinia	6,113
Total: 1,243,633

== Ethnic Identity ==
=== Endogamy ===
Data on Italian marriages in Belo Horizonte show that, initially, levels of endogamy were high in this community, with a high tendency for Italians to marry each other. At the end of the 19th century and the beginning of the 20th century, 74% of the fiancés and 95% of the fiancées married people born in Italy. This trend, however, dissipated over the years. Two decades later, only 20% of the grooms and 62% of the brides were married to fellow citizens. The data show that from the beginning, the Italian community in Belo Horizonte was relatively open to marriages with Brazilians or with non-Italian immigrants, a trend that became wider as the years went by. The urban environment contributed to this, since in the cities immigrants were less likely to close themselves within their ethnic group. Moreover, the arrival of new immigrants dropped dramatically at the very beginning of the twentieth century, decreasing the opportunities for marriage with other Italians, which also contributed to the lower incidence of inbreeding.

=== Assimilation of the Italians into the Minas Gerais society ===
The diversity in the immigrants' geographical origins was reflected in the very ethnic identity they had. One cannot speak of an Italian ethnic group in Brazil at the beginning of the immigration era, because Italy was a newly unified state. The immigrants themselves, as soon as they arrived in Brazil, tended to identify themselves more as people from a certain Italian region than as Italians. The lower classes took little part in the unification process of the country in the late nineteenth century, and their group consciousness did not go beyond the area in which they lived. They were "Venetians," "Calabrians," "Sicilians," or "Lombards" before they were "Italians."

Brazilians, however, were unaware of these regional differences in Italy and made no distinctions between Italians. Therefore, when they arrived in Brazil, immigrants still tended to identify themselves as belonging to a regional group in the Italian Peninsula, but through contact with Brazilians, who did not distinguish these groups and treated everyone as being only Italian, the regional identity was weakened, being replaced by an Italian national identity.

The assimilation of the Italian immigrants occurred naturally, quickly, and massively. Italian associations were created in Minas Gerais, but they had few members. In 1908, there were only 1,442 members in the twenty-four Italian associations in the state. This low number can be explained by the high degree of assimilation, the absence of a defined Italian identity, the high monthly fees, and the immigrants' lack of time and interest in participating. At that time, many Italians could not even speak the standard Italian language, but only regional dialects, many of which were incomprehensible to each other. As a result, once in Brazil, it was easier (and more useful) to learn Portuguese than to devote oneself to learning Italian. This also explains the short-lived newspapers of the Italian community, as many of the immigrants were illiterate or did not master standard Italian.

In Minas Gerais, the formation of closed Italian colonies did not occur. The immigrants did not isolate themselves from the Brazilians, as happened in some places in the southern region of Brazil, where they tended to preserve the language and customs of their country of origin. In Minas Gerais, the Italians ended up assimilating the Brazilian culture, in general, and the Minas Gerais culture, in particular. According to Norma de Góes Monteiro, "The first generation, the children born in Minas [Gerais], are no longer distinguished at all from those who are of the land and children and grandchildren of Minas Gerais natives."

Currently, Minas Gerais inhabitants of Italian descent no longer carry, besides their surname, any characteristics that particularly identify them with Italy, even though some individuals still retain, in the family environment, certain customs and values that are remembered and celebrated as ancestor worship. Some have acquired Italian citizenship, based on the principle of jus sanguinis.

== See also ==
- Italian Brazilians
- Italian immigration in Rio Grande do Sul
