= Antônio Carlos Biscaia =

Brazilian politician

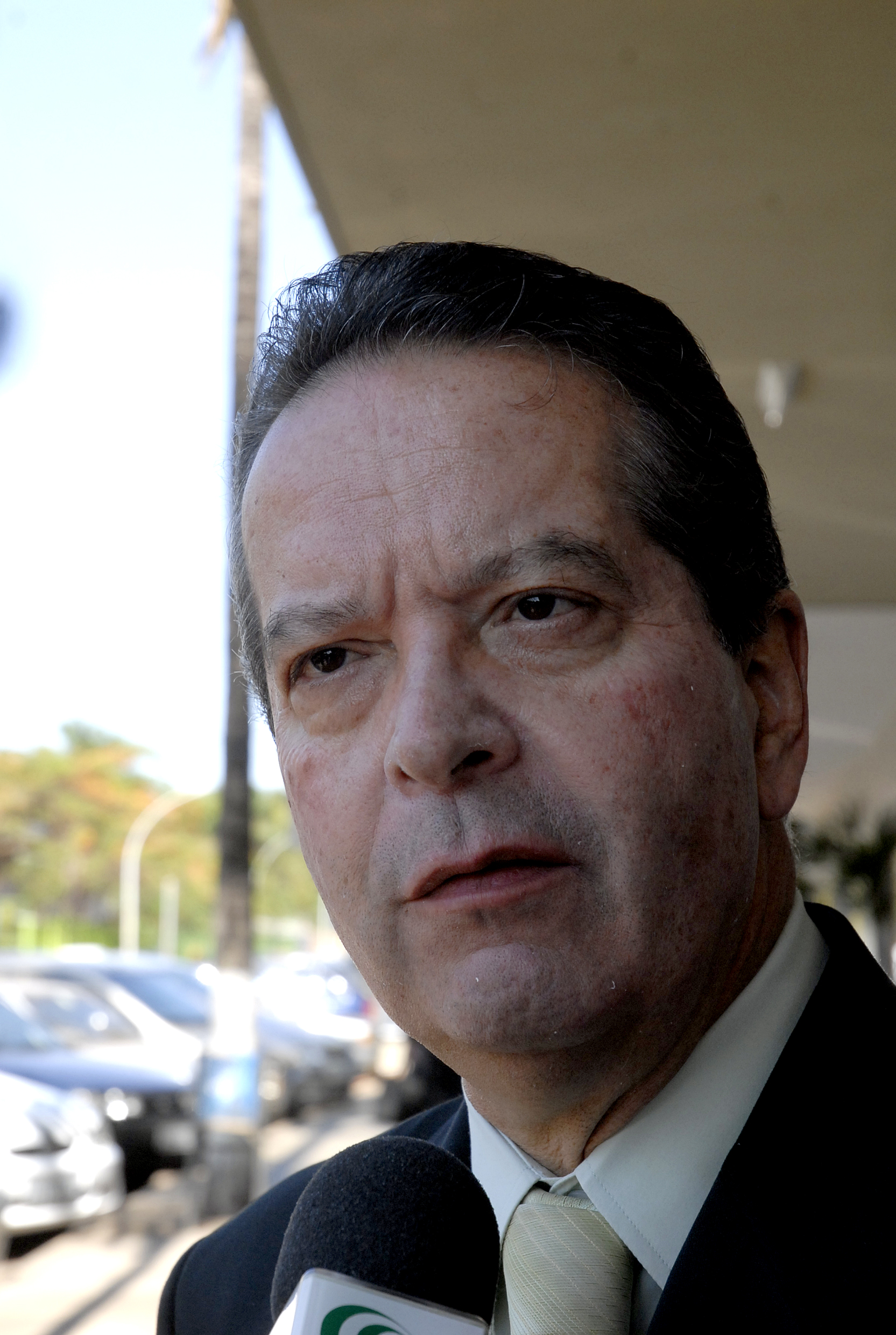
Antônio Carlos Biscaia Foto:Antonio Cruz/ABr

Antônio Carlos Silva Biscaia (born June 13, 1942, in Curitiba, Paraná) is former federal prosecutor and currently a politician from Brazil. He is affiliated to the Partido dos Trabalhadores (PT - Workers Party). He is a Professor of Criminal Procedural Law of the Universidade Cândido Mendes (UCAM).

== Federal prosecutor ==
Biscaia became known in the early 1990s as an uncorruptabe federal prosecutor taking on the bicheiros, the operators of the jogo do bicho ("the animals' game"), a popular illegal lottery in Rio de Janeiro. The illegal lottery operators built a mafia-type association (known as the cupola do bicho), that controlled the illegal gambling business and shielded it from prosecution by corrupting authorities and police.

In 1994, he oversaw a raid on the headquarters of the illegal lottery boss Castor de Andrade and discovered a log book registering regular bribes from the bicheiros to more than 100 people, including police officers, the judiciary and politicians, such as the former President of Brazil, Fernando Collor de Mello.

== In politics ==
Biscaia was a Federal Deputy for the Workers' Party (PT) in the periods 1999-2000, 2003–2007 and 2008-2010. He has been National Secretary of Justice and the Secretary for National Public Security (Secretaria Nacional de Segurança Pública - SENASP) from 2007-2008.

On September 29, 2009, Biscaia sponsored a new law in the Brazilian Congress, known as Ficha Limpa – meaning ‘clean slate’ in English. The law aims to permanently bar any person from running for any political office (in municipal, state or federal elections) who has any corruption charges or allegations pending against them. The law was a popular initiative by Movement to Combat Electoral Corruption (MCCE), an umbrella group consisting of over 43 like-minded organisations, but officially it will be recorded on his name. On June 4, 2010, the bill was signed and became law.

== Bibliography ==
- New Approaches to Public Security and Drug Policy, Presentation at the International Symposium on Public Security and Drug Policy, Rio de Janeiro, February 25–27, 2008
