= Bingo (card game) =

Card game

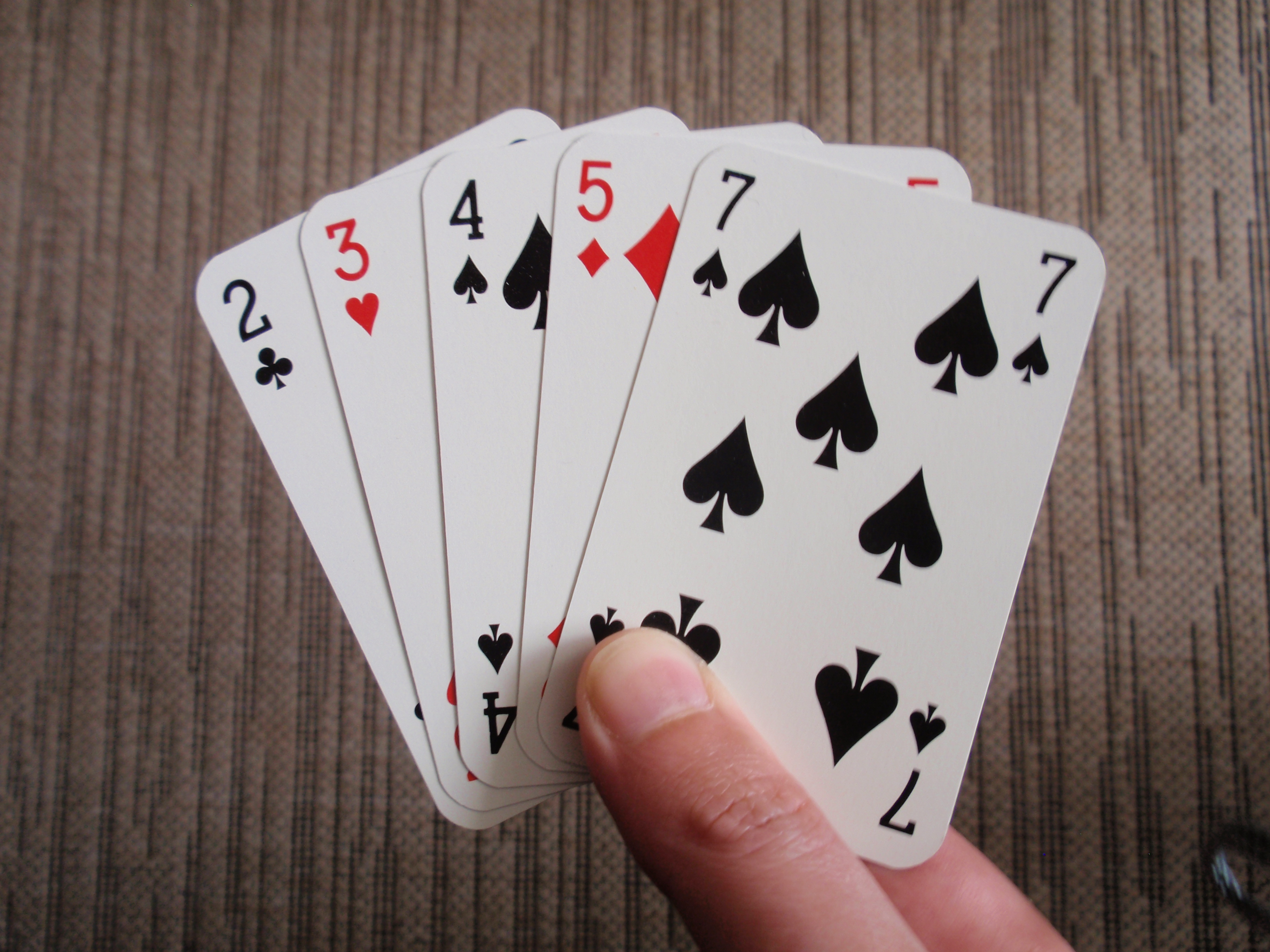
- Players are dealt hands of typically five cards.
- Cards: 52
- Deck: French
- Chance: High

Bingo (also bango) is a card game named by analogy to the game bingo. The game is played with a bridge deck of 52 cards.

== Rules ==
The dealer gives each player a number of cards (typically five), which are held in the hand or placed face-down in front of the player. The dealer places the same number of cards face-down in the center of the table.

A round of play consists of betting, followed by the dealer turning over one of the center cards, so that it is facing-up. Any card in a player's hand that has the same rank value as the rank of the center card just turned are now revealed and discarded. The discards can be placed face-up in front of the player.

Betting rounds continue until a player has all of the cards knocked from their hand. In analogy to regular bingo, the first player to realize their hand is empty says "bingo" and claims the pot. If no player is knocked out after all the center cards have been revealed, then all of the players reveal their remaining cards. A winner can be determined by adding the rank values of cards remaining in the hand.

In determining value, jacks are valued at 11, queens, at 12, kings at 13, and aces at either 1 or 15, depending on whether the players have agreed that high rank wins or low rank wins. The game can also be played with cards having blackjack value, with all face cards given value of 10 and the ace having value of either 1 or 11.

== Variations ==
In "Sixty Six Bingo" each player gets six cards and there are six common cards. Instead of betting each round, there are betting rounds before any common cards are turned over, after the first two cards are turned over, after the third and fourth cards are turned over and after the fifth and sixth cards are turned over. If no player claims the pot by being knocked out, then the pot is split between high hand and low hand. If a player's remaining cards include an ace, then it is possible to be both high hand and low hand.

Another variation gives each player five cards face down, and ten common cards are to be placed in the center of the table, face down. The dealer will turn over the first common card and call it out. If a player has the same rank in their hand, they will then discard. The dealer will continue to call out each card until all of the common cards have been turned face up. The player that is able to discard all five cards, calls bingo and wins the hand.

== See also ==
- Road trip bingo
