= Denise Frossard =

Brazilian politician

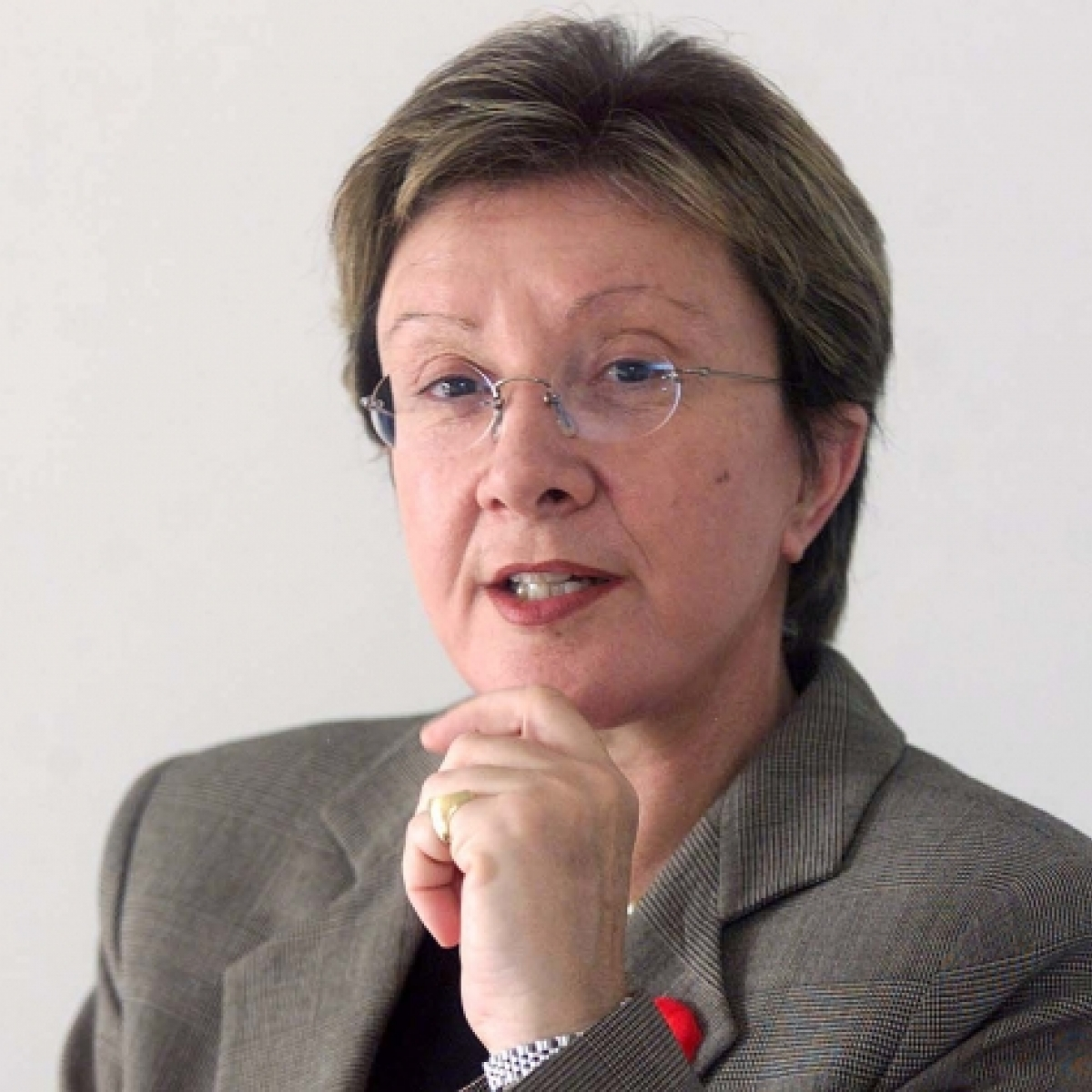
- Former judge and former congresswoman, Denise Frossard

Member of the Chamber of Deputies
- In office 1 February 2003 – 31 January 2007
- Constituency: Rio de Janeiro

Personal details
- Born: 6 October 1950 (age 75) Carangola
- Party: PPS (1994–2001); PSDB (2001-2004); Cidadania (2004-present)
- Education: Pontifical Catholic University of Rio de Janeiro

Denise Frossard Loschi (Carangola, October 6, 1950) is a judge and politician from Brazil. She studied law and served as a magistrate in Rio de Janeiro. She has been a law professor at the Getúlio Vargas Foundation. When she retired she started working for Transparency International.

== Career ==
Frossard was born in Carangola, Minas Gerais. Her parents, José de Araújo Loschi and Maria de Lourdes Gomes Frossard, were from the Zona da Mata region in the state of Minas Gerais. Her paternal grandfather, Oreste Loschi, was an Italian immigrant born into a farming family in the commune of Carpi (province of Modena). On her maternal side, Denise is also descended from French-speaking Swiss who first settled in Nova Friburgo. She graduated in Law from the Pontifical Catholic University of Rio de Janeiro (PUC-RJ) in 1976, and worked as a lawyer from 1977 to 1984 and as a judge in the State of Rio de Janeiro from 1984 to 1998.

She was the trial judge who on May 14, 1993, convicted 14 racketeers who control the lucrative Jogo do Bicho (the “animal game” – an illegal but popular numbers gamble) in Rio de Janeiro. The so-called bicheiros were a notorious source of corruption of police officers, politicians, part of the media and even social organisations such as the samba schools, that organise Rio's world-famous Carnival parades, a huge source of tourist income to both the city and the state). Frossard sentenced them to six years' imprisonment. The sentence recognized the existence of a mafia-type organization in Brazil for the first time. Editorial pages of Brazilian newspapers praised Frossard's courage to take on the illegal lottery bosses.

"The animal game is a deeply embedded cultural phenomenon with a certain romantic aura, and thus hard to eradicate," according to Frossard. "But it is also a quintessentially Brazilian way of laundering money and contributes greatly to the problem of impunity in this country." Judge Frossard was subjected to pressures from both the political establishment and the Judiciary itself and her life has been threatened. She has been the target of assassination attempts that she attributes to hired guns in the pay of game kingpins. A former military policeman allegedly received an offer of US$270,000 (R$1 million) to kill Frossard, but was arrested before he could commit the murder.

After the judgment in 1993, she spent a year in the United States, returning to head the Brazilian branches of Transparency International and the Women's Bank. In 1998, she could have been promoted to desembargador (appellate judge), but opted for politics instead. She tried for the Senate and received 635,000 votes, but lost to Saturnino Braga.

In 2002, she was elected as federal representative for the Socialist People's Party (Partido Popular Socialista, PPS) to the Chamber of Deputies. She won the election in the State of Rio de Janeiro with a landslide, winning more votes in that election than any of her colleagues. Her term ended in 2006, after which she ran for governor of the State of Rio de Janeiro. With 32% of the valid votes, she lost in the run-off from Sérgio Cabral Filho, the candidate for the Brazilian Democratic Movement Party (Partido do Movimento Democrático Brasileiro, PMDB), who won 68% of the votes.

In 2005 she received the Medalha Tiradentes by the Legislative Assembly of the State of Rio de Janeiro, for relevant services offered to the State of Rio de Janeiro.

== Sources ==
- Frossard, Denise (2007), "Women in Organized Crime in Brazil", in Fiandaca, Giovanni (ed.), Women and the Mafia, New York: Springer, pp. 181–204, ISBN 978-0-387-36537-4
