= Vasil Bozhkov =

Bulgarian businessman (born 1956)

- Васил Божков
- Born: July 29, 1956 (age 70); Velingrad, PR Bulgaria
- Citizenship: Bulgaria
- Education: Sofia University
- Occupation: Businessman

Vasil Krumov Bozhkov (Bulgarian: Васил Крумов Божков; born July 29, 1956) is a Bulgarian politician and a businessman, once considered the richest Bulgarian with a fortune estimated at between 1 and 3 billion Bulgarian levs.

Known by the nickname The Skull (Черепа, Cherepa), in internal correspondence of the US State Department he was described as "the most infamous gangster in Bulgaria." In January 2020, Bozhkov left Bulgaria and fled to Dubai to avoid arrest. He was charged with a number of crimes, including murder, money laundering, tax evasion, rape, and more.

== Education ==
Bozhkov graduated from the National Mathematical High School in Sofia. He has two higher educations – specialty "Applied Mathematics" at Sofia University and "Labor Economics" at the University of National and World Economy.

== Business career ==
Bozhkov started his business in 1989 near the Magura confectionery in Sofia, where currencies, antiques and weapons were illegally sold. He soon opened a chain of exchange offices. In 1991 he registered his main company Nove Holding, in which he is the largest shareholder and since 2005 – chairman of the board of directors. In 1991, Bozhkov became a partner with Iliya Pavlov and Mladen Mihalev-Majo in the gambling company IGM. He opened a casino in the Rila Hotel in Sofia. As of 2007, he co-owned the casinos at Radisson SAS and Hemus and the bingo halls. In 1994, Bozhkov opened the Bulgarian Commercial Industrial Bank (BTIB), which in 1996–1997 merged with Credit Group of Multigroup. In 2000, he bought the assets of the bankrupt First Private Bank. In 2006, Bozhkov bought the former HD Roads privatization fund through the stock exchange. The main shareholder in Holding Roads is ABV Engineering, which is owned by Nove International (a subsidiary of Nove Holding). Through Holding Roads, Bozhkov bought a large part of the regional state road construction companies, which were previously owned by the General Directorate of Roads.

At the end of 2007, when allocating the surplus of the national budget and expressing doubts about the objectivity of the distribution, Vasil Bozhkov's companies took 47.7 million levs from the money allocated under the Republican Road Infrastructure Fund.

In 2006, the Polish magazine Wprost estimated Bozhkov's fortune at $1 billion, in 2007 at $1.5 billion, and in 2008 at $1.35 billion.

He has been a member of the Confederation of Large Industrialists and of the Bulgarian Business Club "Vazrazhdane" since the founding of each of the two associations in 1993 and 2001.

== The Collection ==
In 2004 Bozhkov established the Thrace Foundation with the official goal of "organizing and supporting the search for and preservation of cultural values, part of the Bulgarian and world cultural and historical heritage". Its executive director is Kiril Hristoskov. The foundation is mainly engaged in exhibiting and promulgating antiquities owned by Bozhkov, but has also financed archaeological excavations in 2005–2007.

Bozhkov owns a collection of antiques, which historian Bozhidar Dimitrov claims were exported from Bulgaria before 1911 and purchased abroad. In 2005 the collection was described by Ivan Marazov. Part of it is exhibited in Brussels (2006) and Moscow (2009). In 2011 the National History Museum hosted the exhibition "Thrace and the Ancient World XV-I century BC. – Vasil Bozhkov Collection ", containing 230 monuments of Thracian and Greco-Roman art. As a collector, Bozhkov declared himself against the Cultural Heritage Act adopted in 2009.

== Participation in the sports industry ==
In 1993, Bozhkov founded the sports betting agency Eurofootball, which since 2002 has included Greek billionaire Sokratis Kokkalis as a partner with his company Intralot. In 2000 Bozhkov was elected chairman of the Bulgarian Shooting Federation, and in 2003 he headed the Bulgarian Chess Federation. In 1999 he bought PFC CSKA AD, which he subsequently sold to Pramod Mittal (4 December 2006). In 2009, he declared footballers "modern gladiators". In February 2019, with a special press release from the company "Nove Holding" Bozhkov announced that he had become the owner of PFC Levski Sofia and would take care of its management, financing and long-term development. The businessman claims that for a period of one year he has invested nearly 25 million Bulgarian levs in the club. On 2 June 2020, he transferred the entire stake to football legend Nasko Sirakov.

== Controversies ==
=== Abuses of the legal system ===
The financial circles and the press have expressed doubts that Bozhkov is manipulating the minority owners by draining Nove Holding by taking out non-public subsidiaries and bonuses for himself. On 5 January 2009, the General Meeting of Holding Roads voted for Bozhkov an additional remuneration of 3.84 million levs. The Financial Supervision Commission does not report any irregularities.

=== Links to organized crime ===
Bozhkov is suspected of having close ties to the SIC group, a Bulgarian organized crime group. He is considered a co-owner of the Bull Ins insurance company, although the nominal owners are offshore companies and the connection is unprovable. Bull Ins took over the SIC's "insurance" structures after they did not receive a license in 1998.

Bozhkov's name is mentioned in the WikiLeaks correspondence leaked to the US Embassy in Bulgaria. Together with Todor Batkov, Grisha Ganchev and the brothers Krasimir and Nikolay Marinov, leaders of the SIC crime group, Bozhkov was given as an example "of some of the most famous connections" of Bulgarian business with organized crime.

Again, according to information leaked through WikiLeaks, in 2009 the acting US ambassador to Bulgaria John Ordwick in a diplomatic letter identified Bozhkov as "the most infamous gangster" and found that Bozhkov was still active "in money laundering, in privatization fraud, threats, extortion, racketeering and the illegal trade in antiques."

=== Suspected criminal activity ===
20 charges were filed against Bozhkov, in three cases, including extortion and attempted bribery. Bozhkov had been living in self imposed exile in Dubai since January 2020, until he returned to Bulgaria in August 2023, whereupon he was detained.

In March, 2022 Tsvetomir Naydenov and Boyan Naydenov, former business partners of Bozhkov, mentioned in an interview that he had confessed to them that he had ordered the murder of Bulgarian businessman Manol Velev, who was shot in 2006 and remained in a coma until his death on March 25, 2022.

=== Boyko Borissov ===
Bozhkov asked in 2023 to be allowed to return to Bulgaria as a protected witness against ex-prime minister Boyko Borissov, who he says received money from Bozhkov.

== Sanctions ==
On 10 February 2023 the United Kingdom HM Treasury imposed sanctions, considering Bozhkov an involved person under the Global Anti-Corruption Sanctions Regulations, involved in serious corruption.

== Politics ==
On 8 June 2020, Bozhkov announced from his rented apartment in Dubai that he had plans to enter politics after returning to Bulgaria. He commented: “We need a new political project. Power must be seized from Borisov." He also created a Facebook poll asking his followers whether they would follow him in a political project.

This led to the creation of a new party called Bulgarian Summer, registered on 4 January 2021. It calls for the implementation of a Direct democracy. Its slogan is “Justice for all”. The party received 94,515 votes (2.91%, near the 4% threshold) in the April 2021 Bulgarian parliamentary election, which were inconclusive and led to a do-over in July, during which his party received about 1.80%.

While under house arrest, on 21 February 2024, Vasil Bozhkov announced the formation of a new political party which was to be called "CENTER". He was chosen as the list-leader for the coalition "Center" for the 2024 European Parliament Elections.

== Personal life ==
Vasil Bozhkov married Maya Angelova Bozhkova in 1980, they had a single child, born in 1986, named Anton Bozhkov. According to many reports, Maya has been living in the United Kingdom for years. For a long period, their son Anton also lived in the UK where he graduated from the University of Cambridge and the Imperial College London. Anton Bozhkov is married to Iva Sofianska, daughter of former Sofia's three-term mayor and former interim Prime Minister of Bulgaria. Anton and Iva gave Vasil Bozhkov 3 grandchildren.

Vasil Bozhkov is currently in a relationship with Elena Dineva, who is 13 years younger than him. Dineva is well-known among the Bulgarian elite.

== In fiction ==
The prototype of one of the characters in Lyudmila Filipova's first novel – "Anatomy of Illusions", Boris Bukov, is Vasil Bozhkov.
