= Zhan Videnov =

Former Prime Minister of Bulgaria

- Жан Виденов
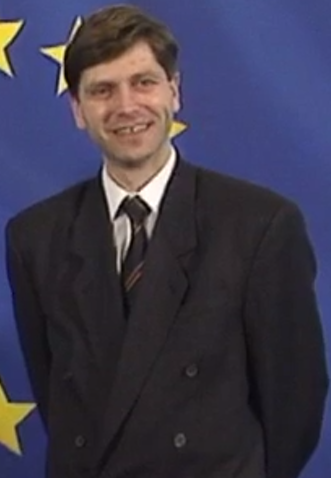
- Videnov in 1995

Prime Minister of Bulgaria
- In office 25 January 1995 – 13 February 1997
- President: Zhelyu Zhelev; Petar Stoyanov
- Deputy: Rumen Gechev; Kiril Tsochev; Svetoslav Shivarov; Doncho Konakchiev
- Preceded by: Reneta Indzhova
- Succeeded by: Stefan Sofiyanski

Leader of the Bulgarian Socialist Party
- In office 12 December 1991 – 21 December 1996
- Preceded by: Alexander Lilov
- Succeeded by: Georgi Parvanov

Member of the National Assembly
- In office 4 November 1991 – 25 January 1995

Member of the 7th Grand National Assembly
- In office 10 July 1990 – 2 October 1991
- Preceded by: Position established
- Succeeded by: Position abolished

Personal details
- Born: Zhan Vasilev Videnov; 22 March 1959 (age 67) Plovdiv, PR Bulgaria
- Party: BSP (1990–2009)
- Other political affiliations: BKP (until 1990); Left Alliance for a Clean and Holy Republic (2021)
- Spouse: Katalina Videnova
- Education: Moscow State Institute of International Relations
- Occupation: Politician

Zhan Vasilev Videnov (Bulgarian: Жан Василев Виденов [ˈʒan ˈvidɛnof]; born 22 March 1959), sometimes spelled in English as Jean Videnov, was Prime Minister of Bulgaria from 25 January 1995 until 13 February 1997, a term remembered for the most severe economic and financial crisis in recent Bulgarian history, which featured hyperinflation and a drastic fall in living standards. He was chairman of the Bulgarian Socialist Party (BSP) from 1991 to 1996. Currently he is a college lecturer and inspirer of Che Guevara of Plovdiv.

== Early years ==
Zhan Videnov was born 22 March 1959 in Plovdiv. He graduated from the Plovdiv English Language School (ELS). He subsequently graduated in Foreign Economic Relations from the Moscow State Institute of International Relations.

== Term in office ==
Despite promises of change, the stagnation that had characterized the entire post-communist period since 1989 persisted during Videnov's term, as did the shady privatization schemes, the underfunding of social services, government inaction against organized crime groups such as VIS-2, SIC and Multigroup, alleged government patronizing of dingy business groups (such as the so-called "Orion friend circle") and the emigration of young and educated Bulgarians. Despite this, the BSP still had popular support for a time, as it was able to win the local elections in 1995. One significant initiative was the government's launching of a campaign for mass privatization, in which ordinary middle-class citizens were to acquire shares in the factories and firms that were being de-nationalized.

== Crisis ==
During the second year of Videnov's term, Bulgaria experienced a severe economic crisis and declining quality of living standard. One element of this was the grain crisis. In mid-1996, the first reports appeared that the country's grain reserves were near complete depletion due to excessive exports, and bread did actually become scarce for some time in the winter of 1996–1997. At the same time, the postponement of the payment of interest on Bulgaria's foreign debt, which had been negotiated by the Filip Dimitrov government (Union of Democratic Forces, UDF) in 1992, ran out and no further postponement was granted despite Bulgaria's continuing inability to pay. The government also failed to negotiate a loan to relieve the situation. This decreased the country's credit rating and initiated the destabilization of the finance system. In a short period of time, more than half of Bulgaria's commercial banks went bankrupt, with hundreds of thousands of people losing their savings, while the so-called "credit millionaires" profited enormously from the situation because their immense debts to the banks were reduced to nothing. Simultaneously, inflation skyrocketed, with the lev's value plummeting from 70:1 USD in early 1996 to 3,000:1 in early 1997, causing a sharp decline in purchasing power. According to the Bulgaria-based Institute for Market Economics, the hyperinflation was caused by the government's inept finance policy. Videnov himself blamed the Bulgarian National Bank's incompetent actions, and abuses committed during the previous coalition government headed by Lyuben Berov. Despite its initial refusal in order to save its reputation during the presidential elections campaign in 1996, the government was forced by the crisis to accept eventually the currency board proposed by the International Monetary Fund, a decision that was officially implemented by the next government in July 1997.

== Fall from power ==
The BSP lost the November 1996 presidential election by an almost 20% margin in the runoff between their candidate Ivan Marazov and the UDF's candidate Petar Stoyanov. Following the results, several chief members of cabinet resigned and joined the internal BSP opposition against the party leader. Videnov tendered his own resignation as both prime minister and chairman of the BSP on 21 December 1996, but stayed on as acting prime minister until a successor could be appointed. The BSP, which still held the majority in Parliament, attempted to form a new cabinet. However, the UDF-headed opposition responded by organizing month-long street protests in big cities, demanding that the parliament should be dissolved and that elections must be held immediately because of the BSP's responsibility for the crisis. The protests culminated in a general strike and a siege of the house of Parliament, which was stormed and set on fire by the protesters on 10 January 1997. Bowing to popular pressure, BSP leaders eventually agreed to early elections and a caretaker cabinet headed by Stefan Sofiyanski (UDF) took over on 13 February 1997. Videnov stayed for a brief period as a figure in the hardline opposition within BSP and as a low-ranking functionary, but he soon left politics altogether.

== Subtle political affairs ==
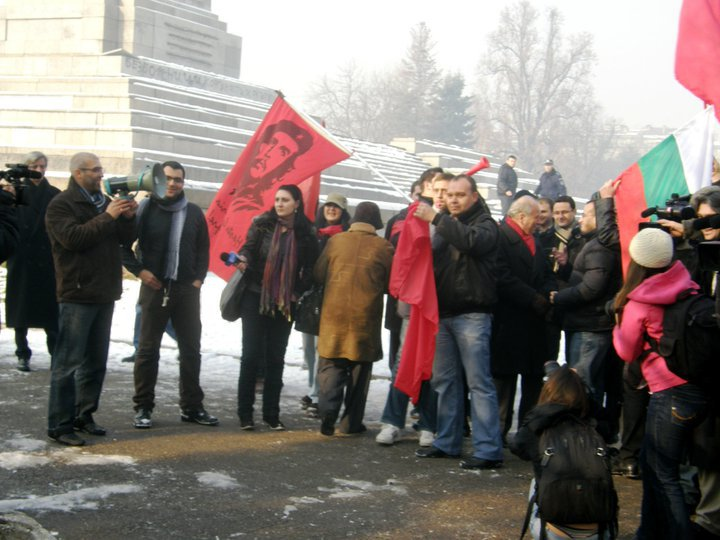
The Plovdiv movement Che Guevara protesting for the keeping of the Monument to the Soviet Army, Sofia in 2011, later Che Guevara movement took part in the February 2013 protests

Despite the widespread corruption and swindles of his time, Videnov was commonly said to have been a personally honest man whose naivety was misused by his own associates. This assessment was supported with the argument that, unusually for Bulgaria, he apparently didn't make any personal profit from his position and indeed left politics as poor as he had entered it.

In 2007, it was disclosed that he had collaborated with the Communist Bulgaria's secret service from 1988 to 1990 as a keeper of a secret meeting-place for agents.

In May 2021, after being absent for more than 20 years from the political scene in Bulgaria, Videnov announced that he is in the process of making his own political party - The Left Alternative (Лявата алтернатива, Lyavata alternativa) and that he will participate in the July 2021 parliamentary elections in a coalition with other left parties and organizations. His motives were that after the April 2021 Bulgarian parliamentary elections which ousted the 11-year rule of GERB there were bigger chances for a political change in Bulgaria. Eventually he joined the Left Union for a Clean and Holy Republic which failed to reach the threshold.

== Personal life ==
Zhan Videnov is married and has one son. He speaks English, French, Russian and Arabic. He presently teaches European integration at the private European College of Economics and Management in Plovdiv.

Political offices
Preceded by Reneta Indzhova	Prime Minister of Bulgaria; 1995-1997	Succeeded by Stefan Sofiyanski
