= Iliev =

Iliev (Bulgarian: Илиев), feminine Ilieva (Bulgarian: Илиева) is a Bulgarian surname derived from the personal name Iliya and may refer to:

- Borislav Iliev (born 1988), Bulgarian footballer
- Boyan Iliev (born 1982), Bulgarian footballer
- Dejan Iliev (born 1995), Macedonian footballer
- Dimitar Iliev (footballer born 1986), Bulgarian footballer
- Dimitar Iliev (footballer born 1988), Bulgarian footballer
- Dimitar Iliev Popov (1927–2015), leading Bulgarian judge and Prime Minister of Bulgaria
- Georgi Iliev (businessman) (1966–2005), Bulgarian businessman
- Georgi Iliev (footballer, born 1981), Bulgarian footballer
- Georgi Iliev (footballer, born 1956), Bulgarian footballer and manager
- Georgi Iliev (ice hockey) (born 1948), Bulgarian ice hockey player
- Hristo Iliev (volleyball) (born 1951), Bulgarian former volleyball player
- Ilian Iliev (born 1968), Bulgarian footballer and manager
- Iliana Ilieva (born 1966), Bulgarian rhythmic gymnast
- Iliya Iliev (born 1974), Bulgarian footballer
- Iliyan Iliev, Bulgarian footballer
- Ivan Iliev (disambiguation), several people
- Ivelina Ilieva, Bulgarian judoka
- Ivica Iliev (born 1979), Serbian footballer
- Katya Ilieva, Bulgarian athlete
- Maria Ilieva, Bulgarian singer
- Marieta Ilieva, Bulgarian gymnast
- Nikola Iliev (born 2004), Bulgarian footballer
- Nikolay Iliev (born 1964), Bulgarian footballer
- Peter Iliev (born 1984), Bulgarian luger who has competed since 2000
- Plamen Iliev (disambiguation), several people
- lamen Iliev (footballer, born 1991)
- Sachko Iliev, Bulgarian sprint canoeist who competed in the late 1960s and early 1970s
- Stefan Iliev, Bulgarian sprint canoeist who competed in the 1970s
- Strati Iliev (born 1974), Bulgarian footballer
- Tsvetan Iliev (born 1990), Bulgarian footballer
- Tsvetanka Ilieva, Bulgarian athlete
- Valentin Iliev (born 1980), Bulgarian footballer
- Valentina Ilieva, Bulgarian volleyball player
- Vasil Iliev, Bulgarian mobster, businessman and wrestler
- Vaska Ilieva, Macedonian folk singer
- Zdravko Iliev (born 1984), Bulgarian footballer
- Zhaneta Ilieva, Bulgarian gymnast

== See also ==
- Iliev Glacier, the 5 km long and 1.5 km wide glacier in Lassus Mountains on Alexander Island, Antarctica
- Aliyev
