= Gligorov =

Gligorov (Macedonian: Глигоров, Macedonian pronunciation: [ˈɡliɡɔrɔf]) is a Macedonian surname. Notable people with this surname include:

- Filip Gligorov (born 1993), Macedonian football player
- Gligor Gligorov (born 1987), Macedonian football player
- Kiro Gligorov (1917–2012), Macedonian and Yugoslav politician
- Nikola Gligorov (born 1983), Macedonian football player
- Vladimir Gligorov (1945–2022), Macedonian and Yugoslav economist
