= Ivan Iliev =

Ivan Iliev may refer to:

- Yvan Ylieff (Ivan Iliev, born 1941), Belgian politician
- Ivan Iliev (wrestler) (born 1946), Bulgarian wrestler
- Ivan Iliev (footballer) (born 1955), Bulgarian footballer
- Ivan Iliev (judoka) (born 1985), Bulgarian judoka

== See also ==
- Iliev
