= Konstantin "Samokovetsa" Dimitrov =

Bulgarian mobster

Konstantin D. Dimitrov
- Born: November 21, 1970; Samokov, PR Bulgaria
- Died: 6 December 2003 (aged 33); Amsterdam, Netherlands
- Education: University of National and World Economy
- Occupation: Businessman
- Spouse: Angelina Dimitrova (m.1996–2003)
- Children: Konstantin Dimitrov Jr.

Konstantin "Samokovetsa" Dimitrov (Bulgarian: Константин Димитров - Самоковеца) (November 21, 1970 – December 6, 2003) was a Bulgarian mobster and one of the major drug traffickers of the Balkans during the late 1990s and early 2000s.

== Background ==
Konstantin Dimitrov was born in Samokov, Bulgaria. He was married with Angelina Dimitrova. They had one son together, Konstantin Dimitrov Jr.

== Career ==
At 16, he was employed as a security guard at Rila hotel in Borovets, Bulgaria. He graduated with a degree in Public Administration from the National and World Economy University. According to his interviews in Bulgarian media, he dealt with trade, consultancy, import, restaurants, and farming. He also owned several firms, and properties in United Kingdom. He owned a hotel, several apartments and houses in the Bulgarian resorts of Borovets and Bistritsa. He was one of the most influential businessman in the Balkans. In 1997, he was a consultant for VIS, and in 2003 he was a consultant for Bulgarian and Cypriot companies trading with Turkey. He soon began smuggling illegal drugs. He became one of the biggest figures in drug trafficking in the Balkans.

== Death ==
On December 6, 2003 Dimitrov was shot dead on Dam Square in Amsterdam.

== Wealth ==
By his early thirties, Dimitrov had accumulated substantial wealth and was regarded as one of the richest Bulgarians of the transition era. He was featured in journalist Grigor Lilov's reference work Най-богатите българи (The Wealthiest Bulgarians), which profiled the most affluent individuals in Bulgaria.
