= Zhelyazkov =

Zhelyazkov (Bulgarian: Желязков) is a Bulgarian masculine patronymic surname, its feminine counterpart is Zhelyazkova. 'Zhelyazo' means 'iron'. It may refer to:

- Andrey Zhelyazkov (born 1952), Bulgarian footballer
- Binka Zhelyazkova (1923–2011), Bulgarian film director
- Dimitar Zhelyazkov (born 1970), Bulgarian criminal
- Dobri Zhelyazkov (1800–1865), Bulgarian businessman
- Plamen Zhelyazkov (born 1972) Bulgarian male weightlifter
- Rosen Zhelyazkov, (born 1968) Bulgarian politician

== See also ==
- Yevgeni Zhelyakov (born 1976), Russian footballer
