= Dimitar Berbatov =

Bulgarian footballer (born 1981)

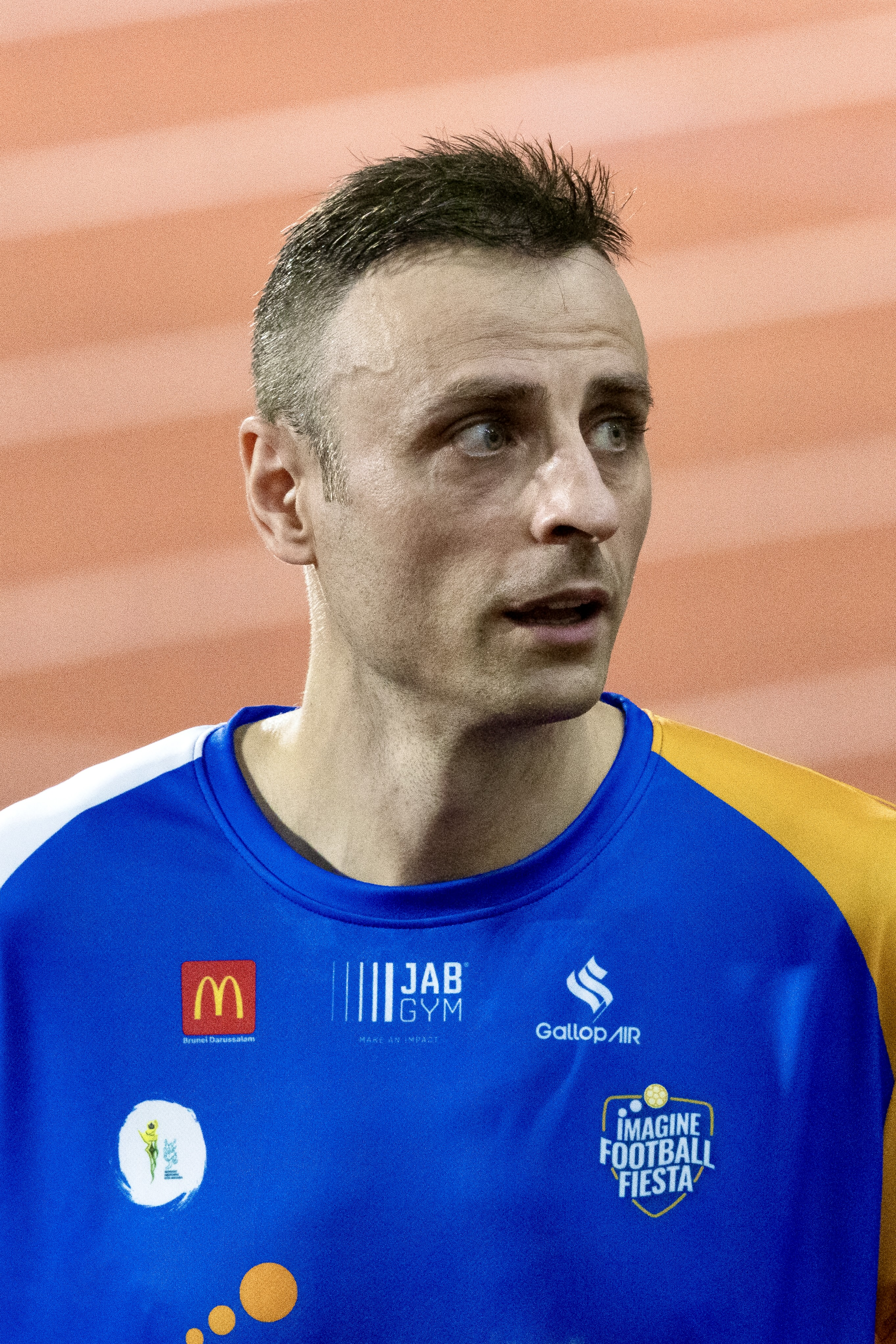
- Berbatov in 2024

Personal information
- Full name: Dimitar Ivanov Berbatov
- Date of birth: 30 January 1981 (age 45)
- Place of birth: Blagoevgrad, Bulgaria
- Height: 1.89 m (6 ft 2 in)
- Position: Striker

Youth career
- 1991–1998: Pirin Blagoevgrad
- 1998: CSKA Sofia

Senior career*
Years	Team	Apps	(Gls)
1998–2001	CSKA Sofia	50	(26)
2001	Bayer Leverkusen II	7	(6)
2001–2006	Bayer Leverkusen	154	(69)
2006–2008	Tottenham Hotspur	70	(27)
2008–2012	Manchester United	108	(48)
2012–2014	Fulham	51	(19)
2014–2015	Monaco	38	(13)
2015–2016	PAOK	17	(4)
2017–2018	Kerala Blasters	9	(1)
Total		504	(213)

International career
1999	Bulgaria U18	2	(2)
1999–2000	Bulgaria U21	3	(3)
1999–2010	Bulgaria	78	(48)
- * Club domestic league appearances and goals

Dimitar Ivanov Berbatov (Bulgarian: Димитър Иванов Бербатов; born 30 January 1981) is a Bulgarian former professional footballer who played as a striker. Known for his technique and ball control, Berbatov is regarded as one of the greatest Bulgarian players of all time. He captained the Bulgarian national team from 2006 to 2010 and is the nation's top goalscorer with 48 goals, a record shared with Hristo Bonev.

Born in Blagoevgrad, Berbatov started out with his home-town club Pirin before joining CSKA Sofia as a 17-year-old in 1998, where he won his first career trophy, the Bulgarian Cup in 1999. He was signed by German Bundesliga club Bayer Leverkusen in January 2001 and played in his first Champions League final 18 months later, coming on as a substitute in the 2002 UEFA Champions League final, which Leverkusen lost 2–1 to Real Madrid. His goalscoring rate improved drastically in his final three seasons with Leverkusen, scoring 59 goals in 100 Bundesliga matches. He was named in the kicker Bundesliga Team of the Season in 2003–04 and 2004–05.

After five and a half years with Leverkusen, Berbatov joined Premier League club Tottenham Hotspur in July 2006. He was named in the PFA Team of the Year in his debut season and won the 2008 Football League Cup in the next season, scoring a penalty in the final to win 2–1 over city rivals Chelsea. In 2008, Berbatov joined Manchester United where he played in his second Champions League final in 2009, during his side's 2–0 defeat against Barcelona. After four seasons with United, during which time he won two Premier League titles in 2008–09 and 2010–11, as well as the Premier League Golden Boot in 2010–11, he joined Fulham in August 2012. He had later spells in France with Monaco, Greece with PAOK, and India with Kerala Blasters, before retiring in 2019.

Berbatov made his debut for Bulgaria on 17 November 1999, aged 18. He represented Bulgaria at Euro 2004 which was the only major tournament he played at for his country, owing to the team's failure to qualify for other tournaments. Berbatov captained the team from 2006 until May 2010, when he announced his retirement from international football, leaving as the joint all-time leading goalscorer for the team. He won the Bulgarian Footballer of the Year a record seven times, surpassing the number of wins by Hristo Stoichkov.

== Early life ==
Dimitar Ivanov Berbatov was born on 30 January 1981 in Blagoevgrad to Ivan Berbatov and Margarita Berbatova, both professional athletes themselves: Ivan was a footballer with Pirin and CSKA Sofia, while Margarita was a handball player. His father and mother worked in a tobacco factory and nursing, respectively, after their sporting careers; during the hardship of the final years of communism in Bulgaria, Berbatov did not have a football and had to practice with a basketball or a pig bladder. Growing up, Berbatov supported Italian club Milan, and he modelled himself after Marco van Basten, their famous Dutch forward. He also idolised England and Newcastle United striker Alan Shearer.

== Club career ==
=== CSKA Sofia ===
Berbatov began his youth career with his home-town club, Pirin, where his talent was spotted and he scored 77 goals for their reserve team in 92 appearances. Berbatov joined the youth squad of his father's former club, CSKA Sofia, after being spotted by scout and manager Dimitar Penev in 1998. He signed his first professional contract with the club and made his debut during the 1998–99 season, at the age of 18. He won the Bulgarian Cup with CSKA at the end of that season. Berbatov's first game in Europe came in September 1999, in a 2–0 defeat against his childhood team Newcastle United; it was during that season, 1999–2000, that he started to make his name, scoring 14 goals in 27 league matches. On 24 August 2000, Berbatov scored five goals in the 8–0 home win over Constructorul Chișinău in a UEFA Cup first qualifying round match, becoming the only CSKA Sofia player to manage this feat in a single game in the European tournaments. Berbatov nearly signed for Italian side Lecce in June 2000, even passing a medical before the move collapsed at the last minute.

=== Bayer Leverkusen ===
A run of nine goals in eleven games during the first half of the 2000–01 season was enough to persuade German club Bayer Leverkusen to pay €1.3 million to sign a four-year contract with Berbatov on 1 January 2001. Berbatov played for the club's reserve team in the Oberliga Nordrhein at first, and scored six goals in seven appearances before being promoted to the first team. He made his team debut in a 4–3 pre-season friendly win against D.C. United, scoring a hat-trick. His league debut for the first team came on 10 February 2001, replacing Ulf Kirsten in a 4–1 victory against 1. FC Köln. Berbatov found himself being used as a substitute by manager Berti Vogts, making six appearances and scoring no goals as Leverkusen finished fourth and qualified for the following season's UEFA Champions League.

During the next season, Berbatov scored 16 goals and made important contributions to the club's Champions League campaign, scoring in a 4–2 win over English club Liverpool in the quarter-finals as Leverkusen eventually reached the final. In the final itself, against Real Madrid, Berbatov came on as a substitute for Thomas Brdarić after 38 minutes before Leverkusen lost 2–1. Leverkusen also finished as runners-up in the Bundesliga behind Borussia Dortmund, and lost the DFB–Pokal final 4–2 to Schalke 04, thus completing an unusual treble of runners-up finishes. Berbatov established his place as the first-choice forward during the next season, 2002–03, and netted his team's goal against Manchester United on 24 September 2002, during a 2–1 defeat for Leverkusen. He scored 16 goals in 24 league appearances during the 2003–04 season, before the following two seasons saw the Bulgarian raise awareness of his talent by netting 46 goals in the league over the two seasons and five times in the 2004–05 Champions League. During this time, he was linked with numerous foreign clubs, including Celtic, Atlético Madrid and Liverpool.

=== Tottenham Hotspur ===
Tottenham Hotspur reached an agreement with Bayer Leverkusen for Berbatov's transfer in May 2006; the fee of €16 million (£10.9 million) made him the most expensive Bulgarian footballer ever. Once he was granted a British work permit, the transfer was completed on 1 July 2006. After Tottenham lost 2–0 to Bolton Wanderers in Berbatov's first league match in England on 19 August 2006, he scored his first goal for Spurs three days later in a 2–0 home victory against Sheffield United.

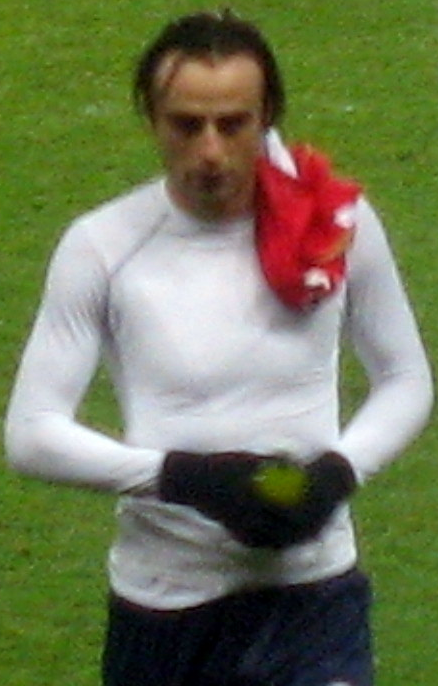
Berbatov in 2008, in the colours of Tottenham Hotspur after a match against rivals Arsenal.

Berbatov's seven goals in eight European games during his debut season for Tottenham helped the club to secure top spot during the UEFA Cup's group stage, making his third European debut in October 2006, scoring a goal during a 2–0 victory against Beşiktaş. He made a total of eight appearances, scoring seven goals as Tottenham were eliminated 3–4 on aggregate against Sevilla. However, he took a while to adapt to the Premier League, taking a few months to regain the league form he had shown at Leverkusen. He gave a strong performance against Wigan Athletic in November 2006, scoring one and creating the other two in a 3–1 win for Spurs, and began to score regularly. He scored his first FA Cup goals on 18 February 2007 when he came on as a second-half substitute in a 4–0 win over Fulham and netted two of the four goals. Berbatov and Spurs teammate Robbie Keane were named joint winners of the Premier League Player of the Month award for April 2007, and in doing so became the first players to share the award since February 2004. He ended the 2006–07 season with 12 goals in 33 appearances in the Premier League, and won both the Tottenham Hotspur Player of the Season award and a place in the PFA Premier League Team of the Year.

Berbatov scored his first Premier League hat-trick on 29 December 2007, scoring four in a 6–4 win over Reading. His first cup final for Tottenham came on 24 February 2008 in the Football League Cup; Spurs faced Chelsea at Wembley Stadium. Berbatov scored an equalising penalty as Tottenham went on to win the game 2–1 after extra time. He ended the season with 15 league goals. Before the next season, 2008–09, Manchester United manager Alex Ferguson was quoted by newspapers as saying he expected to sign Berbatov; Tottenham submitted a complaint to the Premier League alleging that Manchester United had broken league rules. Ongoing rumours of a substantial bid by Ferguson's club unsettled him, and Berbatov was dropped for the games against Sunderland and Chelsea during August, the season's first month.

=== Manchester United ===
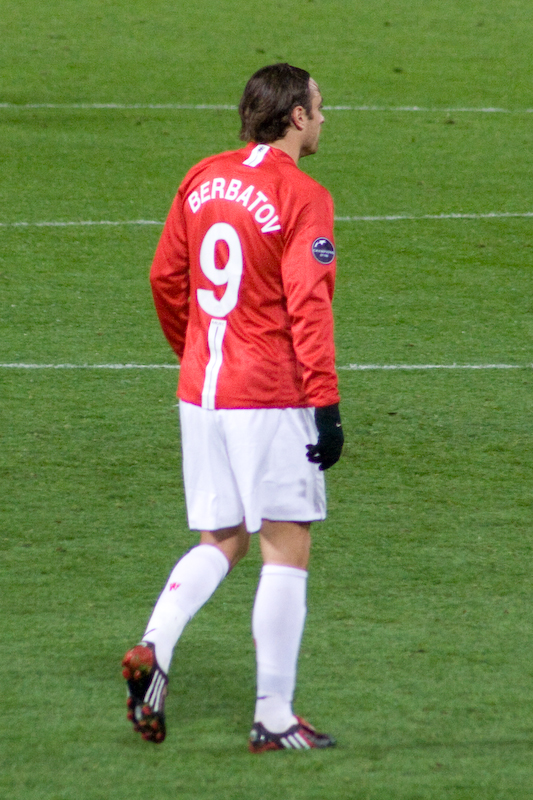
Berbatov playing for Manchester United in October 2008, during a Champions League match against Celtic

Berbatov moved to Manchester United on 1 September 2008, costing the club £30.75 million and signing a four-year contract. Tottenham had also accepted a bid from Manchester City, but Berbatov claimed after signing for United that he "would not even have thought about Manchester City". Arsenal manager Arsène Wenger, meanwhile, accused Tottenham of having used the complaint to the Premier League to negotiate a higher price for Berbatov from Manchester United.

Berbatov marked his Manchester United debut away at Liverpool with an assist for a Carlos Tevez goal, but United lost the game 2–1. His first two goals for the club came in the 3–0 win away to Aalborg BK in the Champions League group stage on 30 September 2008. He netted his first league goals in Manchester United colours during a 4–0 victory over West Bromwich Albion. Alex Ferguson defended Berbatov after he was criticised for missing a penalty during the 2008–09 FA Cup semi-final against Everton, which Manchester United eventually lost by a penalty shoot-out. Soon after, Berbatov scored the fifth of United's goals as they came back from 2–0 down at half-time to win 5–2 against his former team, Tottenham Hotspur. When Manchester United won the Premier League on 16 May 2009, Berbatov became the first Bulgarian to play in an English Premier League title-winning team. After Berbatov struggled to make an impact during the 2009–10 season, there was some media speculation that Berbatov would leave Manchester United, but this was denied by Alex Ferguson.

I think we are being rewarded this season for our confidence in a player who has a touch of genius about him.

— Alex Ferguson on Berbatov following his hat-trick against Liverpool in September 2010.

Berbatov scored United's third goal in the 92nd minute of their 3–1 win over Chelsea in the 2010 Community Shield on 8 August. Eight days later, Berbatov scored his and United's first league goal of the season, opening the scoring in their 3–0 home victory over Newcastle United in the club's first match of the campaign. He scored his first hat-trick for United on 19 September, scoring all three of his team's goals in a 3–2 home win over rivals Liverpool; the second goal, an overhead kick, became a contender for the league's Goal of the Season. It was the first hat-trick by a Manchester United player against Liverpool in 64 years.

Berbatov made his 100th appearance for United on 10 November in a 0–0 away league draw in the Manchester derby on 11 November 2010. Sixteen days later, he tied a league record by scoring five goals in a game during a 7–1 home victory over Blackburn Rovers; he was the first non-Englishman to net five in a Premier League match, and joined Andrew Cole, Alan Shearer and Jermain Defoe as the only players overall to do so. He was named Bulgarian Footballer of the Year for a record seventh time on 20 December 2010.

Berbatov netted his first goals of the 2011 calendar year with his third hat-trick of the season in a 5–0 home win over Birmingham City on 22 January. This made him the first United player since Ruud van Nistelrooy (in 2002–03) to score three hat-tricks in the same season. In January 2011, Berbatov was named by the International Federation of Football History & Statistics as Europe's most popular footballer among active players for 2010. After being dropped to the bench for games against Arsenal and Marseille, Berbatov returned as a second-half substitute for Javier Hernández against Bolton Wanderers on 19 March and scored the winner in the 88th minute (his 20th goal of the season), giving United a 1–0 victory. He scored his 21st in a following Premier League start against Fulham where United won 2–0. As top scorer of Premier League, Berbatov was a member of the PFA Team of the Year for the 2010–11 season alongside Carlos Tevez. Berbatov also shared the Premier League Golden Boot award with his former Manchester United teammate. On 28 May 2011, he was left out of the Manchester United squad for the Champions League Final, in which United lost 3–1 to Barcelona.

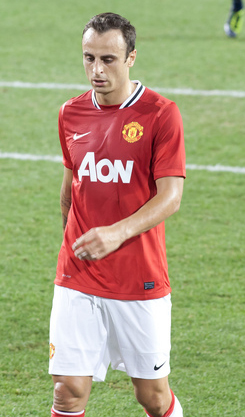
Berbatov playing for Manchester United in 2011

Berbatov played his first game of the 2011–12 season in an away match against West Bromwich Albion, coming on as a substitute replacing Danny Welbeck, a game which United won 2–1. Berbatov appeared from the substitute's bench against Chelsea, replacing the injured Javier Hernández. United won the game 3–1. Berbatov made his first start of the season in the following game, a League Cup third round clash with rivals Leeds United. He played the full game and was required to play at centre back for the last 10 minutes; youngster Zeki Fryers picked up an injury and United had already used all three permitted substitutes. Berbatov struggled for chances on the night, but United did win the game 3–0. On 25 October 2011, he scored the first goal, after a neat passing build-up and also helped set up a goal for Michael Owen in a 3–0 win against Aldershot Town in the fourth round of the League Cup.

On 22 November 2011, Berbatov ended his long run without a goal in the Champions League by scoring the equaliser in a home game against Benfica in a 2–2 draw. On 21 December 2011, he came on as a second-half substitute during a Premier League match against Fulham replacing Danny Welbeck. He scored his 50th goal for Manchester United in all competitions, thus becoming Manchester United's 50th player to score 50 goals for the club. This was also his first goal of the 2011–12 Premier League season.

On 26 December 2011, Berbatov scored a hat-trick in a 5–0 win against Wigan Athletic. This was Berbatov's fourth Premier League hat trick for Manchester United and fifth overall in the division. In the next league game against Blackburn Rovers, Berbatov gave away a first half penalty, when he dragged Christopher Samba to the ground. In the second half, after going 2–0 behind, United responded quickly with two goals from Berbatov. The first, he directed his header past the keeper after Rafael da Silva's mishit cross, and then he fired home Antonio Valencia's pullback to level the game. However, United went on to lose the game 3–2.

In the 2012 January transfer window, Berbatov was linked with a move to Bayern Munich, but the rumour was quashed when Berbatov's contract was extended for another year. On 31 January, Berbatov scored a goal in a 2–0 league win at Old Trafford against Stoke City, scoring the second of two penalties on the night.

=== Fulham ===
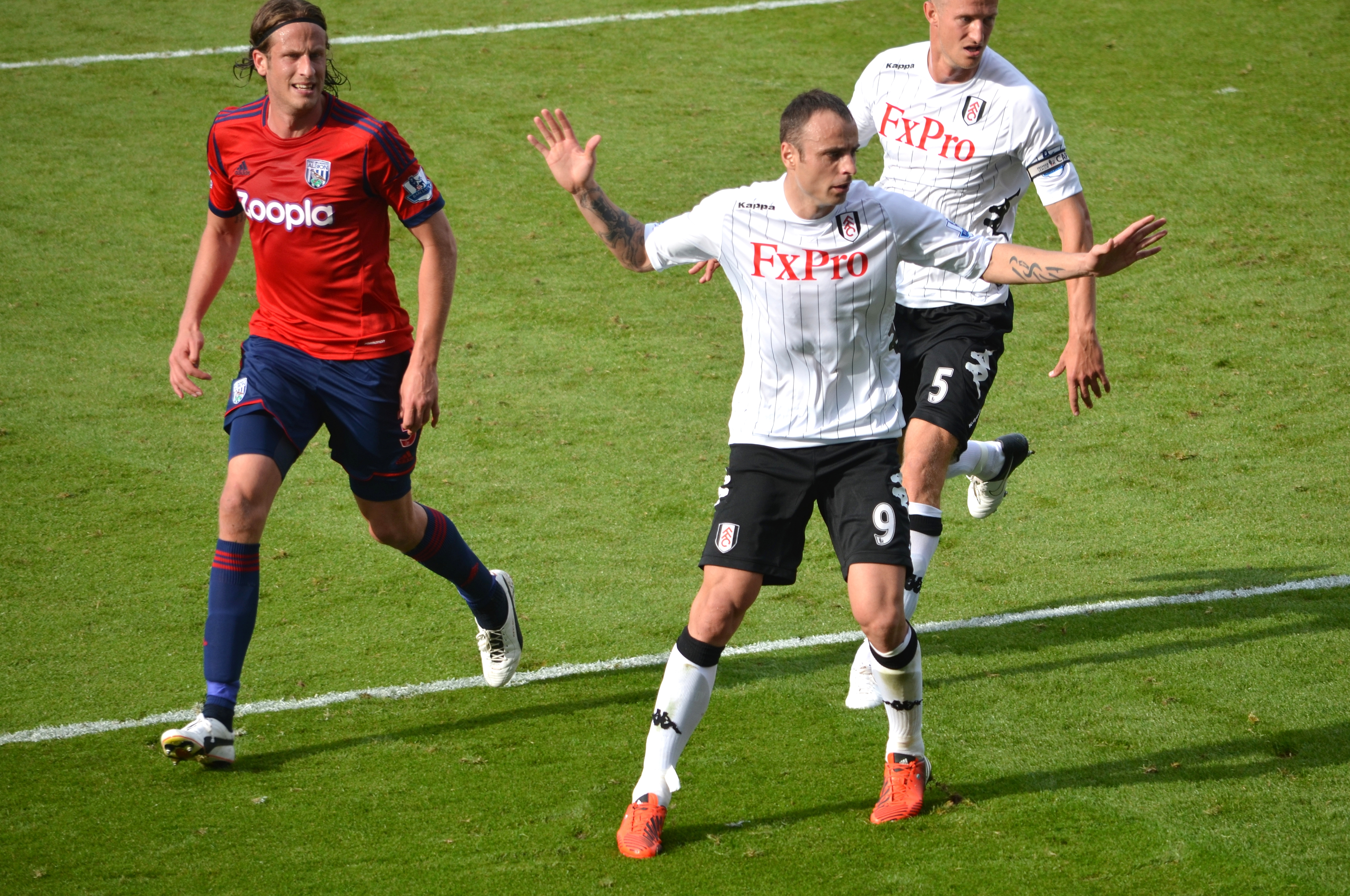
Berbatov playing for Fulham in 2012

On 31 August 2012, it was announced Berbatov had signed a two-year contract with Fulham for an undisclosed fee of approximately £5 million, reuniting with his former Tottenham manager Martin Jol. He made his debut the following day, in a 3–0 loss against West Ham United, coming off the bench at half-time for Mladen Petrić. On 15 September, he made his home debut and scored twice in a 3–0 win against West Bromwich Albion. On 10 November Berbatov played 90 minutes against Arsenal, in a game in which he made an assist and scored twice in a 3–3 draw.

After scoring against Southampton on 26 December 2012, Berbatov took off his shirt to reveal the words "keep calm and pass me the ball" written on his vest, a celebration for which he was yellow-carded and which Jol described as "not the brightest thing to do". On 30 January 2013, his 32nd birthday, Berbatov scored the first in a 3–1 home win against West Ham, raising his tally in the Premier League to eight since joining the Cottagers. On 17 March, he scored the only goal of a win at his former club Tottenham; it was his fourth in five games and 11th overall. After his goal, teammates Ashkan Dejagah and Sascha Riether celebrated with each other and not with Berbatov, which Jol said was due to Berbatov's body language being misconstrued as critical of his teammates. He followed it two weeks later with a brace in the first half of a 3–2 win over West London rivals Queens Park Rangers, and finished the season with 15 goals in 33 games, joint seventh best in the league.

In 2013–14, Berbatov filled in as Fulham captain during Brede Hangeland's injury absence. As with the previous season, he was criticised by fans and pundits for appearing disinterested and reacting badly when not passed to, and contributed 5 goals in 19 games in the first half of the season. The season ended with Fulham relegated in 19th place, after the dismissals of Jol and his replacement René Meulensteen.

=== Monaco ===
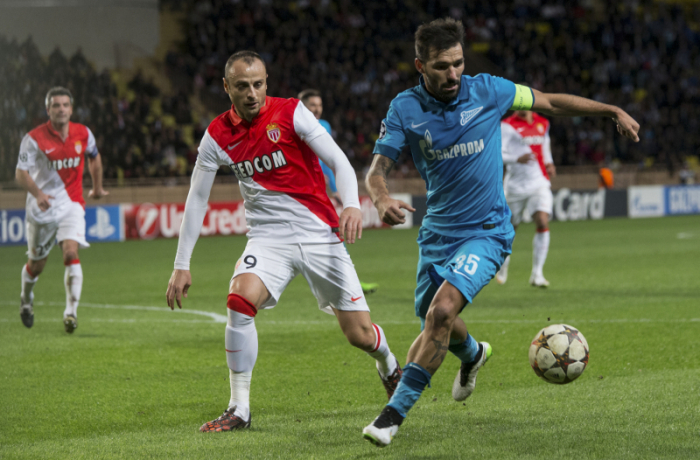
Berbatov appearing for AS Monaco in December 2014 in a UEFA Champions League group stage match against Zenit St. Petersburg

On the January 2014 deadline, it was reported that AS Monaco had signed Berbatov to replace the injured Radamel Falcao for the remainder of the season. At first, it was believed to be a loan move, although it was later revealed that Fulham had released Berbatov. Berbatov made his Ligue 1 debut in a 1–1 home draw against Paris Saint-Germain on 9 February, coming on as a second-half substitute for Valère Germain. His first goal came three days later, scoring in extra time for a 1–0 win over Nice in the Coupe de France. Berbatov scored his first goal in the league on 8 March in a 2–1 home win against Sochaux. He ended the season with 6 goals from 12 league games and on 16 May, he signed a new one-year contract at the club. In the first leg of the Champions League match against Arsenal, Berbatov scored a second away goal, in a 3–1 victory. He left the club on 1 June 2015, after the club decided against renewing his contract, with Monaco releasing a statement praising the 34-year-old for his "character, his professionalism and his great talent". Monaco president Vadim Vasilyev added: "He is clearly among the greatest strikers who have played for Monaco. We are proud of what he brought to the club and wish him the best in the future."

=== PAOK ===
On 2 September 2015, it was announced that Berbatov had signed a one-year contract with Greek club PAOK. On 10 June 2016, he was released after a single season.

=== Kerala Blasters ===
After a year without a club, Berbatov signed with Indian Super League club Kerala Blasters on 23 August 2017 on a one-year deal for a salary of ₹75 million (approximately £900,000). Berbatov scored his first goal against ATK on 8 February 2018. Berbatov was mainly used as a substitute or as a defensive midfielder instead of his prime position as a striker and commented that the then-manager David James used "absurd tactics". He left the club at the end of the regular season in March 2018.

=== Retirement ===
After a year-and-a-half without a club, but training several times with Beroe Stara Zagora, Berbatov officially announced his retirement from football on 19 September 2019.

Following his retirement Berbatov competed in matches for other charities, including Unity Kickoff – Play For a Cause and the David James Foundation. He had also competed at Soccer Aid 2016 for Team Rest of the World prior to retirement.

Berbatov has also competed in legends matches for his former clubs. He has competed in three matches for Manchester United in 2022, 2024 and 2025 as well as one match for Tottenham Hotspur in 2025, with all four of these matches being held in benefit for the club's two non-profit foundations.

== International career ==
Berbatov made his debut for Bulgaria on 17 November 1999, aged 18, when he came on as a substitute for Aleksandar Aleksandrov in a 1–0 friendly loss against Greece. He scored his first goal for his country on 12 February 2000 in another friendly defeat, 3–2 against Chile, and represented Bulgaria at Euro 2004. This was the only major tournament he played at for his country, owing to the team's failure to qualify for other tournaments. In 2007, he scored two goals in the final of the Cyprus International Football Tournament against the host nation, Cyprus, to give Bulgaria a 3–0 win and Berbatov his only international title with the national team. He scored a hat-trick in the 6–2 home win in a 2010 World Cup qualification match against Georgia in October 2009, enabling him to bring his goal tally for the national side to 46 goals, just one short of the then all-time top scorer for Bulgaria, Hristo Bonev; after scoring two goals against Malta during a 4–1 friendly away win during the following month, he took the record.

Berbatov captained the team from 2006 until May 2010, when he announced his retirement from international football, leaving his tally for Bulgaria standing at 48 goals from 78 matches. In February 2012, newly appointed Bulgaria head coach Lyuboslav Penev revealed that Berbatov was willing to consider coming out of international retirement and participate in an upcoming friendly against Hungary. Berbatov eventually decided against accepting a call-up for the match, as he didn't feel that he was in top shape, but at the time did not rule out a return to the national side at some point in the future. In September 2012, he reconfirmed his international retirement.

=== Soccer Aid ===
In May 2016, it was revealed that Berbatov would return to Old Trafford to play for the Rest of the World in Soccer Aid, a charity football match in aid of the United Nations Children's Emergency Fund (UNICEF), alongside the likes of Jaap Stam, Robbie Fowler, and Jamie Carragher. He scored two goals in an eventual 3–2 loss to England.

== Style of play ==
"I am a relaxed guy. I play that way and I can't change my style. I watch games and see guys who panic on the ball – they look so nervous. I can be calm, because I sometimes know what I want to do before the ball comes to me. The boss [Alex Ferguson] tells me not to change anything – he gives me freedom to express my qualities."

— Berbatov describes his style of play in 2009

Berbatov was known for his footballing intelligence, technical ability, ball control, and composure; in particular, his unhurried stance in front of goal was described by The Scotsman's Tom Lappin as "elegant and calm". He also possessed exceptional precision when passing and shooting, and took his time when on attack in order to ensure the best move possible. As such, he was often used as a deep-lying centre forward, receiving passes from the midfield, holding the ball up and then using his tactical acumen and well-honed skill to bring his teammates into the game. He was also deployed as a lone striker at times, due to his goalscoring ability. His impressive physical stature combined with these attributes to form a strong all-round attacking player.

It was because of these characteristics that he was signed by Manchester United, who intended for Berbatov to complement the combative and busy style of their English striker Wayne Rooney. Whereas Rooney was known for exerting himself vigorously for the entirety of a match, Berbatov employed a more laid-back and composed style, and because of this was sometimes criticised by observers who interpreted this as laziness; he was also accused of being inconsistent at times by certain pundits. On signing for Manchester United, Berbatov attracted comparisons with former United forward Eric Cantona, not only because of his languid and impeccable touch, but also because of his bravado and perceived arrogance. Berbatov was, however, capable of adapting his style to play more directly when required; in April 2010, for example, with Rooney absent, Berbatov gave a performance against his former side Tottenham which, in James Ducker's words, was as if he had "decided to take it upon himself to impersonate the England striker". Combining uncharacteristic determination and effort with his regular technical skill, he contributed to the first Manchester United goal and helped United to a 3–1 victory.

== Personal life ==
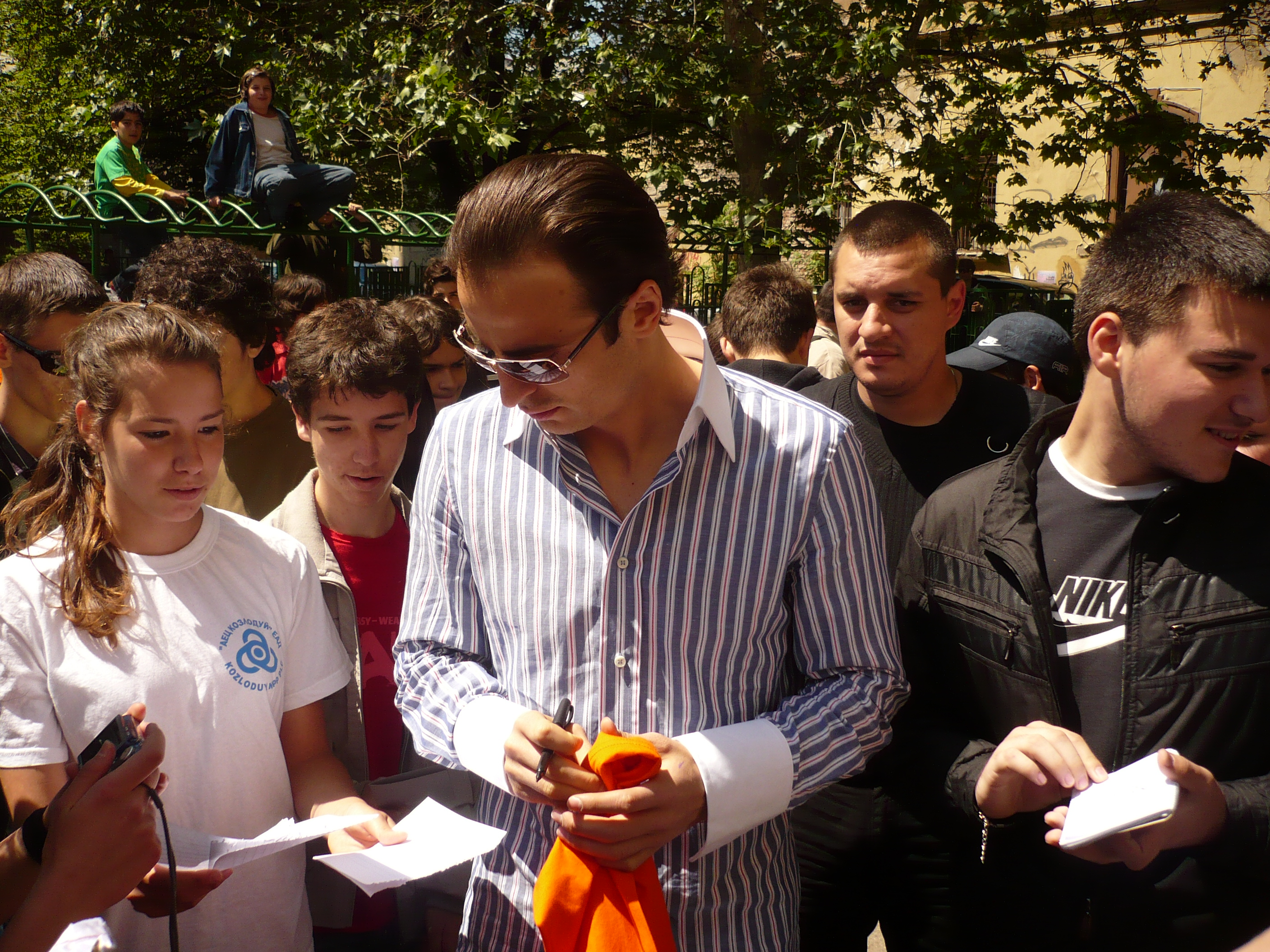
Berbatov signing autographs in 2009

Berbatov maintained a private family life outside the pitch, kept a small inner circle of confidants and rarely socialised with his teammates. He learned to speak English by watching the American Godfather series of films; outside football, he lists his hobbies as drawing and basketball. Berbatov is a sponsor of children's charities in his native Bulgaria, supporting five care homes. He is also the founder of the Dimitar Berbatov Foundation, which helps young people to develop their talents. Berbatov's long-time girlfriend, Elena, gave birth to their first child on 15 October 2009 at a hospital in Sofia. In November 2012, he had his second daughter.

Berbatov claims that at the age of eighteen, he was held hostage with plans of making him sign for Georgi Iliev's football team, Levski Kyustendil. Berbatov's father contacted CSKA Sofia's boss Iliya Pavlov who set things straight. In 2009, reports emerged that Berbatov was forced to leave Bulgaria, since local mafia threatened to kidnap his family. In November 2018, Berbatov officially unveiled his autobiography По моя начин (In my own way). The foreword was written by former Manchester United manager Sir Alex Ferguson, who apologised for leaving Berbatov out of the 2011 UEFA Champions League final.

== Career statistics ==
=== Club ===
Appearances and goals by club, season and competition
Club	Season	League			National cup		League cup		Continental		Other		Total	
Club	Season	Division	Apps	Goals	Apps	Goals	Apps	Goals	Apps	Goals	Apps	Goals	Apps	Goals
CSKA Sofia	1998–99	PFG	11	3	5	3	—		0	0	—		16	6
CSKA Sofia	1999–2000	PFG	27	14	4	2	—		3	0	—		34	16
CSKA Sofia	2000–01	PFG	12	9	0	0	—		4	7	—		16	16
CSKA Sofia	Total		50	26	9	5	—		7	7	—		66	38
Bayer Leverkusen II	2000–01	Oberliga Nordrhein	7	6	—		—		—		—		7	6
Bayer Leverkusen	2000–01	Bundesliga	6	0	0	0	0	0	0	0	—		6	0
Bayer Leverkusen	2001–02	Bundesliga	24	8	6	6	0	0	11	2	—		41	16
Bayer Leverkusen	2002–03	Bundesliga	24	4	2	0	1	0	7	2	—		34	6
Bayer Leverkusen	2003–04	Bundesliga	33	16	3	3	0	0	—		—		36	19
Bayer Leverkusen	2004–05	Bundesliga	33	20	1	1	2	0	10	5	—		46	26
Bayer Leverkusen	2005–06	Bundesliga	34	21	2	3	0	0	2	0	—		38	24
Bayer Leverkusen	Total		154	69	14	13	3	0	30	9	—		201	91
Tottenham Hotspur	2006–07	Premier League	33	12	5	3	3	1	8	7	—		49	23
Tottenham Hotspur	2007–08	Premier League	36	15	2	2	6	1	8	5	—		52	23
Tottenham Hotspur	2008–09	Premier League	1	0	0	0	0	0	0	0	—		1	0
Tottenham Hotspur	Total		70	27	7	5	9	2	16	12	—		102	46
Manchester United	2008–09	Premier League	31	9	3	1	0	0	9	4	—		43	14
Manchester United	2009–10	Premier League	33	12	1	0	2	0	6	0	1 (Note: Appearance in FA Community Shield)	0	43	12
Manchester United	2010–11	Premier League	32	20	2	0	0	0	7	0	1	1	42	21
Manchester United	2011–12	Premier League	12	7	1	0	3	1	4	1	1	0	21	9
Manchester United	2012–13	Premier League	0	0	—		—		—		—		0	0
Manchester United	Total		108	48	7	1	5	1	26	5	3	1	149	56
Fulham	2012–13	Premier League	33	15	2	0	0	0	—		—		35	15
Fulham	2013–14	Premier League	18	4	0	0	1	1	—		—		19	5
Fulham	Total		51	19	2	0	1	1	—		—		54	20
Monaco	2013–14	Ligue 1	12	6	3	3	0	0	—		—		15	9
Monaco	2014–15	Ligue 1	26	7	1	0	2	1	9	1	—		38	9
Monaco	Total		38	13	4	3	2	1	9	1	—		53	18
PAOK	2015–16	Super League Greece	17	4	3	1	—		5	0	—		25	5
Kerala Blasters	2017–18	Indian Super League	9	1	—		—		—		—		9	1
Career total			504	213	46	28	20	5	93	34	3	1	666	281

=== International ===
Appearances and goals by national team and year
National team	Year	Apps	Goals
Bulgaria	1999	1	0
Bulgaria	2000	3	2
Bulgaria	2001	8	4
Bulgaria	2002	5	2
Bulgaria	2003	8	7
Bulgaria	2004	12	9
Bulgaria	2005	10	7
Bulgaria	2006	6	0
Bulgaria	2007	9	8
Bulgaria	2008	7	2
Bulgaria	2009	8	7
Bulgaria	2010	1	0
Total		78	48

Scores and results list Bulgaria's goal tally first, score column indicates score after each Berbatov goal.

List of international goals scored by Dimitar Berbatov
No.	Date	Venue	Opponent	Score	Result	Competition
1	12 February 2000	Estadio Playa Ancha, Valparaíso	Chile	1–2	2–3	Friendly
2	11 October 2000	Parken Stadium, Copenhagen	Denmark	1–1	1–1	2002 FIFA World Cup qualification
3	24 March 2001	Balgarska Armiya Stadium, Sofia	Iceland	2–1	2–1	2002 FIFA World Cup qualification
4	6 June 2001	Laugardalsvöllur, Reykjavík	Iceland	1–1	1–1	2002 FIFA World Cup qualification
5	1 September 2001	Ta' Qali National Stadium, Valletta	Malta	1–0	2–0	2002 FIFA World Cup qualification
6	1 September 2001	Ta' Qali National Stadium, Valletta	Malta	2–0	2–0	2002 FIFA World Cup qualification
7	21 August 2002	Vasil Levski National Stadium, Sofia	Germany	1–0	2–2	Friendly
8	12 October 2002	Vasil Levski National Stadium, Sofia	Croatia	2–0	2–0	UEFA Euro 2004 qualification
9	30 April 2003	Vasil Levski National Stadium, Sofia	Albania	1–0	2–0	Friendly
10	30 April 2003	Vasil Levski National Stadium, Sofia	Albania	2–0	2–0	Friendly
11	7 June 2003	Vasil Levski National Stadium, Sofia	Belgium	1–1	2–2	UEFA Euro 2004 qualification
12	20 August 2003	Vasil Levski National Stadium, Sofia	Lithuania	2–0	3–0	Friendly
13	6 September 2003	Vasil Levski National Stadium, Sofia	Estonia	2–0	2–0	UEFA Euro 2004 qualification
14	10 September 2003	Estadi Comunal d'Aixovall, Andorra la Vella	Andorra	1–0	3–0	UEFA Euro 2004 qualification
15	10 September 2003	Estadi Comunal d'Aixovall, Andorra la Vella	Andorra	2–0	3–0	UEFA Euro 2004 qualification
16	31 March 2004	Vasil Levski National Stadium, Sofia	Russia	1–1	2–2	Friendly
17	31 March 2004	Vasil Levski National Stadium, Sofia	Russia	2–2	2–2	Friendly
18	28 April 2004	Vasil Levski National Stadium, Sofia	Cameroon	1–0	3–0	Friendly
19	28 April 2004	Vasil Levski National Stadium, Sofia	Cameroon	2–0	3–0	Friendly
20	4 September 2004	Laugardalsvöllur, Reykjavík	Iceland	1–0	3–1	2006 FIFA World Cup qualification
21	4 September 2004	Laugardalsvöllur, Reykjavík	Iceland	2–0	3–1	2006 FIFA World Cup qualification
22	9 October 2004	Stadion Maksimir, Zagreb	Croatia	2–2	2–2	2006 FIFA World Cup qualification
23	13 October 2004	Ta' Qali National Stadium, Valletta	Malta	1–1	4–1	2006 FIFA World Cup qualification
24	13 October 2004	Ta' Qali National Stadium, Valletta	Malta	3–1	4–1	2006 FIFA World Cup qualification
25	17 August 2005	Vasil Levski National Stadium, Sofia	Turkey	1–1	3–1	Friendly
26	17 August 2005	Vasil Levski National Stadium, Sofia	Turkey	3–1	3–1	Friendly
27	7 September 2005	Vasil Levski National Stadium, Sofia	Iceland	1–2	3–2	2006 FIFA World Cup qualification
28	8 October 2005	Vasil Levski National Stadium, Sofia	Hungary	1–0	2–0	2006 FIFA World Cup qualification
29	12 November 2005	Vasil Levski National Stadium, Sofia	Georgia	3–0	6–2	Friendly
30	12 November 2005	Vasil Levski National Stadium, Sofia	Georgia	4–0	6–2	Friendly
31	16 November 2005	Reliant Stadium, Houston	Mexico	3–0	3–0	Friendly
32	7 February 2007	GSP Stadium, Nicosia	Cyprus	1–0	3–0	Friendly
33	7 February 2007	GSP Stadium, Nicosia	Cyprus	3–0	3–0	Friendly
34	2 June 2007	Dinamo Stadium, Minsk	Belarus	1–0	2–0	UEFA Euro 2008 qualification
35	2 June 2007	Dinamo Stadium, Minsk	Belarus	2–0	2–0	UEFA Euro 2008 qualification
36	12 September 2007	Vasil Levski National Stadium, Sofia	Luxembourg	1–0	3–0	UEFA Euro 2008 qualification
37	12 September 2007	Vasil Levski National Stadium, Sofia	Luxembourg	2–0	3–0	UEFA Euro 2008 qualification
38	17 October 2007	Qemal Stafa Stadium, Tirana	Albania	1–1	1–1	UEFA Euro 2008 qualification
39	21 November 2007	Arena Petrol, Celje	Slovenia	2–0	2–0	UEFA Euro 2008 qualification
40	20 August 2008	Bilino Polje, Zenica	Bosnia and Herzegovina	1–0	2–1	Friendly
41	20 August 2008	Bilino Polje, Zenica	Bosnia and Herzegovina	2–0	2–1	Friendly
42	5 September 2009	Vasil Levski National Stadium, Sofia	Montenegro	3–1	4–1	2010 FIFA World Cup qualification
43	10 October 2009	Antonis Papadopoulos Stadium, Larnaca	Cyprus	1–2	1–4	2010 FIFA World Cup qualification
44	14 October 2009	Vasil Levski National Stadium, Sofia	Georgia	1–0	6–2	2010 FIFA World Cup qualification
45	14 October 2009	Vasil Levski National Stadium, Sofia	Georgia	3–0	6–2	2010 FIFA World Cup qualification
46	14 October 2009	Vasil Levski National Stadium, Sofia	Georgia	5–1	6–2	2010 FIFA World Cup qualification
47	18 November 2009	Hibernians Ground, Paola	Malta	2–1	4–1	Friendly
48	18 November 2009	Hibernians Ground, Paola	Malta	4–1	4–1	Friendly

== Honours ==
CSKA Sofia

- Bulgarian Cup: 1998–99

Bayer Leverkusen

- DFB-Pokal runner-up: 2001–02
- UEFA Champions League runner-up: 2001–02

Tottenham Hotspur

- Football League Cup: 2007–08

Manchester United

- Premier League: 2008–09, 2010–11
- Football League Cup: 2009–10
- FA Community Shield: 2010, 2011
- FIFA Club World Cup: 2008
- UEFA Champions League runner-up: 2008–09, 2010–11

Individual

- kicker Bundesliga Team of the Season: 2003–04, 2004–05
- Bulgarian Man of the Year: 2009
- Bulgarian Footballer of the Year: 2002, 2004, 2005, 2007, 2008, 2009, 2010
- Monaco Player of the Year: 2014
- Fulham Player of the Season: 2012–13
- Tottenham Hotspur Player of the Year: 2006–07
- UNFP Ligue 1 Player of the Month: April 2014
- Premier League Player of the Month: April 2007, January 2011
- PFA Team of the Year: 2006–07 Premier League, 2010–11 Premier League
- Premier League Golden Boot: 2010–11
- FIFA FIFPro World XI Nominee: 2007, 2008, 2010

== See also ==
- List of top international men's football goal scorers by country
