= Georgi Iliev (businessman) =

Bulgarian businessman and mobster (1966–2005)

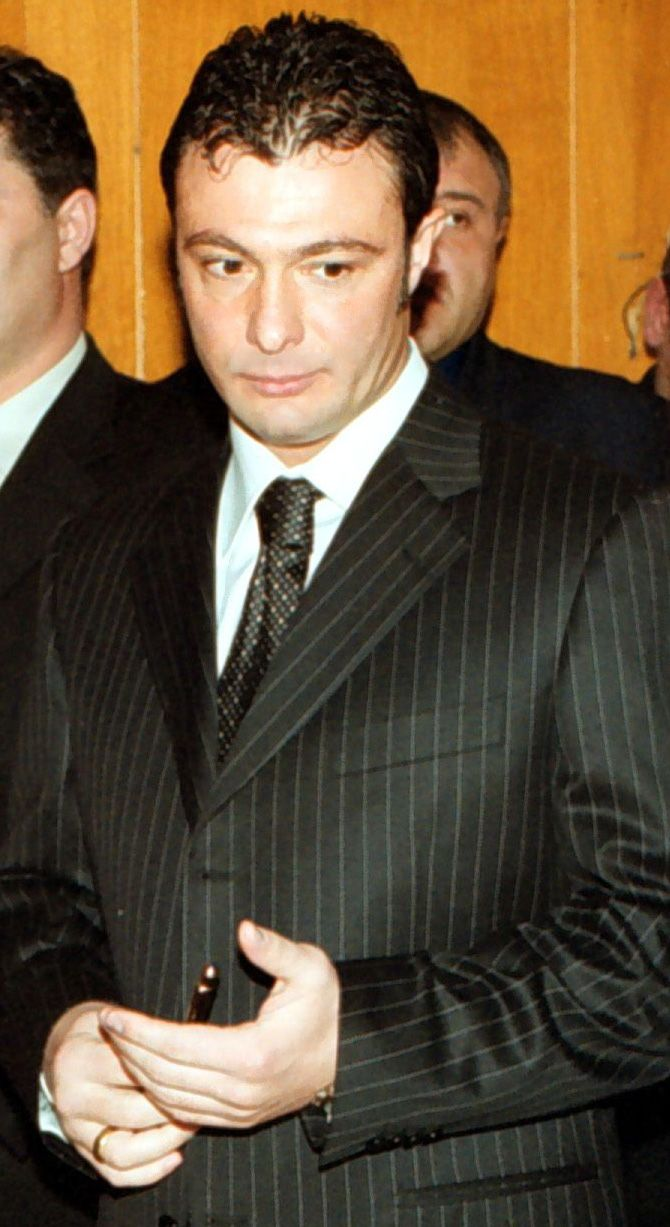
- Iliev in 2002
- Born: July 22, 1966; Kyustendil, PR Bulgaria
- Died: August 25, 2005 (aged 39); Sunny Beach, Bulgaria
- Spouse: Maya Ilieva (m.1994–2005)
- Relatives: Vasil Iliev (brother); Mariana Ilieva (sister)

Georgi Andreev Iliev (Bulgarian: Георги Андреев Илиев; July 22, 1966 – August 25, 2005) was a Bulgarian businessman, best known for being a mobster, just like his brother Vasil, and continuing the operation of their crime syndicate VIS.

== Biography ==
In his early years he won several wrestling competitions and a few gold medals, but had to stop his sports career because of a criminal conviction due to his involvement in a group rape. Upon his release from prison he became something of a small-time criminal. After the death of his brother Vasil Iliev, he became the boss of a criminal organization called VIS, which fronted as a legitimate security and insurance provider. The former head secretary of the Bulgarian Ministry of Internal Affairs Boyko Borisov claims to information showing Georgi Iliev's involvement in drug dealing and smuggling operations. According to Grigor Lilov, author of "The Richest Bulgarians", Georgi Iliiev had amassed a fortune of over $250 million.

He is also thought to have taken an eighteen-year-old Dimitar Berbatov hostage with plans of making him sign for his football team, Levski Kyustendil. Berbatov's father contacted CSKA Sofia's boss Iliya Pavlov who set things straight.

== Death ==
He was shot and killed at a restaurant in Sunny Beach, a resort town on Bulgaria's Black Sea coast near the city of Bourgas, by a suspected sniper. The same evening his club Lokomotiv won 1:0 against OFK Beograd (2:2 on aggregate) and continued in the next round of UEFA Cup where it was eventually eliminated by Bolton. Iliev was alleged to be an organized crime boss, and so his murder was suspected to be part of an ongoing turf war between rival criminal gangs. His brother Vasil Iliev was also shot and killed in 1995 in Sofia.
