= List of international goals scored by Dimitar Berbatov =

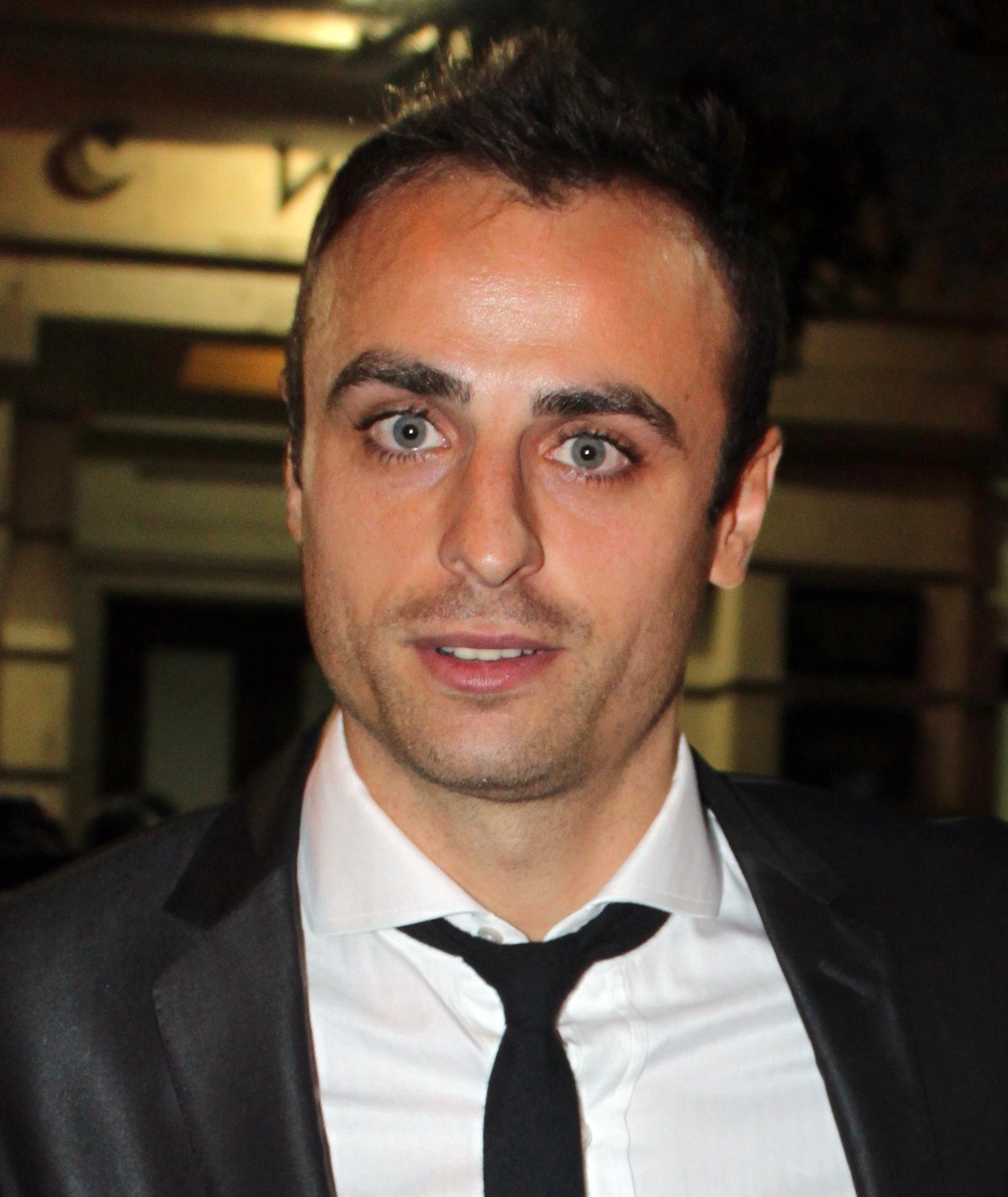
Berbatov (pictured in 2011) scored 48 goals for the national team until his retirement in 2010.

Dimitar Berbatov is a Bulgarian former professional footballer who played as a forward. He made his debut for the Bulgarian national team on 17 November 1999, at the age of 18. He made 78 appearances for the national team and was the captain from 2006 until his retirement in May 2010. Berbatov scored 48 goals and finished as the country's joint all-time top scorer with Hristo Bonev. (Note: Hristo Bonev has been listed with having scored 48 goals in 96 international matches, but some sources report this figure as 47.)

Berbatov made his debut appearance for the national team on 17 November 1999 as a substitute for Aleksandar Aleksandrov in a 1–0 friendly loss to Greece. He scored his first goal for the national team on 12 February 2000 in a 3–2 friendly loss to Chile. In 2007, he scored two goals in the final of the Cyprus International Football Tournament against the host nation, Cyprus, to give Bulgaria a 3–0 win and Berbatov his only international title with the national team. On 14 October 2009, he scored his first and only hat-trick for the national team in a 6–2 win against Georgia. Berbatov scored his last two goals in a friendly against Malta in November 2009 and retired in May 2010.

Despite appearing in 24 FIFA World Cup qualifiers for the 2002, 2006, and 2010 editions, he and Bulgaria could not reach the competition proper, in which they had last appeared in 1998. Berbatov appeared at UEFA Euro 2004, where he made three appearances and did not score a goal, with Bulgaria finishing last in their group. This was the only major tournament that he played for Bulgaria. He retired from the national team at the age of 29; many believed that he lacked the motivation and drive to impel a weak squad and that his performances for the team were sometimes too "languid" or laid back.

== Goals ==
Table key
Indicates Bulgaria won the match
Indicates the match ended in a draw
Indicates Bulgaria lost the match

International goals scored by Dimitar Berbatov
No.	Cap	Date	Venue	Opponent	Result	Competition
1	2	12 February 2000	Estadio Playa Ancha, Valparaíso, Chile	Chile	2–3	Friendly
2	4	11 October 2000	Parken Stadium, Copenhagen, Denmark	Denmark	1–1	2002 FIFA World Cup qualification
3	6	24 March 2001	Vasil Levski National Stadium, Sofia, Bulgaria	Iceland	2–1	2002 FIFA World Cup qualification
4	9	6 June 2001	Laugardalsvöllur, Reykjavík, Iceland	Iceland	1–1	2002 FIFA World Cup qualification
5	10	1 September 2001	National Stadium, Ta' Qali, Malta	Malta	2–0	2002 FIFA World Cup qualification
6	10	1 September 2001	National Stadium, Ta' Qali, Malta	Malta	2–0	2002 FIFA World Cup qualification
7	15	21 August 2002	Vasil Levski National Stadium, Sofia, Bulgaria	Germany	2–2	Friendly
8	16	12 October 2002	Vasil Levski National Stadium, Sofia, Bulgaria	Croatia	2–0	UEFA Euro 2004 qualifying
9	20	30 April 2003	Vasil Levski National Stadium, Sofia, Bulgaria	Albania	2–0	Friendly
10	20	30 April 2003	Vasil Levski National Stadium, Sofia, Bulgaria	Albania	2–0	Friendly
11	21	7 June 2003	Vasil Levski National Stadium, Sofia, Bulgaria	Belgium	2–2	UEFA Euro 2004 qualifying
12	22	20 August 2003	Vasil Levski National Stadium, Sofia, Bulgaria	Lithuania	3–0	Friendly
13	23	6 September 2003	Vasil Levski National Stadium, Sofia, Bulgaria	Estonia	2–0	UEFA Euro 2004 qualifying
14	24	10 September 2003	Estadi Comunal, Andorra la vella, Andorra	Andorra	3–0	UEFA Euro 2004 qualifying
15	24	10 September 2003	Estadi Comunal, Andorra la vella, Andorra	Andorra	3–0	UEFA Euro 2004 qualifying
16	27	31 March 2004	Vasil Levski National Stadium, Sofia, Bulgaria	Russia	2–2	Friendly
17	27	31 March 2004	Vasil Levski National Stadium, Sofia, Bulgaria	Russia	2–2	Friendly
18	28	28 April 2004	Vasil Levski National Stadium, Sofia, Bulgaria	Cameroon	3–0	Friendly
19	28	28 April 2004	Vasil Levski National Stadium, Sofia, Bulgaria	Cameroon	3–0	Friendly
20	34	4 September 2004	Laugardalsvöllur, Reykjavík, Iceland	Iceland	3–1	2006 FIFA World Cup qualification
21	34	4 September 2004	Laugardalsvöllur, Reykjavík, Iceland	Iceland	3–1	2006 FIFA World Cup qualification
22	35	9 October 2004	Maksimir Stadium, Zagreb, Croatia	Croatia	2–2	2006 FIFA World Cup qualification
23	36	13 October 2004	Vasil Levski National Stadium, Sofia, Bulgaria	Malta	4–1	2006 FIFA World Cup qualification
24	36	13 October 2004	Vasil Levski National Stadium, Sofia, Bulgaria	Malta	4–1	2006 FIFA World Cup qualification
25	42	17 August 2005	Vasil Levski National Stadium, Sofia, Bulgaria	Turkey	3–1	Friendly
26	42	17 August 2005	Vasil Levski National Stadium, Sofia, Bulgaria	Turkey	3–1	Friendly
27	43	7 September 2005	Vasil Levski National Stadium, Sofia, Bulgaria	Iceland	3–2	2006 FIFA World Cup qualification
28	44	8 October 2005	Vasil Levski National Stadium, Sofia, Bulgaria	Hungary	2–0	2006 FIFA World Cup qualification
29	46	12 November 2005	Vasil Levski National Stadium, Sofia, Bulgaria	Georgia	6–2	Friendly
30	46	12 November 2005	Vasil Levski National Stadium, Sofia, Bulgaria	Georgia	6–2	Friendly
31	47	16 November 2005	Reliant Stadium, Houston, USA	Mexico	3–0	Friendly
32	54	7 February 2007	GSP Stadium, Nicosia, Cyprus	Cyprus	3–0	Cyprus International Football Tournament
33	54	7 February 2007	GSP Stadium, Nicosia, Cyprus	Cyprus	3–0	Cyprus International Football Tournament
34	56	2 June 2007	Dinamo Stadium, Minsk, Belarus	Belarus	2–0	UEFA Euro 2008 qualifying
35	56	2 June 2007	Dinamo Stadium, Minsk, Belarus	Belarus	2–0	UEFA Euro 2008 qualifying
36	59	12 September 2007	Vasil Levski National Stadium, Sofia, Bulgaria	Luxembourg	3–0	UEFA Euro 2008 qualifying
37	59	12 September 2007	Vasil Levski National Stadium, Sofia, Bulgaria	Luxembourg	3–0	UEFA Euro 2008 qualifying
38	60	17 October 2007	Qemal Stafa Stadium, Tirana, Albania	Albania	1–1	UEFA Euro 2008 qualifying
39	62	21 November 2007	Vasil Levski National Stadium, Sofia, Bulgaria	Slovenia	2–0	UEFA Euro 2008 qualifying
40	65	20 August 2008	Bilino Polje Stadium, Zenica, Bosnia and Herzegovina	Bosnia and Herzegovina	2–1	Friendly
41	65	20 August 2008	Bilino Polje Stadium, Zenica, Bosnia and Herzegovina	Bosnia and Herzegovina	2–1	Friendly
42	73	5 September 2009	Vasil Levski National Stadium, Sofia, Bulgaria	Montenegro	4–1	2010 FIFA World Cup qualification
43	75	10 October 2009	Antonis Papadopoulos Stadium, Larnaca, Cyprus	Cyprus	1–4	2010 FIFA World Cup qualification
44	76	14 October 2009	Vasil Levski National Stadium, Sofia, Bulgaria	Georgia	6–2	2010 FIFA World Cup qualification
45	76	14 October 2009	Vasil Levski National Stadium, Sofia, Bulgaria	Georgia	6–2	2010 FIFA World Cup qualification
46	76	14 October 2009	Vasil Levski National Stadium, Sofia, Bulgaria	Georgia	6–2	2010 FIFA World Cup qualification
47	77	18 November 2009	Hibernians Stadium, Paola, Malta	Malta	4–1	Friendly
48	77	18 November 2009	Hibernians Stadium, Paola, Malta	Malta	4–1	Friendly

== Statistics ==
Appearances and goals by competition
Competition	Apps	Goals
FIFA World Cup qualification	24	17
UEFA European Championship qualifying	17	11
Friendlies	33	18
Cyprus International Football Tournament	1	2
Total	78	48

Goals by opponent
Opponent	Goals
Malta	6
Georgia	5
Iceland	5
Albania	3
Cyprus	3
Andorra	2
Belarus	2
Bosnia and Herzegovina	2
Cameroon	2
Croatia	2
Luxembourg	2
Russia	2
Turkey	2
Belgium	1
Chile	1
Denmark	1
Germany	1
Hungary	1
Lithuania	1
Estonia	1
Mexico	1
Montenegro	1
Slovenia	1
Total	48
