= Naglite =

Naglite gang
- Years active: 2008-2009
- Territory: Bulgaria
- Ethnicity: Bulgarians
- Membership: 25-30 members
- Activities: kidnapping for ransom, taking hostages, mutilations

Naglite (nag-lee-te) (Bulgarian: Наглите), literally The Insolent Ones, was a Bulgarian criminal group involved in more than ten high-profile kidnappings in 2008–09. They asked for ransoms of several hundred thousand euros in each case, and in the event of delay or insufficient payment, cut fingers off their victims. In a December 2009 police action code-named "Naglite", more than 25 people were arrested in several Bulgarian cities.

Naglite kept their victims blindfolded and none managed to see any of the kidnappers' faces. Nine people were brought to trial in 2010, four of whom were found guilty in April 2012, and again in 2014 by the Supreme Court of Cassation. They were convicted for a total of eight kidnappings and one attempted kidnapping. Three of them got an 18-year sentence and one a ten-year sentence.

== See also ==
- Bulgarian mafia
