= Kiro Gligorov =

1st president of Macedonia

- Киро Глигоров
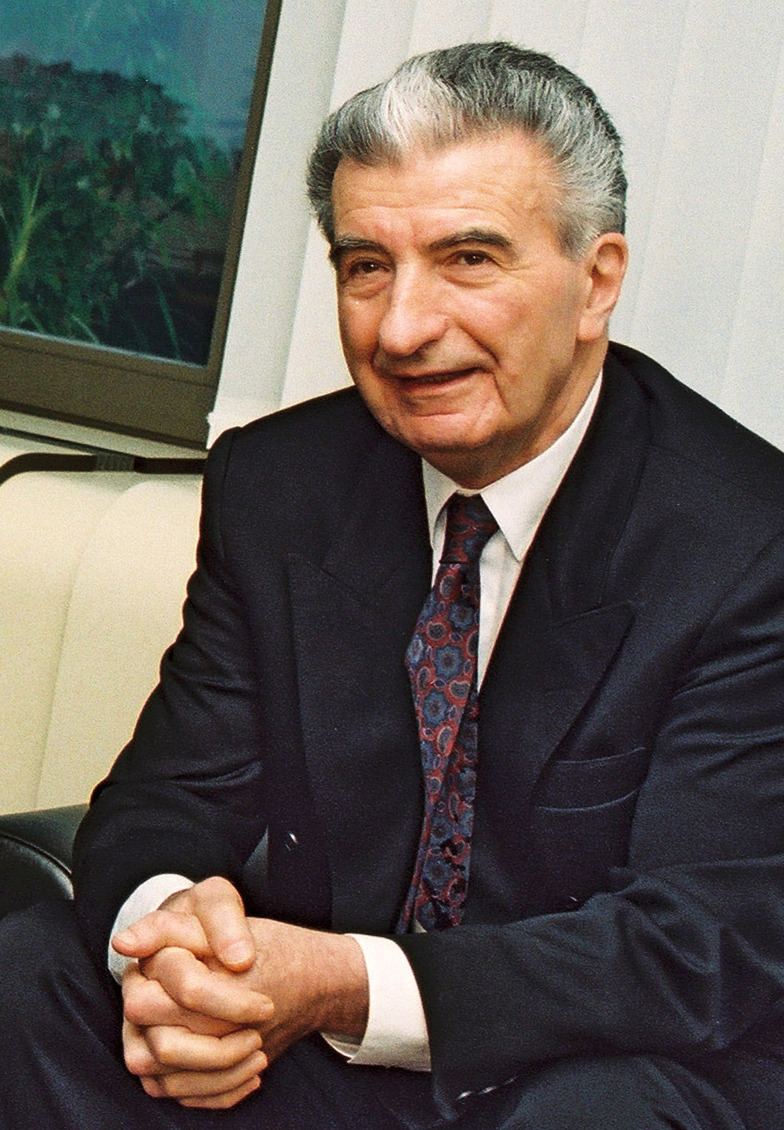
- Gligorov in 1993

President of Macedonia (Note: Formerly President of the Socialist Republic of Macedonia)
- In office 27 January 1991 – 19 November 1999
- Prime Minister: Nikola Kljusev; Branko Crvenkovski; Ljubčo Georgievski
- Vice President: Ljubčo Georgievski (1991) (Note: Ljubčo Georgievski was Macedonia's only vice president in 1991.)
- Preceded by: Vladimir Mitkov (as President of the SR Macedonia)
- Succeeded by: Boris Trajkovski

President of the Federal Assembly of Yugoslavia
- In office 15 May 1974 – 15 May 1978
- Preceded by: Mijalko Todorović
- Succeeded by: Dragoslav Marković

Personal details
- Born: 3 May 1917 Štip, Bulgarian-occupied Serbia
- Died: 1 January 2012 (aged 94) Skopje, Macedonia
- Citizenship: Yugoslav/Bulgarian/Macedonian
- Party: LCY/LCM (1940s–1991); SDSM (from 1991)
- Spouse: Nada Misheva (m. 1943; died 2009)
- Children: 3, including Vladimir

Kiro Gligorov (Macedonian: Киро Глигоров, pronounced [ˈkirɔ ˈɡliɡɔrɔf]; 3 May 1917 – 1 January 2012) was a Macedonian and Yugoslav statesman, economist, and politician who served as the first president of the Republic of Macedonia (now North Macedonia) from 1991 to 1999. He was born and raised in Štip, where he was also educated. He continued his education in Skopje and graduated in law in Belgrade. During World War II in Yugoslav Macedonia, he worked as a lawyer and participated in the partisan resistance. By the end of the war, he was an organiser of the Anti-fascist Assembly for the National Liberation of Macedonia, the predecessor of the Socialist Republic of Macedonia as a federal Yugoslav state.

After the war, he served in various positions in Yugoslavia. For decades, he was a high-ranking official and an economist there. Prior to the breakup of Yugoslavia, Gligorov was an adviser for Ante Marković's market reform plan. Gligorov later played a pivotal role in Macedonia's peaceful secession from Yugoslavia and its international recognition. In 1995, he survived an assassination attempt, of which the perpetrators have not been found. For his role in its independence and political development, international researchers and the Macedonian public regard him as the father of the Macedonian state.

== Early life ==
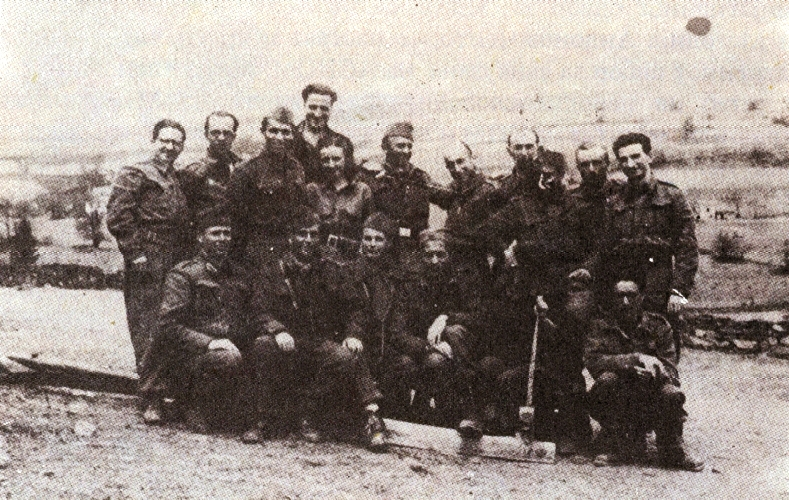
Gligorov (top right) with other members of the General Staff of the Macedonian Partisans on Kozjak, c. 1944

Kiro Gligorov (Note: According to the news sources Novinite and The Independent, his birth surname was Panchev. During the Serbian rule of Vardar Macedonia, his surname was allegedly Grigorović or Gligorović. Later his surname was changed to Gligorov or Grigorov, but during the Bulgarian rule of Vardar Macedonia in World War II, he was known as Kiril Blagoev Grigorov.) was born in Štip on 3 May 1917, in the Bulgarian occupation zone of Serbia (now North Macedonia) during World War I, where he received his initial education. According to the news source Novinite, his father was a craftsman, and his mother was a housewife. Gligorov completed his secondary education in Skopje and later graduated from the University of Belgrade's Law School. Before World War II, he participated in the Macedonian communist student movement. When he was twenty, he was arrested by the Royal Yugoslav authorities for his political opposition to the Kingdom of Yugoslavia, but was released afterwards.

After the defeat of Yugoslavia by Axis forces in 1941, Gligorov returned to Skopje (then annexed by Bulgaria), where he worked as a lawyer until 1943. In 1942, Gligorov was arrested by Bulgarian police on the accusation that he was a pro-Serbian communist. He was released on the orders of Skopje Mayor Spiro Kitinchev, who guaranteed that he was a trustworthy Bulgarian citizen, of ethnic Bulgarian origin. During World War II in Yugoslav Macedonia, he joined the partisans and participated in the resistance. In 1943, he became a member of the Action National Liberation Committee (ANOK), a group of the Communist Party of Macedonia which advocated for a United Macedonia. Along with other communist activists and activists of the group, he saw the Macedonian Question as a pan-Balkan issue and its solution in the creation of a Balkan Federation. Afterwards he became a member of the League of Communists of Yugoslavia (LCY), Anti-Fascist Council for the National Liberation of Yugoslavia (AVNOJ) and Antifascist Assembly of the National Liberation of Macedonia (ASNOM). In ASNOM, he served as a secretary of the Initiative committee for its organisation and a finance commissioner in its presidium. On 2 August 1944, he took part in the first session of ASNOM as a delegate.

== Politics ==
=== Yugoslavia ===
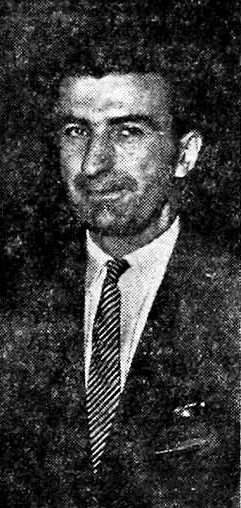
Gligorov in 1965

After World War II, Gligorov moved to Belgrade. Between 1945 and 1947, he held the office of Assistant Secretary General of the Presidency of the Government of the Federal People's Republic of Yugoslavia. He then served as Assistant Minister of Finance from 1947 to 1952. After this year, he held several positions: Assistant Chairman of the Economic Council of the Government of the Federal People's Republic of Yugoslavia from 1952 to 1953, deputy director of the Federal Bureau of Economic Planning from 1953 to 1955, and Secretary of Economy - Coordinator in the Federal Government in 1956.

As a finance minister, he advanced early Yugoslav economic reform. Gligorov supervised the shift from a centrally planned economy to the enduring Yugoslav worker's councils. Managers and banks, rather than the state, would ensure budgetary discipline, even if this might bring the former into conflict with the workers they were supposed to represent.

Under his predecessor's administration, companies had found themselves starved for capital, and misappropriated social insurance funds to purchase necessary improvements. Gligorov hoped that the shift to a market system would temporarily reduce consumption of wage goods to a sustainable level, while also stimulating investment into their production. Cuts in public expenditures attempted to release working capital to manufacturers, and a devalued Yugoslav dinar should improve their export competitiveness.

He and fellow Yugoslav politician Boris Kidrič established Ekonomska politika (Economic policy) in 1952, a Belgrade weekly newspaper, with the aim of promoting market socialism as an alternative to Soviet-style central planning. The newspaper became very influential, particularly among large Yugoslav firms, who were among its subscribers and supporters.

In the 1960s, he had the reputation of being a liberal economist and politician who wanted to implement market-oriented reforms. Along with another Macedonian politician Krste Crvenkovski, he spoke out in favour of decentralisation. He thought that republican control over federal policy making was necessary. Gligorov was the Finance Minister of Yugoslavia from 1962 to 1967. In 1965, he was the co-creator of a marketisation program which was never implemented, because the plan was considered too liberal by Yugoslav leader Josip Broz Tito. In this period, he was also a close collaborator of Tito.

He and his son Vladimir Gligorov in the 1970s published articles in the newspaper Ekonomska politika along with other reform-oriented economists, journalists, managers, and politicians such as Dragiša Bošković, Ljubomir Madžar, Ante Marković, Jože Mencinger, Stjepan Mesić, Milutin Mitrović, Marko Nikezić, Latinka Perović, Žarko Puhovski, Dragan Veselinov, and Veselin Vukotić, most of whom influenced Yugoslav economic and political thinking. Gligorov held various other high-ranking positions in the political establishment of the Socialist Federal Republic of Yugoslavia, including as a member of both the Yugoslav state presidency and the party presidency (for the 9th and 10th electoral terms), as well as President of the Assembly of the Socialist Federal Republic of Yugoslavia from 15 May 1974 to 15 May 1978. In the 1980s, Gligorov was a critic of the subjective causes of the Yugoslav economic difficulties. He opined that the difficulties stemmed from "suppressing market laws and operating in a subjectivist way in which social and economic goals and plans were formulated not on the basis of our realistic possibilities, but rather on what our Socialist society would like to achieve." In 1989, he was an adviser for Ante Marković's economic reform plan, which consisted of economic liberalisation, privatisation, the devaluation of the Yugoslav dinar and its pegging to the German mark, making it convertible.

=== Macedonia ===
He returned to Skopje in 1989. In February 1990, he joined the Macedonian Forum for Preparation of a Macedonian National Program. Gligorov actively participated in the work of this forum, along with Vladimir Gligorov, which discussed the status of the Yugoslav Federation and the Socialist Republic of Macedonia. In a secret vote for the presidency at the parliament on 19 January 1991, he did not receive a two-thirds majority, with the Internal Macedonian Revolutionary Organization – Democratic Party for Macedonian National Unity (VMRO-DPMNE) voting against him and Party for Democratic Prosperity (PDP) abstaining. Following the promulgation of the Declaration of Sovereignty of the State on 25 January, an initiative by a group of prominent liberal politicians and intellectuals called the "Young Lions" and the change of VMRO-DPMNE's stance regarding him, Gligorov was elected as the president of SR Macedonia by a large majority in the Macedonian Assembly on 27 January, succeeding Vladimir Mitkov. Ljubčo Georgievski, then the leader of VMRO-DPMNE, was elected to serve as the vice president of Macedonia, but he resigned from that position in October 1991, complaining that he and his party were politically marginalised, despite being the largest political faction. Gligorov dedicated himself to the realisation of a three-point plan: Yugoslavia's preservation through a peaceful resolution of the crisis; the creation of a parliamentary democracy with the adoption of a new constitution and the promotion of national minorities' rights.

On 7 March, he entrusted the mandate to Nikola Kljusev to form the first government. In the same year, Gligorov along with Alija Izetbegović put forward the idea of a "Yugoslav confederation" (which was strongly supported by the international community), but it was rejected by the other states of Yugoslavia. Thus his policy of preserving Yugoslavia as a confederation failed. When it became clear that Yugoslavia was being torn apart, Gligorov and the other leaders decided to initiate a referendum for independence on 8 September 1991. Many citizens ended up opting for independence, although the referendum was also boycotted by many members of the ethnic Serb and Albanian communities in the country. Under his rule, Macedonia became the only state which seceded from Yugoslavia peacefully. Gligorov worked towards gaining international recognition of Macedonia.

Domestically, Gligorov faced the challenge of finding a balance between two opposing political forces - the ethnic Macedonian VMRO-DPMNE and the ethnic Albanian PDP. He tried to balance the exclusionary demands of the nationalists with the inclusionary demands of the ethnic Albanian parties. Gligorov was of the opinion that Albanians, a substantial ethnic group in the country, would always have a share in the governing of Macedonia and he firmly supported power-sharing with them. After Kljusev's government failed to secure international recognition in 1992, he asked Georgievski to form a new government, but he failed. Gligorov then gave the mandate to Branko Crvenkovski, who formed a coalition government, which also included two ethnic Albanian parties such as the Party for Democratic Prosperity and National Democratic Party. According to Andrew Rossos, he monitored Crvenkovski and the leaders of the ethnic Albanian parties as they worked together to resolve issues that divided ethnic Macedonians and Albanians. While he was considered by Macedonians as a symbol of the state, many Albanians perceived him as having failed them by not supporting their demands. According to Abdurahman Aliti, former leader of PDP, Gligorov was a leading opponent to the inclusion of demands from the "Declaration for the Equal Rights of the Albanians in Macedonia" into the constitution. Other Albanians suggested that his influence on inter-ethnic stability in Macedonia was negative because he avoided addressing issues between Albanians and Macedonians.

Economically, he was leading Macedonia towards full economic privatisation, while also trying to reach agreements with international financial institutions to receive funds for the economic transition. In 1992, he successfully negotiated the withdrawal of the Yugoslav People's Army (JNA) from Macedonian soil. Due to concerns of the Yugoslav Wars spilling over into Macedonia, he requested the presence of UN peacekeepers, which were deployed later. As a result of the Macedonia naming dispute, the Republic of Macedonia was admitted into the United Nations under the reference "the former Yugoslav Republic of Macedonia." Gligorov delivered his first speech before the General Assembly of the United Nations on 7 April 1993. In the general election, he was re-elected President of the Republic by a majority of votes, on 16 October 1994. On 12 September 1995, he signed the Interim Accord for the normalisation of relations with Greece at the United Nations Headquarters. On 2 October, in Belgrade, he signed a recognition agreement with the Federal Republic of Yugoslavia. In 1998, Georgievski became the prime minister of Macedonia. The election for Gligorov's successor took place only a few days before the end of his term. He served as the president until 19 November 1999 and was succeeded by Boris Trajkovski. Following his presidency, he retired from politics.

== Assassination attempt ==
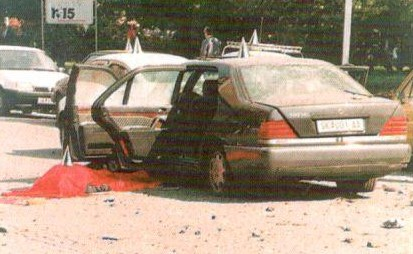
Gligorov's presidential car after the assassination attempt

On 3 October 1995, Gligorov was the target of a car bomb assassination attempt in Skopje. Disobeying instructions from his security advisers to sit in the back seat of his presidential car, he sat next to his driver. While en route from his residence to his office, the car was blown up by an explosion from a parked vehicle, killing his driver and a passer-by, as well as injuring several other passers-by and his security officer. Gligorov was seriously injured and was immediately transported to the hospital. The parked car contained an explosive which was activated remotely. Two persons in their mid-twenties were arrested immediately after the incident.

An investigation into the assassination attempt was initiated and police experienced in terrorism investigations from Britain, United States, Greece and Germany also came to Macedonia to participate. There have been no suspects determined and no progress has been made in the investigation. However, there have been short-lived speculations as to who could be the culprits. Shortly after the bombing, the Minister of Internal Affairs Ljubomir Frčkovski publicly claimed that "a powerful multinational company from a neighbouring country" was behind the assassination attempt, with the Macedonian media pointing at the Bulgarian Multigroup and the Serbian Secret Service as possible suspects. During a meeting between Multigroup head Iliya Pavlov and Gligorov in Ohrid, Pavlov assured Gligorov that his organisation was not involved.

Gligorov was incapacitated until 17 November 1995. He became permanently blind in one eye and was facially scarred as a result of the attack. Stojan Andov was acting president during Gligorov's recuperation. After several months of treatment, on 10 January 1996, Gligorov returned to his presidency.

== Personal life and death ==
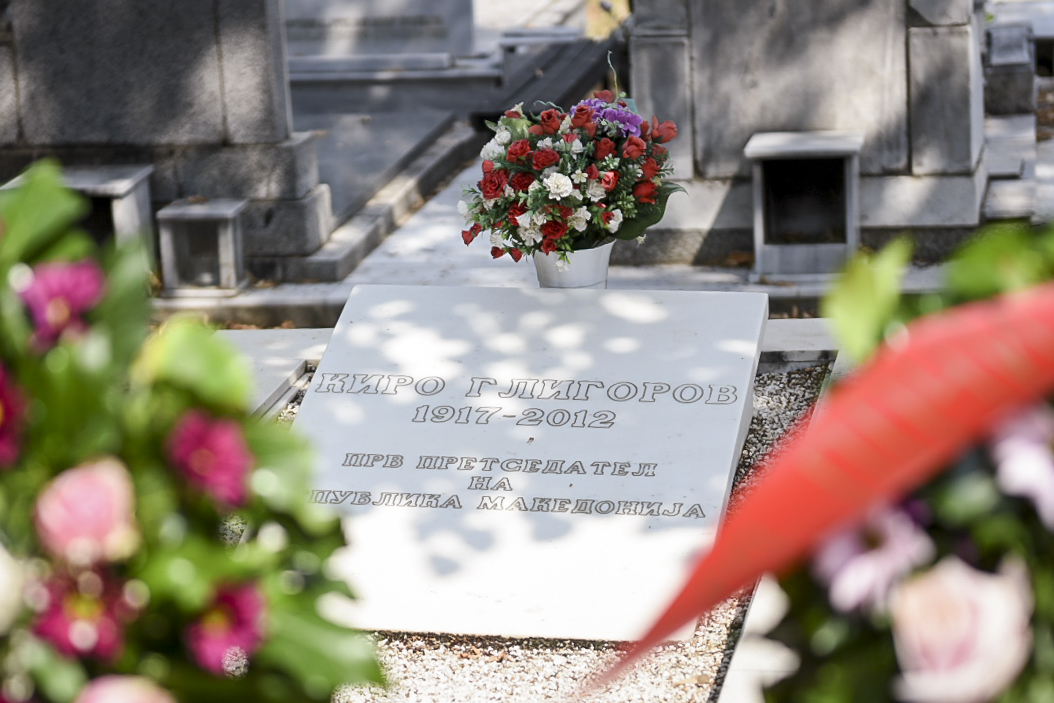
Gligorov's grave at the Butel cemetery in Skopje.

In October 1943, Gligorov married Nada Misheva, who died in 2009. They had one son and two daughters. His son, Vladimir Gligorov, was one of the founders of the Democratic Party in Serbia. Mihailo Apostolski was his brother-in-law through marriage with his sister Cveta. After his retirement from politics, he authored several memoirs and founded the Kiro Gligorov Foundation to publish his works, maintain his archives and serve as a think tank with an interest in studying the development of multi-ethnic societies. In an interview for Vjesnik on 22 March 2001, he dismissed the Albanian demands for greater rights by claiming that they already had sufficient rights, as well as the need for the Albanian language to be declared an official language in areas where few Albanians live. He also supported a military solution to the insurgency in Macedonia. From 2004 to 2005, he was a member of the international commission on the Balkans, headed by former Italian prime minister Giuliano Amato.

In response to Macedonian political and diaspora organisations' claims of direct descent to Alexander the Great, Gligorov stated several times that the ethnic Macedonians are unrelated to the ancient Macedonians, as well as that they are a South Slavic people. In an interview with the Toronto Star on 15 March 1992, he said: "We are Macedonians but we are Slav Macedonians. That's who we are! We have no connection to Alexander the Great and his Macedonia. The ancient Macedonians no longer exist, they had disappeared from history long time ago. Our ancestors came here in the 5th and 6th century (AD)." Among his associates and international researchers, he earned the nickname "the Fox" due to his political acumen and diplomatic skill. International researchers also saw him as a moderate politician.

Kiro Gligorov was the oldest Macedonian political official. In November 1999, when his second presidential term ended, he was 82 years old. Gligorov died at the age of 94 on 1 January 2012 in Skopje, in his sleep. At his own request, the funeral was private with only his closest family in attendance. Some high-ranking officials and academics, such as then Macedonian president Gjorge Ivanov and Chief of General Staff Gorančo Koteski, came to pay their respects beforehand. He was buried in Butel Municipality, Skopje.

== Memoirs ==
Gligorov authored the following memoirs:

- Македонија е сè што имаме (Makedonija e se što imame; English: Macedonia is all we have; 2000)
- Атентат - ден потоа (Atentat - den potoa; English: Assassination - the day after; 2002)
- Виорни времиња, Република Македонија – реалност на Балканот (Viorni vreminja, Republika Makedonija – realnost na Balkanot; English: Stormy times, Republic of Macedonia – a reality in the Balkans; 2004)
- Сите југословенски (стопански) реформи (Site jugoslovenski (stopanski) reformi; English: All Yugoslav (economic) reforms; 2006)

== Honours and legacy ==
Gligorov won numerous international awards and recognitions for his successful, constructive management and regulation of the international relations of the Macedonian state. Following a speech at the University of Pittsburgh in the United States, he was awarded an honorary doctorate on 21 September 1997. He was awarded the Mediterranean Peace Prize on 5 January 1998 in Naples. In 2005, he became the first person to be awarded with the Republic of Macedonia's highest honour; the Order of the Republic of Macedonia. In 2011, he was awarded the Lifetime Achievement Award from the United Macedonian Diaspora.

Other honours Gligorov received include:

- (Socialist Federal Republic of Yugoslavia) Order of the Yugoslav Star with Sash (Unknown date)
- (Socialist Federal Republic of Yugoslavia) Order of Brotherhood and Unity with golden wreath (Unknown date)
- (Socialist Federal Republic of Yugoslavia) Order of Labour with red flag (Unknown date)
- Grand Decoration of Honour in Silver with Sash of the Decoration of Honour for Services to the Republic of Austria (1968)
- (North Macedonia) Order of the Republic of Macedonia (2005)
- (Russia) Jubilee Medal "65 Years of Victory in the Great Patriotic War 1941–1945" (2010)

In April 2012, SDSM proposed the introduction of a state award named "Kiro Gligorov", which was rejected by VMRO-DPMNE and Democratic Union for Integration (DUI) in July. On 14 June, the council of the City of Skopje (with a VMRO-DPMNE and DUI majority) decided to rename the boulevard "Vojvodina" after him. After the 2017 local elections, SDSM's Štip mayor Blagoj Bočvarski initiated the creation of a memorial room in his honour, which was opened in July 2018. In 2017, he was posthumously honoured with the Order "Saint Nicholas" (St. Nikola) by the Municipality of Štip. A statue of him is present on the Monument to the Presidium of ASNOM. In 2019, an elementary school in Kapištec was named after him, with a bust placed in the yard of the school in 2024.

== Notes ==
Political offices
Preceded by Vladimir Mitkov	President of the SR Macedonia; 1991	Succeeded by Post abolished (himself as President of the Republic of Macedonia)
Preceded by post created (himself as President of the SR Macedonia)	President of the Republic of Macedonia; 1991–1999	Succeeded by Boris Trajkovski
