= Vasil Iliev =

Bulgarian mobster

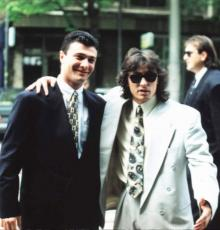
- Vasil Iliev (right) with his brother Georgi in 1994
- Born: January 22, 1965; Kresna, PR Bulgaria
- Died: April 25, 1995 (aged 30); Sofia, Bulgaria
- Cause of death: Assassination by gunshot
- Other names: "The Emperor" (Bulgarian: Императора)
- Citizenship: Bulgarian
- Organization: VIS
- Known for: Crime boss
- Spouse: Marieta Ilieva
- Children: Ivona Ilieva
- Relatives: Georgi Iliev (brother); Mariana Ilieva (sister)

Vasil Iliev (Bulgarian: Васил Илиев; January 22, 1965 – April 25, 1995) was a Bulgarian mobster, businessman and wrestler. Iliev is considered to have been the most powerful gangster in the Balkans during his time.

== Background ==
Vasil Iliev was born in 1965 in Kyustendil, Bulgaria. He grew to be a very successful wrestler, becoming a national champion and heading the country's wrestling federation.

== Criminal career ==
Iliev left Bulgaria for Czechoslovakia, looking for a better future. There he met Ivo Karamanski, who was the ringleader of the Bulgarian mafia abroad, involved in car thefts, armed robberies and contract killings. 7-8 months after his arrival, Vasil Iliev was arrested, together with his friend nicknamed "Drobeca". He spent 2 months in a Czech prison on charges of robbery, which were never proven.

After being released from prison, he was forced to leave Czechoslovakia and in 1988 he went to Hungary, where, together with Ivo Karamanski, they stole cars and committed fraud with currency, gold, etc. Eventually, he made a substantial amount of money and went back to Bulgaria in 1990, where, a year later, he set up VIS (standing for Vyarnost, Investitsii, Sigurnost). The company's official business was in insurance and security, but this was really a front for criminal activity including extortion, selling stolen cars and contract killings and so on. The company was declared illegal in 1994, but its activities continued under VIS-2, yet another front for Iliev's criminal empire.

Iliev later made millions smuggling petroleum into Serbia during the UN-imposed embargo. By this time, Iliev was arguably the most powerful crime boss in the Balkans.

== Death ==
Vasil Iliev was murdered on April 25, 1995, in Sofia. Unidentified gunmen opened fire on his Mercedes-Benz as he left his favorite restaurant Club Mirage, after they had created a fake automobile accident to seal off the road. The incident was so high profile, that the Minister of the Interior arrived at the crime scene in minutes. Iliev's bodyguards, who were traveling in a separate car heavily armed, were unharmed.

The next boss of VIS was his brother Georgi Iliev. He was shot dead by a suspected sniper in Sunny Beach, Bulgaria, a little more than 10 years after his brother.

== See also ==
- List of unsolved murders
