= Yvan Ylieff =

Belgian politician (born 1941)

- Born: 8 March 1941 (age 85); Verviers, Liège, Belgium
- Occupation: politician

Yvan Ylieff (Bulgarian: Иван Илиев, Ivan Iliev; born 8 March 1941) is a Belgian politician of the Francophone Socialist Party.

Ylieff was born in Verviers, Liège, to a Bulgarian emigrant family. He graduated in history before engaging in politics. In 1973, he was elected mayor of the municipality of Dison, a position he held until 2018. From 1974 to 1995, he was a member of Belgian Chamber of Representatives, the lower house of the Belgian Federal Parliament. In 1988–1989, he was a Minister of National Education of Belgium; from 1989 to 1992, he served as the French Community of Belgium's Minister of Culture and Higher Education. In 1995–1999, he was federal Minister of Scientific Policy and from 1999 to 2003 he was Government Commissioner of Scientific Issues.
