= Vladimir Gligorov =

Macedonian and Yugoslav economist (1945–2022)

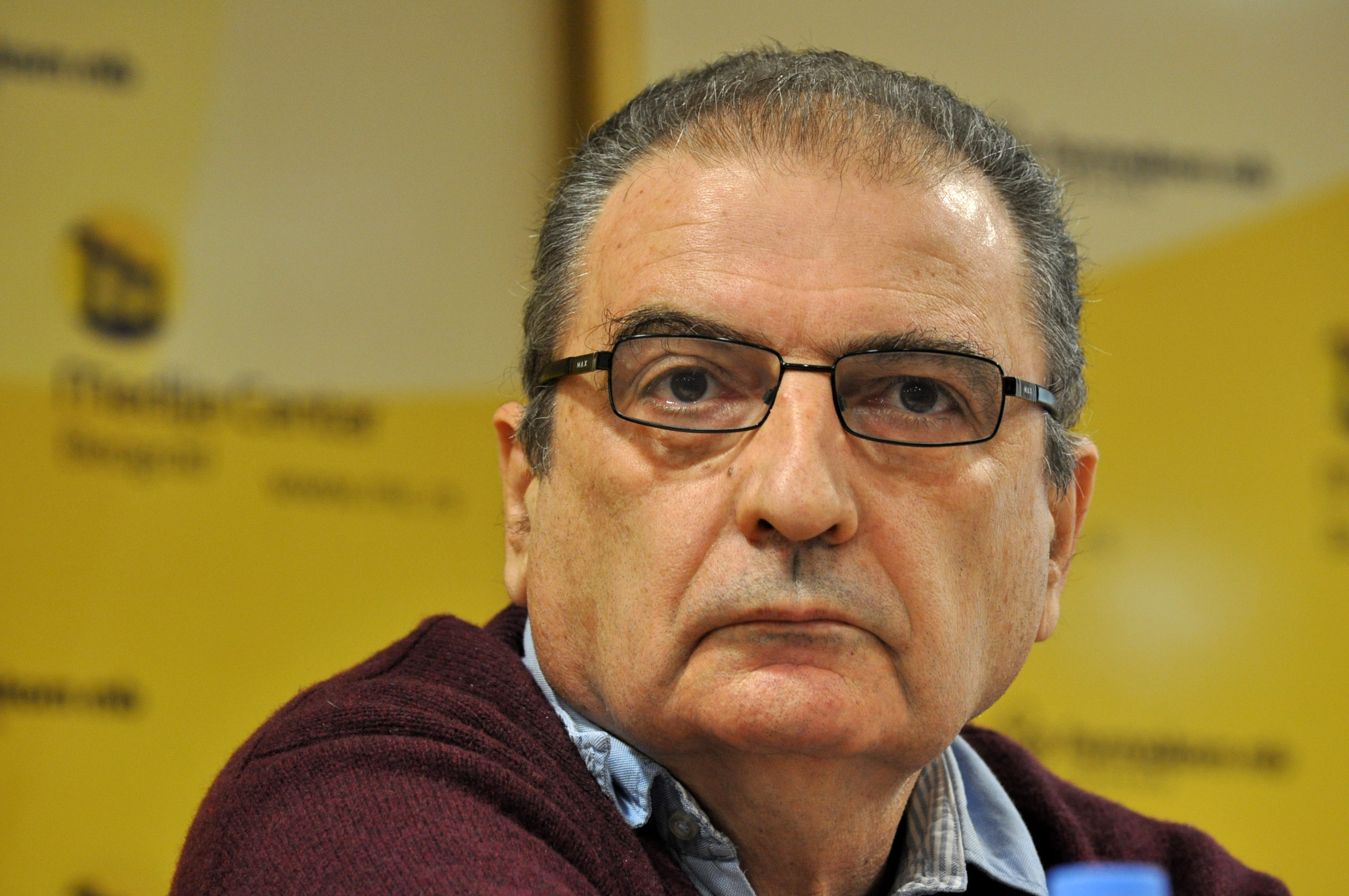
Vladimir Gligorov

Vladimir Gligorov (Macedonian and Serbo-Croatian: Владимир Глигоров; 24 September 1945 – 27 October 2022) was a Macedonian and Yugoslav economist, political analyst and liberal public intellectual. He was a member of the Founding Committee of the Democratic Party in Serbia in December 1989. He was the son of the first President of the Republic of Macedonia, Kiro Gligorov.

== Life ==
Gligorov was born in 1945 in Belgrade, DF Yugoslavia, as the son of Kiro Gligorov and Nada Gligorova. He earned his master's degree at the Columbia University and the University of Belgrade, working subsequently at both institutions as an assistant professor. At the University of Belgrade he worked at the Faculty of Political Sciences. In the 1970s, he published articles in the Belgrade weekly newspaper Ekonomska politika (Economic policy), which had the aim of promoting socialist market economy as an alternative to Soviet-style centrally planned economy. In 1990, he actively participated in the Macedonian Forum for Preparation of a Macedonian National Program (which discussed the status of the Yugoslav Federation and the Socialist Republic of Macedonia), along with his father. Gligorov co-founded the political party Democratic Party (DS) in Serbia. Due to a dispute following the attempted nomination of Tomislav Karađorđević as the party's presidential candidate in the 1990 elections, he left DS. He cooperated with the Institute of Economic Sciences in Belgrade until 1991. Gligorov was a Senior Research Associate at The Vienna Institute for International Economic Studies, while also advising Macedonian president Branko Crvenkovski. He worked as a lecturer at the University of Vienna and professor at the University of Graz. He was a Visiting Fellow at George Mason University, University of Virginia, Uppsala University and Institut für die Wissenschaften vom Menschen.

Gligorov died in Vienna, Austria, on 27 October 2022, at the age of 77.
