= Bulgarian mafia =

Bulgarian series of organized crime elements

- Българска мафия
- Founded: Early 1990s
- Founding location: Bulgaria
- Years active: 1990s–present
- Territory: Primarily Bulgaria, but also active throughout Europe.
- Ethnicity: Bulgarians, Pomaks
- Criminal activities: Arms trafficking, drug trafficking, human trafficking, money laundering, contract killing, murder, racketeering, extortion, bribery, assault, car theft, prostitution, fraud
- Allies: Russian mafia
- Rivals: Turkish mafia
- Notable members: List of members

The Bulgarian mafia or Bulgarian organized crime (Bulgarian: Българска мафия, romanized: Bŭlgarska mafiya) also known as Mutri (Мутри), are the general terms used for criminal organizations based in Bulgaria and composed of ethnic Bulgarians. They are considered one of the strongest mafia groups in Europe and the Balkans, whilst also being significant on an international scale.

Bulgarian organized crime groups are involved in various types of crimes, most often: drug trade and trafficking, arms smuggling, cigarettes, human trafficking, prostitution, illegal trafficking in antiques, extortion (most often under the guise of bogus security and insurance companies).

== History ==
See also: History of Bulgaria since 1989

Much of the post-Communist Bulgarian mafia originates from the professional sportsmen and especially the wrestlers of the Communist period (1944–1989). The Iliev brothers, Krasimir "Big Margin" Marinov and Iliya Pavlov were all students of the school for future champions "Olympic Hopes" (Bulgarian: "Олимпийски надежди").

In post-1990 Bulgaria, the word борец ("wrestler") came to denote a mafia man (a common synonym is мутра (mutra), literally "mug, or mean mug"). The image of the Bulgarian "mug", including a sturdy muscular build, a black suit, sunglasses, a shaved head, and golden jewellery, became synonymous with the so-called Bulgarian "transition" (to market economy). These wrestlers were also known to own expensive cars with license plates with double numbers so that strangers would recognize their status as elite criminals.

The wrestlers came to control much of Bulgarian business, so the word "businessman" acquired similar undertones. The wrestlers also infiltrated Bulgarian politics (it was often alleged that SIC and VIS were connected to the two main parties of the 1990s, the Bulgarian Socialist Party and the Union of Democratic Forces, respectively). As the UDF government (1997–2001) made the registration of the criminal insurance businesses more difficult, much of their networks and personnel were integrated into existing legal insurance firms, while at the same time the principal bosses moved the focus of their attention to smuggling, trade and privatization.

During the government of National Movement Simeon II (2001–2005), assassinations became especially common. Throughout the Post-Communist period, evidence has often surfaced to show the close ties between the criminal networks and politicians and officials. UDF chief prosecutor Ivan Tatarchev allegedly recreated together with Ivo Karamanski, NMS-II finance minister Milen Velchev was photographed playing cards with Ivan "The Doctor" Todorov, and BSP interior minister Rumen Petkov negotiated with the shadowy "Galev brothers".

== Organized crime groups and activities ==
Bulgarian organised crime traces its roots to the 1960s, with import-export companies such as Kintex (owned by Bulgaria's secret police- the State Security agency) profiting from illegal export of weapons and other contraband goods such as amphetamines and cigarettes to terrorists and political groups in the Middle East and North Africa. Kintex's smuggling activities were covered in the Turkish press and first mentioned in CIA documents following the assassination attempt on pope John Paul II. During the late communist period, figures such as Ilia Pavlov and Ismet Turkmen Shaban "The Big Fatik" were known to have conducted contraband activities and set up smuggling channels across Europe & the Middle East with the aid and protection of Bulgaria's state security.

After the fall of the communist regime in Bulgaria in 1989, it is presumed that the mobsters who dominated Bulgaria's business elites in the 1990s and beyond inherited the smuggling channels created by the former State Security and were in fact puppets of generals and high ranking former members of the secret services such as Lyuben Gotsev. The men "recruited" as direct overseers of Bulgaria's drug trafficking and contraband routes after 1989 were former wrestlers, security personnel, special forces personnel, policemen, low-ranking secret service members and others who were capable of and comfortable with keeping their status through violence. As such, the transition to a market economy in Bulgaria was marked by quick and vast wealth for some, but violence for most, with constant contract killings, clashes, and turf wars between rival crime elements competing for domination over not only Bulgaria's drug trade, but also most sectors and industries within Bulgaria's economy.

In 2020, the Italian police, together with the Bulgarian police, dismantled a Bulgarian gang that operated mainly in the Italian region of Tuscany, but also in Bulgaria. The gang was specialized in theft, and was found responsible for more than 40 thefts in the time period between September 2018 and April 2020. According to the investigations the gang was a well-structured and organized criminal group. Still, according to the Italian police, the Bulgarian mafia is among the most dangerous foreign criminal groups operating in Italy, and it was reported that they would be cooperating with the 'Ndrangheta.

Drug trafficking organizations run by Bulgarian nationals have been investigated in across US, especially in Los Angeles and Tampa. These groups deal with the import of cocaine and multi-thousand doses of ecstasy into the United States. Most members of these were imprisoned in the U.S. There, Bulgarian nationals are identified for falsification of IDs, organized bank fraud, drug trafficking, mortgage fraud, pimping, money laundering, extortion, arms dealing, loan sharking, pornography, credit card fraud and alien smuggling.

== Notable members ==
- Vasil Iliev (Васил Илиев; 1965 - 1995): a.k.a. "The Emperor" (Императора). Founder of VIS1 and VIS2. Iliev was considered the most powerful crime boss in the Balkans during his time.
- Georgi Iliev (Георги Илиев; 1966 - 2005): brother of Vasil Iliev. After his brother's death Georgi becomes head of VIS2.
- Ilia Pavlov (Илия Павлов; 1960–2003): Founder of Multigroup and the wealthiest individual in Bulgaria. He was widely considered to be one of the most powerful bosses of the Bulgarian underworld.
- Konstantin Dimitrov (Константин Димитров; 1970–2003): a.k.a. "Samokovetsa" (Самоковеца). One of the biggest figures in drug trafficking in the Balkans and, connected with the VIS.
- Ivan Todorov (Иван Тодоров; 1964–2006): a.k.a. "The Doctor" (Доктора). One of the biggest Bulgarian smugglers in the mid-1990s. Also among the defendants of the biggest cases for money laundry in Bulgaria.
- Ivo Karamanski (Иво Карамански; 1959–1998): a.k.a. "The Godfather" (Кръстника). A key figure in the Bulgarian underworld in the first years after the fall of communism in the country.
- Rumen Marinov (Румен Маринов; 1963–2003) a.k.a. “The Narcissus” (Нарциса). One of the main partners of Vasil Iliev and co-founder of VIS1, as well as a close friend, business partner and groomsman of Georgi Iliev.
- Milcho Bonev (Милчо Бонев; 1961–2004): a.k.a. "Baj Mile" (Бай Миле). Bonev was one of the founders of SIC. He was believed to be an important link in the drug trafficking and distribution network in the Balkans.
- Krasimir Marinov (Красимир Маринов; born 1964): a.k.a. "Big Margin" (Големия Маргин). One of the founders of a criminal group engaged in drug trafficking, financial fraud, car theft, smuggling, extortion, racketeering and prostitution, using the cover of an official business in the insurance and alcoholic beverage sectors, known as SIC. He is also a co-founder of the company.
- Nikolay Marinov (Николай Маринов; born 1972): a.k.a. "Little Margin" (Малкия Маргин). Brother of Krasimir Marinov and founder with his brother and Mucho Bonev of the SIC.
- Mladen Mihalev (Младен Михалев; born 1964): a.k.a. "Madjo" (Маджо). Considered by the authorities as one of the biggest crime bosses and most prominent underworld figures in Bulgaria in the 2000s.
- Dimitar Zhelyazkov (Димитър Желязков; born 1972): a.k.a. "The eyes" (Митьо Очите). Leader of an organized crime group that engaged in extortion, coercion through threats, arson and drug distribution.
- Zlatomir Ivanov (Златомир Иванов; born 1968): a.k.a. "The Berret" (Баретата). Figure of Bulgarian underworld involved in drug trafficking, human trafficking and murder.

== Contract killings ==
Since the fall of communism in 1989, there have been more than 250 high rank heads mafia-style contract killings in Bulgaria, frequently perpetrated in the centre of the capital, Sofia, in broad daylight. There has been at most 1 conviction in these cases to date, though sources differ. This is frequently blamed on the alleged widespread corruption at all levels of the Bulgarian judicial system including the Prosecutor's Office.

The cost of contract killings carried out by highly professional snipers has been estimated at £5,000-£500,000. The more important one's worth's considered, the more expensive the contract.

Some of the most prominent assassination targets of recent years (in chronological order):

- Vasil Iliev - Ambushed by an unknown killer on his way to Club "Mirage" on 25 April 1995.
- Andrey Lukanov - former Bulgarian prime minister (1990). Killed on 2 October 1996.
- Ivo Karamanski - Shot by a drunk acquaintance at a birthday party in Sofia on 20 December 1998.
- Pantyu Pantev, a.k.a. "Polly" - Drug smuggler, initially affiliated with VIS, later with SIC. He was rumoured to have stolen half a ton of cocaine from the Russian or Colombian mafia. Several assassination attempts, including one with a missile, all attempts for different reasons from different rivals. He was shot dead on the Caribbean island of Aruba on 9 March 2001.
- Iliya Pavlov - Shot dead in front of his office in Sofia on 3 July 2003 (a failed assassination attempt had been made in 1997).
- Konstantin "Samokovetsa" Dimitrov - Shot dead in Amsterdam on 7 December 2003.
- Dimitar Hristov, a.k.a. Mitko the Little One - Shot dead on 4 June 2004 in a cafe together with his bodyguards Kaloyan Savov and Zhivko Mitev by two hitmen disguised as Eastern Orthodox priests.
- Milcho Bonev - He had survived an earlier assassination attempt in September 2001. Bonev was shot dead in broad daylight in a garden-restaurant in Sofia on 20 July 2004 together with five of his bodyguards.
- Georgi Iliev - Shot dead in front of his club at Sunny Beach, Bulgaria on 25 August 2005.
- Anton Miltenov, a.k.a. "The Beak" - Drug smuggler, right-hand man of Konstantin "Samokovetsa" Dimitrov. Shot dead in a popular cafe in the centre of Sofia on 30 October 2005 (together with his co-workers Ivan "The Ghost" Todorov and Nikolay "The Eyeglasses" Dobrev). An earlier attempt on his life had been made on 28 June 2002.
- Ivan Todorov - Shot dead on 22 February 2006. He had survived a previous assassination attempt on 18 April 2003 in which his Mercedes was blown up while driving down a main boulevard in Sofia.
- Georgi Stoev - Former wrestler, connected with VIS and SIC. Had written nine books about Bulgaria's mafia bosses, many of whom he claimed to know personally. Shot dead in Sofia on 7 April 2008.
- Aleksei Petrov - Bulgarian businessman, politician, university professor and an expert at corporate security and antiterrorism. Shot dead in Sofia on 16 August 2023.

=== Other mafia-related assassinations ===
- Georgi Kalapatirov - Chairman of Bulgaria's football team Lokomotiv Plovdiv, shot dead in 1995.
- Georgi Prodanov - Chairman of Bulgaria's football team Lokomotiv Plovdiv, shot dead in 1995.
- Petar Petrov - Chairman of Bulgaria's football team Lokomotiv Plovdiv, shot dead in 1998.
- Nikolai Popov - Chairman of Bulgaria's football team Lokomotiv Plovdiv, shot dead in 2005.
- Alexander Tasev - Chairman of Bulgaria's football team Lokomotiv Plovdiv, shot dead in May 2007.
- Yanko Yankov - Mayor of Elin Pelin, shot dead in January 2007.
- Dimitar Yankov - Chairman of the Municipality Council of the seaside town of Nesebar, shot dead in May 2007.
- Manol Velev - Bulgarian notorious businessman-mobster with close links with the BSP. Murder attempt on 6 November 2007.
- Borislav Georgiev - Director of AtomEnergoRemont, one of the major Bulgarian energy companies. Shot dead in April 2008.
- Petar Lupov - Prominent lawyer, involved in the defense team for a group of shareholders of the former Trakya Bank against DZI Bank. Shot dead on 25 March 2009 in Veliko Tarnovo.
- Bobi Tsankov - Controversial investigative journalist, criminal writer, radio and TV host. Shot dead in downtown Sofia, January 2010.
- Krasimir Kamenov - a.k.a. "Kuro". Businessman linked to a number of high-profile crimes. Shot dead in Cape Town, South Africa in May 2023.

== Judicial prosecution and fight against criminal networks ==
In 2006, the EU dispatched the head of Germany's criminal investigation office Klaus Jansen to assess Bulgaria's progress in fighting organized crime. He concluded that Bulgaria had failed to implement modern principles and methods in the fight against crime, criticising among other things the low commitment of the country's police force to combat organized crime. The report further observed that "indictments, prosecutions, trials, convictions and deterrent sentences remain rare in the fight against high-level corruption" and described efforts to fight crime as "a total mess". Jensen also suggested that European police information passed to Sofia could end up with criminals. In a reaction to the report, Interior Minister Rumen Petkov described the findings as exaggerated and protested against Jansen's way of presenting the situation in Bulgaria which, in his words, demonstrated his incompetence.

In the Bulgarian judicial system, the Prosecutor General is elected by a qualified majority of two-thirds from all the members of the Supreme Judicial Council and is appointed by the President of the Republic. The Supreme Judicial Council is in charge of the self-administration and organisation of the Judiciary.

List of Prosecutor Generals in Bulgaria post-1989:

- Ivan Geshev - in office since 18 December 2019
- Sotir Tsatsarov
- Boris Velchev
- Nikola Filchev
- Ivan Tatarchev
- Martin Gounev

== See also ==
- Multigroup
- Naglite
- VIS

General:

- Crime in Bulgaria
