= Plamen Iliev =

Plamen Iliev may refer to:

- Plamen Iliev (footballer, born 1991), Bulgarian football goalkeeper
- Plamen Iliev (footballer, born 1994), Bulgarian football winger
