= Ivo Karamanski =

Bulgarian mobster

- Born: November 29, 1959; Sofia, PR Bulgaria
- Died: December 20, 1998 (aged 39); Sofia, Bulgaria
- Other name: "The Godfather"
- Occupation: Criminal
- Spouse: Galina Lukanovska
- Children: 3 daughters (legitimate); 1 son (illegitimate)

Ivo Karamanski (Bulgarian: Иво Карамански; November 29, 1959 in Sofia, Bulgaria – December 20, 1998) was a reputed Bulgarian mobster.

== Biography ==
His life was difficult from the very beginning with his mother dying when he was only four years old. In 1981 he became National and Balkan rowing champion. A colorful underworld character in the Bulgarian Mafia, he was reputed to be a killer "who never even shot a gun". His nickname was "the Godfather" and they also called him "Capo di tutti Capi". His personal signature and phrase was "The good boys go to heaven, the bad ones wherever they want (like) to". He was also reportedly an informant for the communist State Security.

During his career, he founded the "Korona-ins" insurance company, and co-owned 20 other small companies.

Karamanski and his bodyguard were gunned down in 1998 in what police termed a drunken quarrel.
