= Dimitar Zhelyazkov =

Bulgarian criminal

Dimitar Zhelyazkov (Bulgarian: Димитър Желязков) (September 19, 1972) is a Bulgarian criminal from Nessebur, known as Mityo Ochite (The Eyes).

== History as a criminal ==
In February 2008 Zhelyazkov admitted to being a drug boss, and pleaded guilty to every charge which was brought against him, by the prosecutor in Burgas. He went further in agreeing to cooperate with prosecutors who were conducting other investigations.

== Imprisoned ==
He was sentenced from 4 to 5 years in prison and his property, amounting to $18,000, was confiscated. After a media uproar concerning preferential treatment for a drug lord, Zhelyazkov was sent to Belene Prison, along the Danube River, on the opposite side of Bulgaria from where Burgas is. On 8 June 2009 it was decided by officials at Belene to transfer Zhelyazkov to a low security facility. He was transported to Kazichene Prison near Sofia, Bulgaria. He was returned later to Belene after becoming involved in a fight with another inmate at Kazichene.
