= Vasil Iliev Security =

Bulgarian criminal organization

VIS
- Founder: Vasil Iliev
- Founding location: Sofia, Bulgaria
- Years active: 1991–2005
- Membership: 2 crime bosses, hundreds members and associates
- Activities: extortion, racketeering, theft, contract killing, murder, drug trafficking, car theft

Vasil Iliev Security, also known as VIS or Vyarnost, Investitsii, Sigurnost, was a criminal organization in Bulgaria dealing in extortion, car theft, drug trafficking and more. Set up in the early 1990s by Vasil Iliev, the company was declared illegal in 1994, but continued operating under the new name of VIS-2.

VIS, along with its rival SIC, was made up primarily of ex-wrestlers, policemen and members of the security apparatus. As well as extortion rackets, the groups also worked in "car insurance" and theft. The capital they earned in the emerging Bulgarian economy of the 1990s allowed them to build huge influence amongst the government.

Vasil Iliev was assassinated on 25 April 1995. His brother Georgi Iliev became the new boss of the company, but was assassinated on 25 August 2005.

== See also ==
- Security Insurance Company
- Bulgarian mafia
