= Security Insurance Company =

Bulgarian crime group

СИК (SIC)
- Founded: 1990s
- Founder: Krasimir Marinov; Nikolay Marinov; Mladen Mihalev
- Founding location: Bulgaria
- Years active: 1990s–present
- Membership: 3 bosses, hundreds members and associates
- Activities: Drug trafficking, financial fraud, car theft, smuggling, extortion, racketeering and prostitution.

Security Insurance Company (SIC) is a Bulgarian criminal group engaged in drug trafficking, financial fraud, car theft, smuggling, extortion, racketeering and prostitution, using the cover of an official business in the insurance and alcoholic beverage sectors. On the other hand, SIC Bulgaria is a private investment company that invests primarily in the insurance and security sectors. It was created and managed by some of the first Bulgarian oligarchs - the Marinov brothers (Krasimir and Nikolay), and Mladen Mihalev.

== Gang war ==
In 2002, the feuds between the SIC employees claimed many victims, two years later a bloody shootout in the center of Sofia ended with six bodies, one of which was that of the crime boss Milcho Bonev. In the summer of 2009, businessman Alexander Zanev, who was known to have connections with politicians from the NMSP, was killed.

== Activities ==
According to sources from the Ministry of Interior, the SIC controls the smuggling of excise goods by sea. In 1995, mafia groups divided the prostitution market, the SIC establishments in Sofia were "Sladak Gryah", "Spartak", "Dama Pika", "Bonita", all owned by Rumen Nikolov, each club pays 50-60 percent of the profits of the structure.

== See also ==
- VIS (criminal organisation)
- Bulgarian Mafia
