= Multigroup =

Defunct Bulgarian business conglomerate

- Type: business conglomerate
- Industry: international trade and logistics
- Headquarters: Bulgaria
- Key people: Iliya Pavlov
- Products: trade in antiques and work of art, trade in gasoline and petroleum products, trade in precious metals and gemstones, grain trade, taking over state property, management of state funds

Multigroup was a business conglomerate in Bulgaria. Its founder is the Bulgarian businessman Iliya Pavlov, who was its leader until his assassination on March 7, 2003. In 1995, the Minister of Internal Affairs of the Republic of Macedonia Ljubomir Frckoski publicly claimed that "a powerful multinational company from neighboring country" was behind the assassination attempt of Kiro Gligorov on 3 October 1995, with the Macedonian media pointing at Multigroup as a suspect. After a meeting of Iliya Pavlov and Gligorov in Ohrid, Pavlov assured the then-President of the Republic of Macedonia that this was false. All investigations were futile.
