= Ilia Pavlov =

Bulgarian businessman

- Born: August 6, 1960; Dolni Bogrov, Kremikovtsi, PR Bulgaria
- Died: March 7, 2003 (aged 42); Sofia, Bulgaria
- Cause of death: Assassination by gunshot
- Occupations: Businessman, Criminal
- Spouse: Darina Pavlova (m.1989–2003)
- Children: 2

Iliya Pavlov Naydenov (Bulgarian: Илия Павлов Найденов; August 6, 1960 – March 7, 2003) was a Bulgarian mobster, oligarch, banker, financier and philanthropist. He was the leader and founder of Multigroup organization and G-13. Throughout his career, he established close ties with members of the Committee for State Security(CSS) and founded Multigroup, an organization infamous for its nefarious activities such as money laundering, extortion, fraud, illegal car purchases and contract killings. Iliya Pavlov also played a critical role during the transition of Bulgaria from Socialism to Democracy by taking advantage of the privatization of the previously state-owned industries. His business conglomerates would buy up the enterprises at record-low prices and either sell them or let them go bankrupt. In this way, Pavlov managed to accumulate a great fortune and was even ranked the eighth richest man in Central and Eastern Europe by the Polish magazine Wprost in 2002. He was said to be worth $US1.5 billion. He was married to Darina Pavlova, who inherited his fortune after his murder.

== Death ==
Pavlov was shot outside his office with a single bullet to the heart by a sniper and died instantly. The day before his death, he had testified in the trial of the accused murderers of Andrey Lukanov, Bulgaria's first prime minister after the fall of communism who died in 1996. Pavlov had claimed that he had no conflict with Lukanov.

No one has been charged in Pavlov's murder and while several possible theories have been put forth the motive is unknown. A previous attempt on Pavlov's life was made in 1997 when a bomb destroyed his car. He was not in it at the time.

In 2010 Pavlov's sister, Slavka Naydenova, and her 8-year-old son were murdered in Dale City, Virginia. A Russian-American woman who was the wife of Naydenova's ex-husband pleaded guilty to the murders. The motive was jealousy.

== Sports career ==
Pavlov was a former Bulgarian wrestling champion who graduated from the National Sports Academy in Sofia.

== See also ==
- List of Bulgarians
- List of unsolved murders (2000–present)
- Bulgarian mafia
