= Vietnamese criminal underworld =

Vietnamese criminal organizations

Vietnamese gangsters in the 1990s with gang bosses such as Dung Hà (2nd from left), Năm Cam (5th from left), and Hải Bánh (3rd from right).

Xã hội đen (chữ Nôm: 社會黰, literally meaning "black societies") is a Vietnamese term used to describe the criminal underworld. The term is believed to have become widely used thanks to Hong Kong TV series and movies about the Chinese secret society of Heishehui (Chinese: 黑社会). An individual who participates in these criminal activities can be called a giang hồ, (Note: derived from the Chinese word 江湖, which means "rivers and lakes") găng-xtơ, (Note: derived from the English word gangsters) côn đồ, (Note: means "thugs") or tội phạm; (Note: means "criminals") while a criminal organization is known as băng đảng or băng nhóm, depending on its scale. They are those whose goal is to make money from illegal and overall immoral activities.

== Crime in Vietnam ==
According to the law of the Socialist Republic of Vietnam, under Clause 1, Article 8 of the 2015 Criminal Code:

A crime means an act that is dangerous for society and defined in Criminal Code, is committed by a person who has criminal capacity of corporate legal entity, whether deliberately or involuntarily, infringes the sovereignty and territorial integrity of the nation, infringes the political regime, economic regime, culture, national defense and security, social order and safety, the lawful rights and interests of organizations, human rights, the lawful rights and interests of citizens, other aspects of socialist law, and leads to criminal prosecution as prescribed by this Code.

Joining a criminal organization is considered to be a "very serious crime" in Vietnam. For example, a person who illegally transported goods or money across the border could "face a penalty of up to 2 years community sentence or 3–24 months' imprisonment;" (Note: Clause 1, Article 189) but the same crime if committed by a member of an organized group would be liable for "a penalty of 2–5 years' imprisonment." (Note: Clause 2.a, Article 189, Criminal Code)

Although the law would also make political groups, such as Việt Tân and DTVNCH, criminal organizations, (Note: Article 108, Criminal Code) they are not part of xã hội đen as their stated aim and genesis is ideological rather than commercial.

== Structure ==
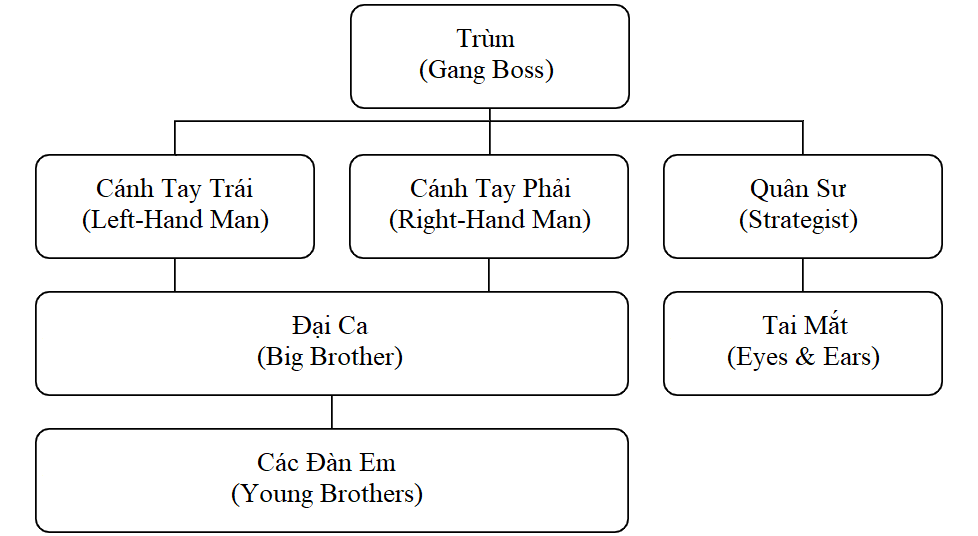

A small group of criminals, băng nhóm, has a simple structure. It is organized loosely with a small number of members. The leader is called đại ca or băng trưởng. They act aggressively and mostly commit crimes such as murder, robbery, theft, and fraud. These small groups may band together to form a larger syndicate or find protectorate from an already existed one.

A larger criminal syndicate, băng đảng, has a clearer, more sustainable organizational structure with long-term operational goals. The leadership can have one or multiple people, but there is one individual at the top known as trùm. Below them is the command level with people who would be in charge of smaller groups within the syndicate. Ordinary members, known as đàn em, are those who directly carry out criminal acts, as well as all tasks assigned by the leaders.

For example, during the 1960s in South Vietnam, there was a powerful gang led by the infamous Đại Cathay, the trùm of his gang and the "Brother of all brothers" (Vietnamese: Đại ca của các đại ca). Along Đại were several members that assisted his leadership: cánh tay trái "H đầu bò" (H the bull head), cánh tay phải "Lâm chín ngón" (Lâm the nine fingers), and quân sư "Hoàng guitar" (Hoàng the guitarist). The gang bosses that submitted to Đại Cathay were Huỳnh Tỳ and Ngô Cái, who were respectively known as "Second Brother" (Note: Vietnamese: Nhị ca) and "Third Brother" (Note: Vietnamese: Tam ca).

== In Vietnam ==
The Golden Triangle is one of the largest opium-producing areas of the world

Vietnamese drug lords control territories in the northwestern provinces. Because Vietnam is located near the Golden Triangle, its heroin trade is concentrated along its borders with Laos and Cambodia. Since 2019, Vietnam has not only become a drug market but also a transit port that criminals use to traffick drugs to other countries.

Meanwhile, Vietnamese illegal trafficking groups control areas in Hồ Chí Minh City. Their networks have been linked to the human-trafficking and human-smuggling markets, the ivory and pangolin-trafficking markets, illicit logging operations, arms trafficking, and drug-trafficking markets.

Name	Active	Operating in	Founder's ethnicity
Black Flag Army	1860s–1885	China–Vietnam border	Zhuang
Bình Xuyên Army	1945–1960	Southeastern Vietnam	Vietnamese
Gangs of the Four Great Kings	1960s–1966 (Đại Cathay); 1960s–1975 (Others)	Sài Gòn-Chợ Lớn	Vietnamese
Tín Mã Nàm's triad	1960s–1975	Chợ Lớn	Chinese
Năm Cam's gang	1962–2001	Hồ Chí Minh City (HCM City)	Vietnamese
Bạch Hải Đường’s robber band	1970–1982	Long Xuyên	Vietnamese
Lâm chín ngón's prison gang	1970–1988 (Note: Before being sentenced to prison, Lâm was a member of Đại Cathay's gang group. After being released, he stopped being a gangster, but was still targeted by Năm Cam as a rival opponent (Năm Cam’s attack on Lâm).)	Chí Hòa Prison	Vietnamese
Khánh Trắng’s so-called "Đồng Xuân Labor Union"	1989–1996	Hà Nội	Vietnamese
Phúc Bồ’s gang [vi]	1990s–1996	Hà Nội	Vietnamese
Phước tám ngón’s gang	1990s–1996	HCM City	Vietnamese
Dung Hà's gang	1990s–2000	Hải Phòng (Note: Hà later tried to expand her influence in HCM City, but was assassinated by Năm Cam)	Vietnamese
Hải Bánh's group	1990s–2001	Hải Phòng, (Note: As part of Dung Hà's gang) later HCM City (Note: As followers of Năm Cam)	Vietnamese

Foreign-based gangs such as the Korean mafia and the Japanese yakuza are also reported to be active in Vietnam.

=== Brief history ===
In 1865, the China-based brigand Black Flag Army crossed the border from Guangxi into northern Vietnam to create a profitable extortion network along the course of the Red River. The group later joined forces with the Qing and the Nguyễn to fight against the French.

In 1945, various groups of gangsters unified into an organization called Bình Xuyên, led by Ba Dương. In the 1920s, Ba Dương had previously been the leader of a coalition of river pirates. In 1949, Bình Xuyên became a legitimate military organization. In 1954, Bình Xuyên controlled nearly the entire supply of opium of Vietnam. In 1955, Bình Xuyên was defeated in the Battle of Saigon and was disbanded.

Saigon in the 1960s saw the rise of four powerful Vietnamese gangs whose leaders are known as the "Four Great Kings" (Vietnamese: Tứ đại thiên vương), and were behind almost all of the criminal activities and rackets within the city:

- Lê Văn Đại (nicknamed "Đại Cathay") was the son of Lê Văn Cự, a member of the Bình Xuyên gang who died in 1946. At the age of 14, he ran away from home and made a living by shining shoes and selling newspapers near a Cathay cinema. He quickly built himself a loyal gang group, defeated his rivals, and became the top of the "Four Great Kings" of Saigon's criminal underworld before 1975.
- Nguyễn Thuận Lai (nicknamed "Huỳnh Tỳ") used to be a gentle and hard-working student who loved poetry. After grade 10, he went out to work and became involved in criminal activities. He rose up to become the most powerful gang boss until 1964, when he and his gang had to submit to Đại Cathay.
- Ngô Văn Cái was known for his skillful martial art. He was considered to be the "Third Brother", after Đại Cathay and Huỳnh Tỳ. He later married and became less involved in criminal activities. Thus, managed to stay out of trouble with the government.
- Nguyễn Kế Thế (nicknamed "Ba Thế") was known to be the person that kicked Đại Cathay down the stairs, provoked a war between the then Tỳ-Cái-Thế kings and Đại Cathay.

Beside the "Four Kings", there was also an infamous Chinese crime boss called Tín Mã Nàm (nicknamed "Mad Horse"). He was considered the "Triad King" (Note: Vietnamese: Vua hắc đạo) of Chợ Lớn and was said to be the second highest-ranking member of Hồng Môn, a triad from China, behind only Hoàng Long ("Yellow Dragon").

In 1964, Đại Cathay's gang and Tín Mã Nàm's triad clashed in a bloody fight. Although Mã Nàm won, the battle caused many people to avoid his casinos and his business sharply declined. Tín Mã Nàm was then forced to call for a negotiation with Đại where he and many of the Chinese gangs in Chợ Lớn decided to give up away the areas between the Nancy market and District 1 to Đại Cathay's gang.

In 1966, Tạ Vinh, a Chinese businessman, was arrested due to some conflicts with the government. Triads in Chợ Lớn and Hong Kong tried to intervene by sending a petition to the embassy of the Republic of Vietnam in Taipei, Taiwan, but failed. Tạ Vinh was publicly executed on March 14.

In November 1966, Đại Cathay was arrested and placed in Phú Quốc Prison. On January 7 1967, Đại and his men escaped from the camp, but when he passed through the front gate, the alarm sounded, alerting the guards surrounding the prison. After being spotted, Đại was chased to the northern part of the island, but the guards never found him and he was never heard from again.

Following 1975 and the reunification of Vietnam, the era of the Four Great Kings of Saigon came to the end. However, this allowed Năm Cam, a former follower of Đại Cathay, to develop a powerful criminal organization which dominated the South. He is said to have gone on a 15-year long killing spree in order to eliminate his rivals, and is considered the "Godfather" of Vietnam.

Meanwhile in the North, four crime bosses also appeared:

- Dương Văn Khánh (nicknamed "Khánh Trắng"), whose group operated in Hanoi under a legal named "Đồng Xuân Labor Union." At its height, Khánh Trắng's organization even received praise from government officials as a model example of an organization that should be replicated. He and his members were finally arrested on 24 May 1996 and Khánh was sentenced to death.
- Nguyễn Thị Phúc (nicknamed "Phúc Bồ") operated in Hanoi, around the Đồng Xuân market. Phúc Bồ occasionally clashed with Khánh Trắng until her arrest in 1996. She was released in 2002.
- Dung Hà, a high-ranking gangster in Haiphong, was considered one of the two greatest mafia bosses of the Vietnamese underworld, along with Năm Cam.
- Hải Bánh, a follower of Dung Hà until 1995 when Hà was temporarily arrested. After that, Hải and some members went to the South and joined Năm Cam's gang.

At one point, both Năm Cam and Dung Hà joined forces to attack Lê Ngọc Lâm (nicknamed "Lâm chín ngón"), another former member of Đại Cathay. In 2000, Dung Hà was assassinated as she tried to expand her operation to Hồ Chí Minh City. In 2001, both Năm Cam and Hải Bánh, along with other gang members were arrested. Cam was executed while Hải was imprisoned until 2022.

== Outside of Vietnam ==
=== In the US ===
- Born to Kill
- Tran Organization

Vietnamese-American gangs had their genesis in southern California, typically committing home invasions and robberies against Vietnamese and other Asian refugee families. The kidnapping of young girls is also common, with many forced into having sex, doing drugs, and committing criminal offenses. Vietnamese gangs are known to be highly mobile, often travelling interstate, perpetrating a variety of criminal acts in a short period of time. They are considered to be less organized but more violent than ethnic Chinese organized crime groups. Ethnic Chinese from Vietnam (sometimes called Viet-ching) often play an important role as members of Vietnamese gangs or as links between Vietnamese and Chinese criminal organizations.

=== In Canada ===
- Red Scorpions

Vietnamese gangs have emerged as dominant and violent criminal organizations in Toronto's Chinatown area, with many of them hired by already-established Chinese triads to work as street enforcers. While for the most part, these gangs have businesses within their community, it seems that they are looking to expand their activities to the outside business community. There are three levels in Vietnamese criminal organizations. First is the organized crime level representing the geographically anchored hierarchy, second is the street gang level which carries out directions from the organized crime level leadership, and last is the action-set which consists of young males aspiring to gain membership in the street gangs.

=== In Australia ===
- 5T (gang)

There has been concern expressed about the growth of ethnic Vietnamese criminal groups in Australia for a decade. Vietnamese gangs are heavily armed and have established links with Australian crime figures. They are mainly involved in crimes against their own community including murder, extortion, robbery and petty drug dealing, with standovers and extortion being the most common. Vietnamese criminal organizations are known to organize heroin shipments, either independently of or in association with established Chinese heroin trafficking operations. An increasing amount of heroin coming into Australia appears to have been transhipped through Vietnam. Australian police have significant difficulties in counteracting Vietnamese organised crime due to a lack of Vietnamese police officers, consequent language barriers, and a common mistrust of government agencies by migrants from Vietnam.

== In culture ==
=== Vietnamese TV series and movies about gangsters ===
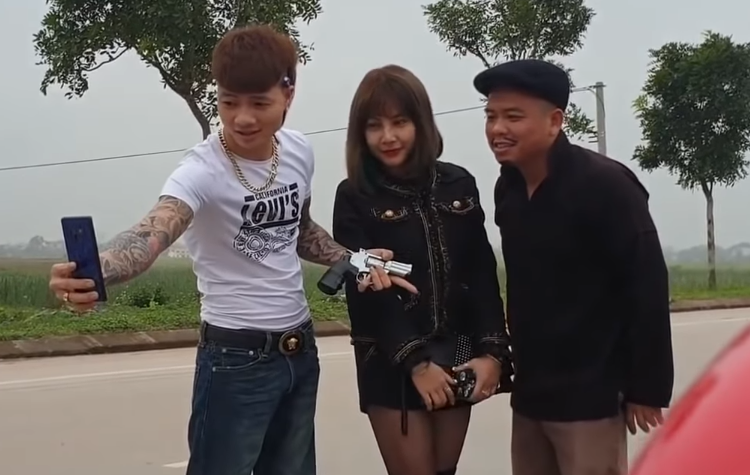
Khá Bảnh with other people filmed a web drama called Sóng gió cuộc đời

- Ông trùm (The crime boss) [vi]
- Mùa cúc susi (Susi's chrysanthemum season) [vi]
- Mê cung (The maze) [vi]
- Người phán xử (The Arbitrator) [vi]
- Bụi đời Chợ Lớn (Gangsters of Chợ Lớn) [vi]
- Bẫy rồng (Clash) [vi]
- Giang hồ Chợ Mới (New Market's gypsies) [vi]

=== Legacy ===
The impact of gangsters such as Đại Cathay and Năm Cam has created a generation that admired the xã hội đen culture. One notable example is Khá Bảnh, a YouTuber known for creating videos that showed him as a man of honor who possesses many moral principles of a giang hồ.

== See also ==
- List of criminal enterprises, gangs, and syndicates
