= Crime in Vietnam =

Crime is present in various forms in Vietnam. According to the United States 2016 OSAC Crime report, Hanoi is rated as medium-risk in Overall Crime and Safety Situation.

== History of organised crime ==
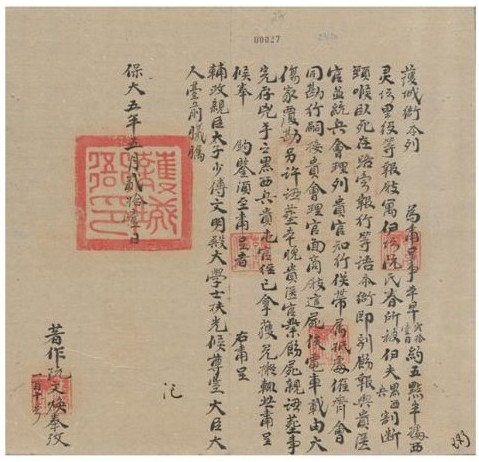
A forensic autopsy and crime investigation report of a female murder victim named Nguyễn Thị Xuân who was killed by a member of the Senegalese Tirailleurs in the year Bảo Đại 5 (1930). Due to overlapping jurisdictions both the Nguyễn dynasty and French colonial authorities were responsible for investigating the crime scene.

Among the first organised crime group to emerge in Vietnam were the Bình Xuyên, which during the 1920s acted mainly as river pirates led by Dương Văn Dương. Bình Xuyên later became a legitimate military organization that controlled nearly the entire supply of opium of Vietnam in 1954.

With the arrival of Vietnamese independence in 1945 (in the North) and 1955 (in the South), organized crime activity, including protection rackets, was drastically reduced as both the Northern and Southern governments purged criminal activity in their parts of the country. In spite of this, organized crime continued to persist in both parts of Vietnam.

In the South during the 1960s, the underworld of Saigon was defined by the "Four Great Kings" period, where the city was ruled by the top four powerful mobsters who presided over much of the organized criminal activities and rackets within the city, such as the drug dens, prostitution houses, night clubs and casinos. These four gangsters were Đại Cathay, Huỳnh Tỳ, Ngô Văn Cái and Ba Thế, referred to with veneration by a Vietnamese saying "Nhất Đại – nhì Tỳ - tam Cái – tứ Thế". These venerations refer to each of the four mobsters respectively by their level of dominance, with Đại Cathay referred to as being the king among kings in the city.

Following 1975 and the reunification of Vietnam, the era of the Four Great Kings came to an end. Later in the 90s, Năm Cam would come to form a dominant criminal group in Saigon, where he was known for running numerous gambling dens, hotels, and restaurants that fronted for brothels. He is said to have gone on a 15-year killing spree in Saigon in order to eliminate his rivals. As such, he is often referred to as the godfather of Vietnam.

Meanwhile, although organized crime also continued to exist in the North, it was much more hidden from the general public and the government's eyes due to the North's more stringent control over organized criminal activity and stricter law enforcement. In spite of this, organized crime persisted. One notable example was an organization formed by Khánh Trắng, the former President of the Đồng Xuân Labor Union in Hanoi, which was the first non-state trade organization in the city. At its height, Khánh Trắng's organization had received praise from the northern government officials as a model example of an organization that should be replicated. However, underneath the guise of operating a legal labor union, Khánh Trắng started to transform the union into a type of organized crime group that extorted merchants in the Đồng Xuân market and created unfair policies that resulted in fines against the local merchants, and profit for Khánh.

Another well known organized crime figure that originated from the North was Dung Hà, who was a female gangster from the city of Haiphong where she originally ran an illicit casino business, which brought her numerous followers or disciples. Other gangsters such as Hải Bánh also originated from the North, but some of them like Hải and Dung Hà later took their operations to the south in order to expand their operations and increase profits.

The Golden Triangle is one of the largest opium-producing areas of the world

Vietnamese drug lords control territories in the northwestern provinces. Because Vietnam is located near the Golden Triangle, its heroin trade is concentrated along its borders with Laos and Cambodia. Since 2019, not only has Vietnam become a drug market but also a transit port that criminals use to traffick drug to other countries.

Meanwhile, Vietnamese illegal trafficking groups control areas in Hồ Chí Minh City. Their networks have been linked to the human-trafficking and human-smuggling markets, the ivory- and pangolin-trafficking markets, illicit logging operations, arms trafficking, and drug-trafficking markets.

=== Structure ===
The Vietnamese mafia, nicknamed "the snake", has a rigid hierarchy, iron discipline, and total control over each member of the community established.

== Crimes against tourists ==
Petty crime, which includes pick-pocketing and snatch theft, is common in Vietnam, especially near airports, sea ports and train stations.

Scams are common in the country, and some of the most common ones include fake taxis/taxi scams, cyclo scams, fraudulent tour companies, shoe shine scam, fruit photo taking scam, massage scam, sunscreen scam and shopping scams.

Foreign travellers have also reported attempts at sexual assault on fake motorcycle taxis (xe ôm) passed off as real ones. There are counterfeit and unauthorized merchandise which can be easily found in many areas of Vietnam.

== Sex trafficking and prostitution ==
Prostitution is against the law in the Socialist Republic of Vietnam. Nevertheless, some women in the country work as prostitutes, either willingly or unwillingly, many blaming poverty or a lack of other employment opportunities. One source estimates the number of prostitutes in Vietnam to be 20,000 to 70,000.

A number of women and girls from all ethnic groups and foreigners have been victims of sex trafficking in Vietnam. They are forced into prostitution or marriages.

== Corruption and police misconduct ==
The Vietnamese government is making an effort to curb corruption in the country and a number of corrupt individuals, ranging from law enforcers to politicians, have been arrested. However, the police force in Vietnam is also known for excessive use of force and there have been reports of police assaulting unarmed individuals. On July 23, 2010, while in detainment for a minor offense (driving a motorcycle without a helmet), 21-year-old Nguyen Van Khuong lost his life when officers reportedly physically assaulted him. This misuse of force has raised concerns of the Human Rights Watch.

== See also ==
- Nguyễn Văn Minh Tiến
- Golden Triangle
