= History of organized crime in Saigon =

Over the course of its long history, Saigon, Vietnam has had many eras of dominant organized crime groups that at one point or another controlled the illicit trade and activities within the city. The long list of the organized crime history in Saigon covers the early Bình Xuyên pirates of the 1920s, to the Four Great Kings period of the 60s and lastly to Năm Cam's criminal reign during the 90s.

== From River Pirates to Opium Lords: The Bình Xuyên ==
Before they became an independent military organization that was fighting as a part of the Vietnamese National Army, the Bình Xuyên, in the 1920s were a loosely organized coalition of gangs that acted as pirates, extorting protection money from travelers in sampans who were traveling through the canals to the Chợ Lớn docks. They also occasionally went into the Saigon-Cholon areas to kidnap, rob or shakedown the wealthy in order to give to the poor. In 1949, Emperor Bảo Đại gave the decree that all non-communist military forces in the country could function as independent armies within the main army in order to solve the problem of having the national army being too small. Shortly after, Bảy Viễn (Lê Văn Viễn), the leader of a major branch of the Bình Xuyên was given the rank of Major General of the Vietnamese National Army and his troops became the QDQG Bình Xuyên, which was a self-funded army with revenues that were derived from legally-run brothels and casinos; Bảy Viễn forcibly took control of the casinos from Macanese organized crime groups.

Despite being recognized as a legitimate military organization, by 1954, the Bình Xuyên had seized control over all the opium dens in Saigon and dominated the distribution of opium throughout Southern Vietnam.

== The 60s and the era of the "Four Great Kings" ==
Saigon, now known as Ho Chi Minh City, has had a long history of organized crime that often ran lucrative illegal activities within the city. During the 1960s period to before 1975, Saigon's underworld at that time was characterized by the era known as the "Four Great Kings", which referred to the four most dominant mobsters in the city, and whose names was immortalized by the infamous phrase "1st) Đại Cathay, 2nd) Huỳnh Tỳ, 3rd) Ngô Văn Cái, 4th) Ba Thế", (Note: Vietnamese: Nhất Đại – nhì Tỳ - tam Cái – tứ Thế) with Đại Cathay assuming the role of "number one" or as the most dominant of the top four mobsters who collectively ruled Saigon. Đại Cathay at the time was known for running numerous illicit establishments, such as prostitution houses, nightclubs, drug dens from between the first and third districts of Saigon, and through befriending various engineers, doctors, and artists, especially Hoang Sayonara who mentored Đại on the business strategy of organizing a casino for large profits, Đại continued to grow more wealthy, powerful and influential within the criminal underworld. Đại Cathay would go on to leave a lasting mark on Năm Cam, a mobster who would go on to later build his own fiefdom in Saigon during the 90s, and he did it mainly through his casino business, a method which he learned during his time of following Đại Cathay.

=== The "Mad Horse" of Chợ Lớn ===
In the fifth district of Chợ Lớn during the 60s, there were several different gang and mafia factions. One of the famous mobsters of Chợ Lớn was Tín Mã Nàm, nicknamed ngựa điên or the "Mad Horse". He was a famous Chinese crime boss, considered as the "Triad King" (Note: Vietnamese: Vua hắc đạo) of Chợ Lớn and was said to be the second highest-ranking member of a Chinese triad named "Hồng Môn", behind only Hoàng Long 黃龍 (meaning Yellow Dragon). Tín Mã Nàm once had his name listed among the Four Kings, which signified his role as a major player in Saigon's underworld along with the aforementioned Four Kings. Nàm made much of his fortune both through the supply of opium and heroin in Saigon, along with other illicit activities and casinos.

One of the major incidents that occurred during this time was a gang war between Đại Cathay and Tín Mã Nàm when Đại was trying to venture his lucrative activities into Chợ Lớn, which was in Nàm's territory. In 1964, a bloody gang battle ensued between the two gangs when Đại and his followers attacked the Great World quarters of Chợ Lớn with knives, swords, and bayonets. Though Đại's gang gained an early advantage during the fight, Mã Nàm's gang gathered their weapons and counterattacked, severely beating and bloodying Đại's gang, who were forced to flee. However, the battle had come at a great cost to Tín Mã Nàm; many people began to avoid his casinos and businesses, which was where the battle had taken place, causing his business to sharply decline. Tín Mã Nàm was then forced to call for a negotiation with Đại, where he and many of the Chinese gangs in Chợ Lớn decided to give up away the areas between Nancy market and District 1 to Đại Cathay's gang.

== The 90s Reign of Năm Cam ==
Trương Văn Cam, better known by his nickname Năm Cam, was first initiated into the Saigon underworld by none other than Huỳnh Tỳ, who at the time was one of the "Four Great Kings" of Saigon. After the fall of Saigon in 1975 however, which ended the era of the Four Great Kings Đại - Tỳ - Cái - Thế, Huỳnh Tỳ turned into follower of Năm Cam in spite of being Cam's elder by 3 years. After spending years in a re-education camp, when Năm Cam was released, he quickly rose to the top of Saigon's underworld by amassing a substantial wealth around himself mostly through his illegal gambling activities. Using his wealth, Năm Cam was able to become nigh untouchable to authorities who were highly susceptible to his bribery, allowing him to operate freely and openly for much of the 90s until 2000, when Năm Cam ordered the murder of a rival female gangster named Dung Hà. Năm Cam would later be arrested and convicted of this murder in 2003, ending his reign over the city.
