= Lê Văn Luyện =

Vietnamese convicted murderer (born 1993)

- Born: 18 October 1993 (age 32); Thanh Lâm, Lục Nam District, Bắc Giang Province, Vietnam
- Convictions: Murder; Robbery
- Penalty: 18 years' imprisonment

Details
- Victims: 3 killed, 1 injured
- Date: 24 August 2011
- Locations: Phố Sàn, Lục Nam District, Bắc Giang Province, Vietnam
- Weapon: Knife
- Date apprehended: 31 August 2011

Lê Văn Luyện (born 18 October 1993) is a Vietnamese convicted murderer who committed a high-profile robbery and mass murder at a gold shop in Bắc Giang Province in 2011. At the age of 17, he killed three people and severely injured a child, leading to widespread public outrage and debates on juvenile justice in Vietnam.

== Early life ==
Lê Văn Luyện was born on 18 October 1993 in a farming family in Sơn Đình 2 village, Thanh Lâm commune, Lục Nam district, Bắc Giang province. Neighbors described him as a "nice and obedient" boy during his childhood. He dropped out of school after failing the 9th-grade graduation exam.

== Crime ==
On 24 August 2011, motivated by financial desperation after losing money on a borrowed motorbike, Luyện broke into the Ngọc Bích gold shop in Phố Sàn, Phương Sơn commune, Lục Nam district. Armed with knives, he cut the electricity and disabled security cameras. He stabbed the shop owner Trịnh Thành Ngọc, his wife Nguyễn Thị Thúy, and their 18-month-old daughter Trịnh Thị Thảo to death. Their eight-year-old daughter Trịnh Thị Ngọc Bích was severely injured, with her hand chopped off, but survived. Luyện stole gold and fled the scene.

== Arrest ==
Luyện was arrested on 31 August 2011 by border guards in Thủy Hùng commune, Văn Lãng district, Lạng Sơn province, while attempting to flee to China. He confessed to being the sole perpetrator.

== Trial ==
As Luyện was 17 years, 10 months, and 6 days old at the time of the crime, he was tried as a juvenile under Vietnamese law, which prohibits the death penalty or life imprisonment for minors. On 11 January 2012, the People's Court of Bắc Giang Province sentenced him to 18 years for murder, 18 years for robbery, and 9 months for abusing credibility to appropriate property, with a combined sentence of 18 years. The sentence was upheld on appeal on 30 March 2012.

The case sparked debates on the adequacy of juvenile sentencing, with public calls for harsher penalties, including the death penalty.

== Imprisonment ==
Luyện is serving his sentence at Prison No. 3 under the Ministry of Public Security. He has reportedly shown remorse, reading Buddhist books for repentance. In 2014, authorities denied rumors of his death in prison. He maintains a withdrawn demeanor and does not socialize much with other inmates.

== See also ==
- Crime in Vietnam
