= Shaul Eisenberg =

Israeli businessman

- שאול אייזנברג
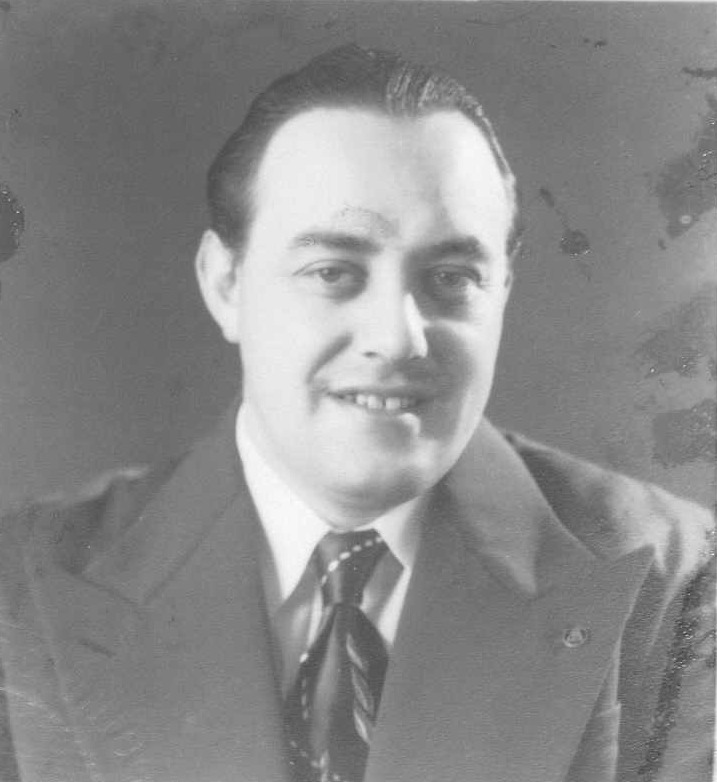
- Eisenberg in May 1957.
- Born: Shaul Nehemia Eisenberg; 22 September 1921; Munich, Bavaria, Germany
- Died: 27 March 1997 (aged 75); Beijing, China
- Resting place: Savyon Cemetery, Central District, Israel
- Spouse: Leah Freudlsperger
- Children: 6

Shaul Nehemia Eisenberg (Hebrew: שאול אייזנברג; 22 September 1921 – 27 March 1997) was an Israeli businessman and billionaire tycoon.

== Biography ==
Shaul Eisenberg was born in Munich to a religious Jewish family from Poland, being the fifth out of six children born to Sophie (née Katz) and David Eisenberg. His mother was from Krakow and his father was from Warsaw. Shortly after the uprising of the Nazis in the government, he fled to Shanghai. While in Tokyo, Eisenberg met and married Leah Freudlsperger, a half-Japanese woman who was the daughter of an Austrian painter, and the couple had five daughters and a son.

Eisenberg died in Beijing in 1997, two years before the expiration of the Eisenberg Law.

After his death, the family fought over the inheritance, valued at around 1 billion dollars. His son continued to operate the family business. Eisenberg's brother, Rafael, who was a Hasidic scholar, died in 1976, leaving twelve children.

== Career ==
Eisenberg's business career began in the immediate aftermath of World War II and was characterized by his role as a high-level mediator, or "fixer," for massive industrial, infrastructure, and military contracts, primarily in Asia.

=== Early Career in Post-War Japan ===
A Jewish refugee who had fled Nazi persecution to Shanghai during World War II, Eisenberg remained in the Far East after the war ended. He settled in post-occupation Japan, where he founded the Eisenberg Group of Companies. He made his initial fortune by trading in iron, steel, and machinery, importing raw materials for Japan's nascent steel industry and exporting finished Japanese products to other markets, such as India.

=== Expansion to South Korea ===
Beginning in the 1950s, Eisenberg expanded his operations to South Korea, where he became a key foreign partner to the government during its rapid industrialization. He specialized in brokering large-scale, state-level projects, connecting the Korean government with major Western industrial corporations, including Siemens, MAN SE, and Fiat Automobiles. His mediation was instrumental in developing production lines, power plants, and purchasing trains and aircraft. For his contributions, Eisenberg received an award from the South Korean government and was considered a "primary factor and catalyst" in the nation's commerce with the West during that period.

=== Pioneering Role in China ===
Eisenberg was one of the first Western businessmen to establish high-level commercial ties with the People's Republic of China, beginning in the mid-1970s while Mao Zedong was still in power. At a time when China and Israel had no formal diplomatic relations, Eisenberg acted as a discreet intermediary, brokering secret arms and military technology sales from Israel to the Chinese military. In 1979, he used his private plane to fly an Israeli defense delegation to Beijing for high-level meetings, a move that built significant trust with the Chinese leadership, including the emerging Deng Xiaoping. These initial military deals, which included missiles, radar systems, and tank shells, paved the way for Eisenberg to become a major force in civilian commercial trade as China began its economic reforms, solidifying his role as a pioneer in Israel-China commerce.

=== Israel Corporation and Later Career ===
Eisenberg, who held Israeli citizenship, also founded the Israel Corporation. A controversial law, nicknamed the "Eisenberg Law," was passed by the Knesset to provide significant tax breaks to his company to encourage investment in the country. In 1979, he established 'Beit Asia' (Asia House) in Tel Aviv as the headquarters for his group's operations.

== Others ==
He worked as secret envoy to Lee Dae-yong - minister of Embassy of the South Korea in South Vietnam.
