= Lee Dae-yong =

South Korean army officer and diplomat (1925–2017)

Lee Dae-yong (Korean: 이대용; Hanja: 李大鎔; 20 November 1925 – 14 November 2017) was a South Korean army officer and diplomat.

== Early life ==
Lee was born in North Hwanghae Province on 20 November 1925.

== Military career ==
During the Korean War, he served as an officer in the 6th Infantry Division, Republic of Korea Army.

He served as a commander of the 1st Company, 1st Battalion, 7th Regiment in the Battle of Chuncheon.

== Diplomat career ==
In 1963, Lee was appointed as a military attaché to the South Korean embassy in South Vietnam. In 1973, he was appointed as a minister in the South Korean embassy in South Vietnam (Originally, he belonged to the Korean Central Intelligence Agency)

During the Fall of Saigon, South Korean diplomats attempted to flee South Vietnam as part of Operation Frequent Wind. Lee and two South Korean diplomats (Ahn Hee-wan and Seo Byeong-ho) failed to escape. They were arrested by the People's Army of Vietnam and held for questioning in Chí Hòa Prison in October 1975.

The North Korean government tried to take the prisoners, but the South Korean government negotiated with North Korea for their return to South Korea.

Following the Sino-Vietnamese War, North Korea supported China. This has soured relations between Vietnam and North Korea.

At that time, the Israeli businessman Shaul Eisenberg worked as a secret envoy for South Korea.

On 12 April 1980, Vietnamese government released Lee and the two other diplomats to South Korea.

== After return ==
In 2001, Lee met Vietnam's ambassador to South Korea Dương Chính Thức, who was the official responsible for his arrest in 1975.

== Awards and decorations ==
- Chungmu Order of Military Merit (1950)
- Hwarang Order of Military Merit (1951)

== Legacy ==
In 1986, his story was turned into a drama (ko:사이공 억류기) on MBC.
