= Capital punishment in Vietnam =

Capital punishment is a legal penalty in Vietnam for a variety of crimes.

The Human Rights Measurement Initiative gives Vietnam a score of 5 out of 10 on the right to freedom from the death penalty, based on responses from human rights experts in the country as of 2024. These experts have also identified that certain groups, such as migrants or immigrants, people with low social or economic status, and refugees or asylum seekers are particularly at risk of having their right to freedom from the death penalty violated. In 2021, these experts additionally identified "politicians or government employees, particularly those who are convicted on corruption charges" and "detainees or prisoners, especially those from low socioeconomic backgrounds and who have low education levels", as being especially vulnerable to death penalty executions.

== Characteristics ==
Thirteen articles in the Penal Code allow capital punishment as an option. Sentences of death are executed by lethal injection. The drugs used to execute prisoners are produced domestically. The first execution conducted by lethal injection was of Nguyen Anh Tuan, convicted of murdering gas station employee Bui Thi Nguyet on 6 August 2013.

In November 2015, a revision of the Penal Code was passed that severely curtailed the application of death penalty. Under the new regulations, which took effect on 1 July 2016, capital punishment was abolished for seven crimes: surrendering to the enemy, opposing order, destruction of projects of national security importance, robbery, drug possession, drug appropriation, and the production and trade of fake food. In addition, those 75 or older are exempt, and officials convicted of corruption charges can be spared if they pay back at least 75% of the proceeds they illicitly obtained.

Between 6 August 2013, and 30 June 2016, Vietnam executed 429 people. 1,134 people were sentenced to death between July 2011 and June 2016. The number of individuals on death row is not known.

On 27 May 2025, The National Assembly of Vietnam began deliberations on a government proposal to abolish capital punishment for some offences, including drug trafficking and some national security crimes, and replace them with life imprisonment. Supporters of abolishing death penalty for certain crimes claimed that it will prevent wrongful convictions and uphold the fundamental right to life of the convicted offender, while opponents claim that reducing the use of death penalty would end a decades long deterrent for very serious crimes, such as drug trafficking and corruption.

On 25 June 2025, the death penalty was abolished for embezzlement, vandalising state property, manufacturing fake medicine, jeopardising peace, triggering invasive wars, espionage, and drug trafficking. It was still retained for ten offences, including murder, child rape, treason, and terrorism.

Capital punishment cannot be applied to juvenile offenders, pregnant women, and women nursing children under 36 months old at the time the crime was committed or being tried. These cases can only receive a maximum of life imprisonment in case of conviction. Furthermore, the death penalty is not carried out on individuals already sentenced to death who are pregnant women, women nursing children under 36 months old, 75 or older, or terminal cancer patients. These cases are commuted to life imprisonment.

== Crimes carrying capital punishment in Vietnam ==
According to the Penal Code, the following chapters contain the relevant articles applying capital punishment.

Penal Code Articles with Capital Punishment
Chapters	Articles
XIII - Crimes of Infringing Upon National Security	108, 112, 113
XIV - Crimes of Infringing Upon Human Life, Health, Dignity, and Honour	123, 142
XV - Crimes of Infringing Upon Citizens' Democratic Freedoms	None
XVI - Crimes of Infringing Upon Ownership Rights	None
XVII - Crimes of Infringing Upon the Marriage and Family Regimes	None
XVIII - Crimes of Infringing Upon the Economic Management Order	None
XIX - Environment-related Crimes	None
XX - Narcotics-related Crimes	248, 251
XXI - Crimes of Infringement Upon Public Safety, Public Order	299
XXII - Crimes of Infringing Upon Administrative Management Order	None
XXIII - Crimes Relating to Position	None
XXIV - Crimes of Infringing Upon Judicial Activities	None
XXV - Crimes of Infringing Upon the Duties and Responsibilities of Army Personnel	None
XXVI - Crimes of Undermining Peace, Against Humanity and War Crimes	422, 423

== See also ==
- Crime in Vietnam
- Law of Vietnam
- Lê Thanh Vân

== Sources ==
- capitalpunishmentuk
