= Gentleman thief =

Stock character; a sophisticated and well-mannered thief

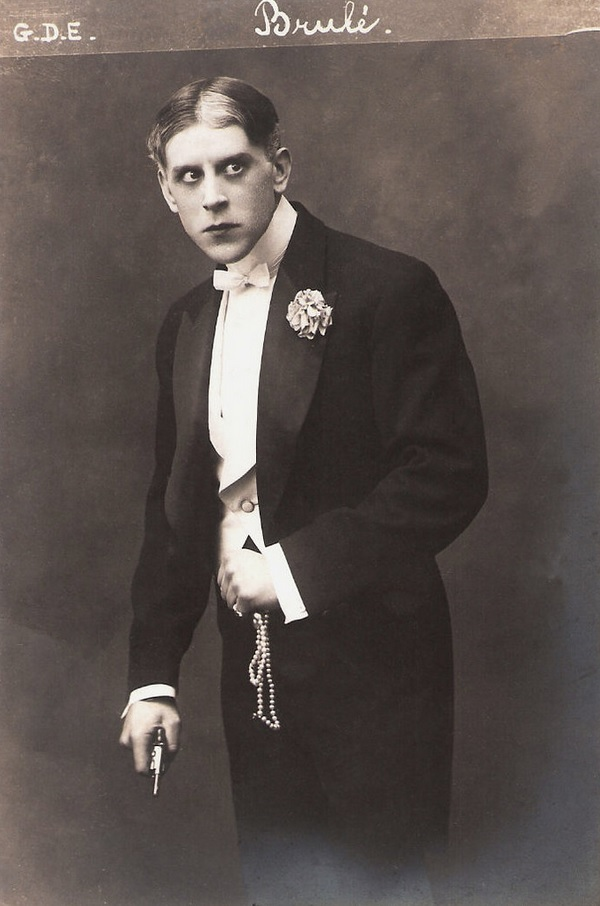
André Brulé as Arsène Lupin, a gentleman thief and master of disguise

A gentleman thief, gentleman burglar, lady thief, or phantom thief is a stock character in fiction. A gentleman or lady thief is characterised by impeccable manners, charm, courtesy, and the avoidance of physical force or intimidation to steal, and often has inherited wealth. They steal not only to gain material wealth but also for the thrill of the act itself, which is often combined in fiction with correcting a moral wrong, selecting wealthy targets, or stealing only particularly rare or challenging objects.

== In fiction ==
In fiction, the gentleman thief is typically superb at stealing while maintaining a gentleman's manners and a code of honour. For example, A. J. Raffles steals only from other gentlemen (and occasionally gives the object away to a good cause); Arsène Lupin steals from the rich who do not appreciate their art or treasures and redistributes it; Saint Tail steals back what was stolen or taken dishonestly or rights the wrongs done to the innocent by implicating the real criminals; Sly Cooper and his gang steal from other, more corrupt thieves and criminals. Kaito Kuroba only steals to amuse the audience, to find the Pandora Gem and to find the people who killed his father.

=== Gentlemen/lady thieves ===
Notable gentlemen thieves and lady thieves in Western popular culture include the following:

- Rocambole, thief, adventurer, and later hero created by Pierre Alexis Ponson du Terrail in 1857.
- A. J. Raffles, and his accomplice Bunny Manders, from the Raffles stories by E. W. Hornung, created in 1898.
- Arsène Lupin, created by Maurice Leblanc in 1905.
- Hercule Flambeau from the Father Brown short stories by G. K. Chesterton, introduced in 1910.
- Jimmie Dale, also known as The Gray Seal, from the series of stories by Frank L. Packard, created in 1914.
- Filibus, an air pirate in the 1915 adventure film Filibus, is a phantom thief in the tradition of Arsène Lupin, carrying out heists for the thrill of it.
- Simon Templar, also known as "The Saint" from the novels and short stories by Leslie Charteris, created in 1928.
- The Robber (unnamed) in Jewel Robbery (1932).
- Bugs Bunny in Looney Tunes, introduced in 1940.
- Selina Kyle, also known as Catwoman, from the Batman comic books, introduced in 1940.
- Oswald Cobblepot, also known as The Penguin, from the Batman comic books, introduced in 1941.
- Rick Blaine from Casablanca in 1942.
- Jim Craddock, also known as Gentleman Ghost, from the DC Comics universe, introduced in 1947.
- John Robie in Alfred Hitchcock's To Catch a Thief (1955).
- Danny Ocean from the film Ocean's 11 (1960) and the Ocean's Trilogy (2001–2007).
- Jimmy Bourne in The Happy Thieves (1961).
- Sir Charles Litton, also known as "The Phantom" in The Pink Panther (1963).
- Thomas Hewett Edward Cat from the TV series T.H.E. Cat (1966–1967).
- Thomas Crown from The Thomas Crown Affair (1968).
- Sir Oliver from the Alan Ford comics, created in 1969.
- Captain Feeney in Barry Lyndon (1975).
- Edward Pierce from The Great Train Robbery (1975).
- Miss Eula Goodnight from Rooster Cogburn (1975).
- Bernie Rhodenbarr, narrator of a novel series by Lawrence Block, created in 1977.
- Felicia Hardy, also known as Black Cat, from the Spider-Man comics, introduced in 1979.
- René Belloq in Raiders of the Lost Ark (1981).
- Carmen Sandiego, the title character from the Carmen Sandiego franchise, created in 1985.
- Walter Donovan in Indiana Jones and the Last Crusade (1989).
- Remy Etienne LeBeau, also known as Gambit, from the X-Men comics, introduced in 1990.
- Garrett, the Master Thief in Thief series of games (1998–2004).
- Scipio Massimo in Cornelia Funke's The Thief Lord (2000).
- Viper and also Valmont from the animated Jackie Chan Adventures (2000–2005).
- The Toy Taker, aka Mr. Cuddles from Rudolph the Red-Nosed Reindeer and the Island of Misfit Toys (2001).
- Sly Cooper, created in 2002.
- Jack Sparrow from Pirates of the Caribbean franchise (2003).
- Moist von Lipwig from Terry Pratchett's Discworld novels; he is the main character of Going Postal (2004), Making Money (2007), and Raising Steam (2015).
- RJ in Over the Hedge (2006).
- Locke Lamora from Scott Lynch's The Gentleman Bastard Sequence, created in 2006.
- Irina Spalko in Indiana Jones and the Kingdom of the Crystal Skull (2008).
- Vincent Kosmos in Vincent Kosmos: The time-thief, web series created in 2008.
- Neal Caffrey in the television series White Collar (2009–2014).
- David Goldman in An Education (2009).
- Lady Christina de Souza from the Doctor Who episode "Planet of the Dead" (2009).
- Pierre Despereaux, a recurring character in the television series Psych, portrayed by Cary Elwes, introduced in its fourth season in 2009.
- Kasumi Goto from the Mass Effect video game series, introduced in 2010. Her name approximately translates to "phantom thief."
- Flynn Rider in Tangled (2010).
- Gru in Despicable Me (2010).
- Megamind in Megamind (2010).
- Michael De Santa and Devin Weston in Grand Theft Auto V (2013).
- The Four Horsemen; Dylan Rhodes, Henley Reeves, J. Daniel Atlas, Jack Wilder, Lula, and Merrit McKinney in Now You See Me trilogy (2013–2025).
- Surly Squirrel in The Nut Job (2014).
- Constantine the Frog in Muppets Most Wanted (2014).
- Josiah Trelawny in Red Dead Redemption II (2018).
- Nolan Booth in Red Notice (2021).
- Loba Andrade, a playable character from the game Apex Legends, introduced in its fifth season in Spring 2021.
- Diane Foxington, Mr. Snake, Ms. Tarantula, Mr. Shark and Mr. Wolf in The Bad Guys (2022).
- Nathan Drake of the Uncharted franchise.
- Andrés de Fonollosa (Berlin) of the Money Heist franchise.
- Freddie "The Frog" Robdal, biological father of Rodney Trotter in Only Fools And Horses.
- Puss In Boots in the Shrek franchise. Introduced in 2004 in Shrek 2.

=== Phantom thieves ===
Phantom thief (Japanese: 怪盗, Hepburn: kaitō) is the term for the gentleman/lady thief in Japanese media such as anime, manga, and JRPGs. It draws inspiration from Arsène Lupin and elements in other crime and detective fictions.

Notable phantom thieves in Japanese popular culture include the following:

- Lupin III (the grandson of Arsène Lupin, according to his creator, Monkey Punch) and Fujiko Mine, from Lupin the Third, created in 1967.
- The Kisugi sisters (Hitomi, Rui and Ai) from the manga and anime series Cat's Eye, introduced in 1981.
- Tuxedo Mask, also known as Mamoru Chiba, and later the husband of Sailor Moon, was at the start of the manga a thief searching for the Silver Crystal.
- Kaito Kuroba, also known as the "Kaitō Kid", the main character of Magic Kaito and a recurring character in Detective Conan by Gosho Aoyama, created in 1987.
- Kaitō Shinshi, the lady thief in The Kindaichi Case Files, introduced in 1992.
- Meimi Haneoka, who transforms into Saint Tail, a phantom thief with acrobatic and magician skills, from Saint Tail by Megumi Tachikawa; created in 1995.
- The Mysterious Thief Dorapin from The Doraemons, a spin-off of Doraemon, introduced in 1997.
- Dark Mousy, the angel-like phantom thief from D.N.Angel by Yukiru Sugisaki, introduced in 1997.
- Henry Agata (Hikaru Agata) A.K.A. Phantom Renegade (Kaito Retort) from Medabots, introduced in 1997.
- Kamikaze Kaitō Jeanne, the title character in Phantom Thief Jeanne, created in 1998.
- Ada Wong, from Resident Evil (Biohazard in Japan), a supporting and playable character originally appearing in 1998.
- Clara, better known as the phantom thief Psiren, an exclusive character from the 2003 anime adaptation of the manga Fullmetal Alchemist.
- Keith Harcourt/Black Rose, from Ashita no Nadja, created in 2003.
- Bleublanc, also known as Phantom Thief B, from the Trails series, introduced in 2004.
- Mask☆DeMasque, an Ace Attorney character, from the third game, Phoenix Wright: Ace Attorney – Trials and Tribulations (2004).
- The Red Dozer gang from Drill Dozer. Introduced in 2005.
- Jack, also known as Joker, the title character from the anime and manga Mysterious Joker who sometimes works with other phantom thieves in the series, created in 2007.
- Riko Mine Lupin IV of Aria the Scarlet Ammo, the great-granddaughter of Arsène Lupin. Allegedly, she is the child of Lupin III and Fujiko Mine, whom her surnames are derived from; introduced in 2008.
- Daiki Kaitō, portrayed by Kimito Totani, a character who can transform into Kamen Rider Diend from 2009 Kamen Rider Decade.
- Jean Descole, a character from the Professor Layton series, introduced in Professor Layton and the Last Specter in 2009.
- Arsène, Rat, Twenty, and Stone River comprise the Thieves' Empire (Kaitou Teikoku) in Tantei Opera Milky Holmes, created in 2010.
- Loser, from Dimension W, introduced in 2011.
- Raphael/Ralph, also known as the Phantom R, the main character of Rhythm Thief & the Emperor's Treasure, created in 2012.
- Danjuro Tobita, also known as the "Gentle Criminal", from the anime and manga series My Hero Academia, introduced in 2014.
- Joker and the Phantom Thieves of Hearts, from Persona 5, created in 2016.
- Count Night from Beyblade Burst Cho-Z created in 2018.
- The Lupinrangers in Kaitou Sentai Lupinranger VS Keisatsu Sentai Patranger, created in 2018.
- The Phantomirage in Secret × Warrior Phantomirage!, created in 2019.
- Laurent Thierry, a con artist in Great Pretender, introduced in 2020.
- The Bundoru Gang (ブンドル団, Bundoru-dan), the main antagonists of Delicious Party Pretty Cure (2022–2023).
- The Phantom Thieves' Guild (怪盗団ファントム, Kaitou-dan Fantomu), the main antagonists of Star Detective Precure!
- Mockingbird, a phantom thief syndicate in Zenless Zone Zero, introduced in 2025.

== Perceptions of real historical figures ==
- Charles Earl Boles (b. 1829; d. after 1888), known as Black Bart, was an English-born outlaw noted for the poetic messages he left behind after two of his robberies. Considered a gentlemanly bandit with a reputation for style and sophistication, he was one of the most notorious stagecoach robbers to operate in and around Northern California and southern Oregon during the 1870s and 1880s.
- Willie Sutton, a gentleman bank robber of the 1920s who never harmed a person during his robberies and carried only unloaded weapons during the heists.
- D. B. Cooper, the only unidentified hijacker in American aviation history, who, in 1971, extorted $200,000 from an airline before parachuting out of a plane during the cover of night. A flight attendant described him as calm, polite, and well-spoken, not at all consistent with the stereotypes (enraged, hardened criminals or "take-me-to-Cuba" political dissidents) popularly associated with air piracy at the time. Another flight attendant agreed: "He wasn't nervous", she told investigators. "He seemed rather nice. He was never cruel or nasty. He was thoughtful and calm all the time." He ordered a bourbon and 7 Up, paid his drink tab (and attempted to give a flight attendant the change), and offered to request meals for the flight crew during the stop in Seattle.
- Bạch Hải Đường was known as the phantom thief (Vietnamese: siêu trộm) in southern Vietnam from 1970 to 1982. He was wanted by both the pre-1975 National Police and the later Public Security Forces. Bạch Hải Đường was believed to have never killed anyone and that he had only actually used his gun once in a gold robbery, which was also the reason the police started to use lethal force on him. During one of his arrests, he confessed that he used all stolen money for himself. However, since Bạch Hải Đường wasn't known to be a wasteful spender, there were rumours that he donated his money to charity.

== See also ==
- Gentleman detective
- Wuxia, a genre often with secret societies of outlaws who value honor
- Xianxia, a wuxia offshoot that is a fantasy genre with some popular works that value radical politics often of a traditionalist Chinese religious bent, and often have brutal thief characters who steal and lie but still have a sense of honor
