= Lê Thanh Vân =

Executed Vietnamese serial killer

- Born: 5 December 1956; Saigon, South Vietnam (present-day Ho Chi Minh City, Vietnam)
- Died: 26 October 2005 (aged 48); Thủ Dầu Một, Vietnam
- Cause of death: Execution by firing squad
- Other names: "The Cyanide Witch" "The Cyanide Killer" "The Poison Witch"; Lee Ly Lan; Lâm Anh Đào
- Status: Executed
- Convictions: Murder (13 counts); Robbery; Illegal possession of poison
- Penalty: Death

Details
- Victims: 13–16+
- Span of crimes: 1998–2001
- Country: Vietnam
- States: Đồng Nai, Ho Chi Minh City, Bình Dương
- Date apprehended: 15 October 2001

Lê Thanh Vân (5 December 1956 – 26 October 2005), popularly nicknamed The Cyanide Witch (Phù Thủy Xyanua), was a Vietnamese fraudster and serial killer who, together with her husband and accomplice Dìu Dãnh Quang, poisoned at least 13 people with cyanide from 1998 to 2001 for financial gain. Regarded as the most prolific and infamous serial killer in the country's history, she was convicted, sentenced to death and subsequently executed for her crimes in 2005.

== Early life and crimes ==
Lê Thanh Vân was born on 5 December 1956, in Saigon, South Vietnam, the second in a family of eight children born to a drainage worker and a midwife. Her elder brother died as a child, leading to her being the oldest of the seven remaining siblings. From an early age, Vân had an eccentric and cold personality, was considered unruly, constantly argued with other family members and even beat the family pets. She studied until the 12th grade before dropping out halfway through the term, and in 1975, she enrolled at the Military Medical School of Dentistry. Some time afterwards, she was arrested for attempting to cross the border illegally and was sentenced to 16 months imprisoned at a re-education camp. Following her release, she worked various jobs in order to make a living.

In December 1979, Vân was arrested in District 10 for impersonating an army captain, for which she was sentenced to several months imprisonment. In March 1990, she was arrested in District 5 for a number of forgeries and thefts and imprisoned for 18 months. After her release, she was employed by the Chung family as their caretaker. On October 24, 1992, the entire family had to be hospitalized after eating some chicken noodles prepared by her, with the wife of Mr. Chung, Bùi, succumbing to the poisoning. Following the incident, the surviving family members accused Vân of deliberately poisoning their meals and requested that an autopsy be performed at the Chợ Rẫy Hospital. The results concluded that Bùi had died in a state of intoxication, but as there was insufficient evidence to charge Vân with murder, she was instead convicted of fraud and sentenced to 4 years imprisonment.

Before this, she had been married twice: the first time was to Nguyễn Quang Mễ in 1984, with whom she had two children. He died from undisclosed causes in 1989, and two years later, Vân remarried to a man named Lê Văn Minh, who died suddenly at the Nguyễn Tri Phương Hospital the following year.

== Crimes ==
=== First murders ===
At the end of 1997, while she was working at the Military Hospital 7A in Ho Chi Minh City, Vân became acquainted with Đinh Văn Khảm, who was visiting a relative there. During their conversation, Vân claimed to be a dental specialist who studied in Germany and supposedly knew seven languages, impressing her companion so much that he offered her a job at his family's dental clinic in Long Khánh. She accepted his offer, and shortly after moving there, she met and married another employee, Dìu Dãnh Quang. However, due to their failing business, Quang was at risk of being fired, as Khảm's elderly mother, Võ Thị Lý, had suggested to her son that they let him go. Knowing this, on 3 January 1998, while Khảm was away, Vân laced a glass of lemonade with cyanide and gave it to Lý, who collapsed only half an hour later. Vân and Quang then took her to the emergency room, where she subsequently succumbed to her injuries. On the way back, Vân stole approximately 900,000 đồng of Lý's money and personal possessions.

On 2 June, Vân found a new target - Quách Cẩm Minh, a security guard for the Thiên Phú Company in the Tân Bình district, who leased her a dental facility for 500,000 đồng per month. After giving him some poisoned alcohol, Minh became ill and was taken to the Tân Bình Medical Center, where he subsequently died. During that time, Vân went to his house and rummaged through his belongings, stealing 900,000 đồng in the process. A month later, she poisoned the tea of her mother-in-law, Hín Văn Dính, and after her death, she appropriated approximately 2.8 million đồng in inheritance.

On 24 February 1999, Vân was asked by her brother-in-law, Lê Văn Cẩm, to administer some medicine to his finger, which he had recently broken. While he was not looking, she mixed in some cyanide into his medication, and by the end of the day, Cẩm succumbed to the effects while undergoing treatment at the Gia Định People's Hospital. After killing him, Vân, still pretending to be a trained dental specialist, offered to conduct a health check on a woman named Hồ Thị Mộng Đào. While on the way to her office, they stopped at a roadside noodle shop for lunch, and while Đào was not looking, Vân poisoned her bowl of noodles. The woman soon fell ill and was driven to the emergency room of the Mắt Thành Hospital in Ho Chi Minh City, where she received prompt treatment and survived. She was released that same night into her acquaintance's care, but Vân poisoned her again on that same night, ultimately killing her. Some months after this, she also poisoned Võ Hữu Khiêm, a company director, as she wanted to steal his motorbike.

=== Further murders and initial arrest ===
In 2000, Vân, using the alias Lee Ly Lan, was hired by Nguyễn Thanh Sơn, who lived in the small town of An Linh, in Bình Dương province. On 14 April, Sơn died after a prolonged illness, which had occurred after he ate poisoned rice vermicelli cooked by Vân. At the end of June, two more people acquainted with her, Nguyễn Văn Đông and Trần Thị Xinh, were also poisoned to death. In the aftermath of her death, Vân sent a handwritten letter to Xinh's relatives, claiming that she recently sold her a car worth 200 million đồng.

Not long after, local police arrested Vân on charges of murder and robbery, and after searching through her handbag, they found 2.8 grams of cyanide. However, due to a lack of substantial evidence to uphold these charges, the police instead kept her on fraud charges while they conducted tests on the obtained cyanide. The toxicology reports found no match to the substance found in the organs of the two victims, and due to this, Vân was released on bail on 15 January 2001.

=== Final murders and second arrest ===
In March 2001, Vân met an old friend, Nguyễn Trung Dzu, who offered to drive her on his motorbike to a nearby café where they could chat over a bottle of soy milk. While Dzu was doing some repairs on his motorbike, she managed to slip some cyanide into his glass of milk, and after 15 minutes, Dzu fell ill and had to be taken to the local hospital. He died five hours later, with the official cause of death being labelled a stroke. Taking advantage of his death, Vân stole 74,000 đồng and Dzu's mobile phone, and even attempted to overstate the funeral expenses so that Dzu's son could repay her later, but this did not go through. Afterwards, she pawned his motorbike for 2.8 million đồng. Vân then fled to the Trảng Bom district, where she poisoned a woman named Đào Thị Có after she failed to convince her with her fake dental practice certificate.

From June to August 2001, Vân poisoned two additional people. The first was a man named Trần Văn Khôi, who was killed for his motorbike, followed soon after by a woman named Vi Thị Thanh. Using her previous victim's motorbike, Văn drove Thanh to the hospital, where he later died. Then, under the alias of Lâm Anh Đào, Vân appropriated her victim's clothing store and sold some land she owned in the Bù Đăng district for 40 million đồng.

In the meantime, the investigators continued to quietly investigate Vân's activities and repeatedly ask her for interviews, but were denied each time. Because of this, in order to prevent her from committing any further crimes, they eventually charged her illegal possession of poison. The arrest warrant was approved, and Vân was subsequently arrested in the village of Đức Liễu on October 15.

== Investigations ==
By early July 2002, senior investigators from three provinces had merged unsolved murders in their respective jurisdictions into one case. One officer suggested that in order for their case to be complete, they had to clarify what role Vân's husband played in it. Because of this, Quang was arrested on August 14 on charges of failure to inform on a capital crime.

On 3 January 2003, the investigating agency organized a preliminary review of the case to assess what they knew of the case so far: at that time, Khôi's body had not been located, there were few known witnesses and Vân feigned illness to avoid cooperating with the authorities. Due to this, the lead investigator decided to ask her solely about the murder of Thanh at first. A month later, after being transferred to a new location, Vân confessed to the killing. To the investigators' shock, she admitted responsibility for further crimes, bringing her total known victim count to 13. In addition to this, there were other unverified fatalities and surviving victims, but these were not prosecuted due to a lack of evidence. When questioned about where she got the cyanide from, Vân claimed that she had bought it at a chemical store in Ho Chi Minh City's District 10.

== Trial and sentence ==
The trial began on 25 August 2004. It became an instant sensation, as it was the first time in the country's judicial history that a defendant was charged with murdering 13 people, in what the international media called Vietnam's first prosecution of a serial killer. During the trial, Vân asserted that she was innocent, claiming that she had simply been at the crime scenes to transport the victims to the emergency room and had been forced to testify by police. On 28 August, she fainted in court and caused the trial to be adjourned. Two days later, an examination by a doctor concluded that this was the result of an undetermined psychological problem.

The prosecutors sought the death sentence for Vân on three separate charges (murder, robbery and illegal possession of poison), while simultaneously seeking a sentence of 21–24 years for her husband for two counts of murder and robbery. Eventually, the pair were found guilty on their respective charges, with Vân being sentenced to death while Quang received a 21-year sentence for his role as an accomplice in Khôi's murder.

Later on, both of them appealed to the Supreme People's Court: Vân claimed that her sentence was unjust, while Quang asked for a reduction. During the appellate hearing on 1 February 2005, Vân admitted to the charges of illegal possession of poison and two counts of murder and robbery, but continued to deny the remaining convictions. In the end, her sentence was upheld, but Quang's sentence was reduced from 21 to 17 years imprisonment. Vân then filed a request for a pardon to President Trần Đức Lương, but it was swiftly denied.

== Execution ==
On 26 October 2005, Vân was executed by a firing squad at the cemetery of Thủ Dầu Một. According to Nguyễn Dũng, a member of the local Execution Council, Vân cursed and fought back the guards as she was escorted out of her cell, and later burst into tears when she heard that her pardon request had been denied. In addition, she did not eat her requested last meal. Shortly before her execution, she had asked for the soldiers to remove her blindfold so she could "see her relatives and the outside scenery one last time."

== Aftermath ==
Some aspects of Vân's killing spree remain the subject of debate and speculation to this day. Lê Minh Tiến, a journalist commenting for Tuổi Trẻ, suggested that her unstable life, childhood issues and repeated prison stints led her to commit murder. In his book Criminology of Serial Poisoners, American author Michael Farrell commented that Vân was a financially-motivated killer who intentionally committed her crimes across multiple provinces, likely because it was unlikely the killings could be linked together that way. In the aftermath of the crimes, Nguyễn Thế Bình, a major official at the Ministry of Public Security, commented that there were four main lessons the police and public had to learn from the case: 1. the public has to be wary of strangers who take the initiative and invite them to eat; 2. the police agencies must closely monitor suspects; 3. apply new and advanced investigation techniques; and 4. the state had to take strict measures concerning the management of poisons.

== See also ==
- List of serial killers by country

== Bibliography ==
- Newton, Michael (2006). The Encyclopedia of Serial Killers. Infobase Publishing. p. 370. ISBN 978-0-8160-6987-3.
- Farrell, Michael (2018). Criminology of Serial Poisoners. Palgrave Macmillan. pp. 203–205. ISBN 978-3-030-01138-3.
- Hall, Susan (2021). The World Encyclopedia of Serial Killers, Volume Four T–Z. WildBlue Press. p. 274. ISBN 978-1-952225-36-9.
