= Bạch Hải Đường =

Vietnamese thief (1950–1983)

- Born: Nguyễn Ngọc Truyện; 1950; Long Xuyên, (Note: Long Xuyên was a province until 1956, when it merged with Châu Đốc to form An Giang) State of Vietnam
- Died: July 13, 1983 (aged 32–33); An Giang, Vietnam
- Known for: A gentleman thief in southern Vietnam

Bạch Hải Đường (1950–1983), whose real name was Nguyễn Ngọc Truyện, was known as the phantom thief (Vietnamese: siêu trộm) in southern Vietnam from 1970 to 1982. He was wanted by both the pre-1975 National Police and the later Public Security Forces.

Bạch Hải Đường was believed to have never killed anyone and that he had only actually used his gun once in a gold robbery, which was also the reason the police started to use lethal force on him. During one of his arrest, he confessed that he used all stolen money for himself. However, since Bạch Hải Đường wasn't known to be a wasteful spender, there were rumours that he donated his money to charity.

== Life ==
=== Early years ===
Born to a poor family in 1950 Long Xuyên, Nguyễn Ngọc Truyện was the son of Nguyễn Văn Của, a porter, and Lê Thị Huê, a bread seller. In 1962, his father was accused of being a bandit and was shot dead on the street by the police. His mother left the town while he was adopted by his uncle. In 1969, Nguyễn Ngọc Triệu married and moved to Cần Thơ for some time to avoid being drafted.

=== Before 1975 ===
In 1971, Truyện's son fell ill and with no money to buy medicine, he and some of his friends formed a robber band. They often aimed at rich families, Vietnamese bureaucrats, and foreign officials in An Giang, even went as far as robbing a military base. Captain Nguyễn Văn Triệu, Deputy Commander of Long Xuyên Town Police Forces, issued an arrest warrant for Nguyễn Ngọc Truyện under the name Bạch Hải Đường (literally means "White Malus"), calling him "general of robbers" (Vietnamese: tướng cướp).

==== Captain Triệu and Bạch Hải Đường ====
Captain Nguyễn Văn Triệu was a police officer of South Vietnam. He was well known for his brutal way of dealing with criminals in the region of the time, though it was believed that Captain Triệu was financially supported by two gang groups. Triệu was even awarded with the "Third Class Hero" medal (huân chương "Anh dũng hạng Ba") by Brigadier General Trần Văn Hai.

As Bạch Hải Đường became more famous, Captain Triệu had ordered his men to kill the phantom thief on sight. Bạch Hải Đường decided to play a trick on Captain Triệu. While his gang was distracting Triệu's men elsewhere, he and two others broke into the captain's home. They quickly attacked and locked the house servant in the toilet room. Triệu's wife was reading when Bạch Hải Đường opened her room door, pointing a gun at her. After introducing his name, Bạch Hải Đường ordered his partner to tie her up and they began to pillage the house.

Bạch Hải Đường then called the police station to inform Captain Triệu that he had "borrowed some of his stuff". Two days later, wanted posters were issued, stating that "Nguyễn Ngọc Truyện aka Bạch Hải Đường is a particularly dangerous robber who has committed many crimes and harmed the security of the National Government."

=== Since 1975 ===
After the Reunification Day, Bạch Hải Đường was arrested by the new government, but managed to break free. After escaping another prison, he committed a gold robbery, was shot at the leg, and was imprisoned again. In 1980, he broke free again. Three years later, he was shot and arrested again. Due to having many untreated injuries, Bạch Hải Đường died at the age of 33.

== Personal life ==
Bạch Hải Đường divorced his first wife in 1972 and married a woman named Nguyễn Thị Lệ. However, Lệ later reported Bạch Hải Đường's crime to the police, causing their relationship to end. He had four younger sisters, two sons with his first wife, and another son with his second wife. He learned martial arts from his uncle.

== Opinions ==
A wife of Bạch Hải Đường's friend said that he had a gentle manner and a gander face, he spoke politely and knew how to behave in front of his elders. Though, she also marked that the thief's eyes and voice were sharp and scary whenever he "worked".

Some described Bạch Hải Đường as "a gallant giang hồ" who "robbed the rich to give to the poor", while others believed he was just "a petty thief" that Captain Triệu couldn't catch and the story about "general of robbers" was created to prevent humiliation.

== See also ==
Gentleman thief

- Charles E. Boles
- Willie Sutton
- D. B. Cooper
- In fiction: Kaito Kid
