= Eight-Finger Phước =

Vietnamese criminal

- Phước "tám ngón"
- Phước in prison
- Born: Nguyễn Hữu Thành; 1971 or 1972; Dĩ An district or An Đức district, Biên Hòa province, South Vietnam
- Died: 22 October 1996 (aged 24–25); Long Bình commune, Thủ Đức district, Ho Chi Minh City, Vietnam
- Resting place: Long Bình execution ground cemetery, Long Bình, Ho Chi Minh City, Vietnam
- Status: Executed by shooting
- Convictions: First-degree murder; Theft
- Penalty: Death (1994, 1996)
- Escaped: 26 March 1995
- Escape end: 29 April 1996

Details
- Imprisoned at: Chí Hòa Prison

Nguyễn Hữu Thành (1971 or 1972 – 22 October 1996), nicknamed Eight-Finger Phước (Vietnamese: Phước "tám ngón"), was a Vietnamese gangster convicted of murder, theft, and illegal possession of military weapons; he was sentenced to death in 1994 and again in 1996. He led a notorious robbery gang in the early 1990s that operated mainly in Thủ Đức, Hồ Chí Minh City.

Phước was the first person since 1975 to escape from Chí Hòa Prison, one of the most secure prisons in Vietnam.

== Early life ==
Phước was born in 1971 or 1972 into a poor family in Dĩ An district (or An Đức district from August 1971 to October 1972), Biên Hòa province. He dropped out of school, having only completed the first grade and proficient in neither reading nor writing.

At the age of 16, after being scolded by his mother during a night out, Phước severed the little and index fingers of his left hand, leaving him with eight fingers. Phước was also said to have tied and thrown his father into a well out of anger, only pulling the older man out after he fainted. His father died one year later.

Phước soon left home, making a living through gambling and robbery.

== Criminal career ==
=== Early activities ===
In 1988, at the age of 17, Phước was sentenced to 36 months in prison by the People's Court of Gò Vấp District in Hồ Chí Minh City for theft. When he was released, the police of Hồ Chí Minh City sent him to Vũng Tàu for rehabilitation and forced labor. Refusing to rehabilitate, he escaped from the detention camp, bought guns, and formed a robbery gang under his leadership. The gang mainly operated in Thủ Đức and Đồng Nai. In early 1991, they usually took advantage of the deserted mountain roads, going at dusk to ambush passersby, shooting and injuring them to steal their motorbikes. During half of one month, the gang committed two robberies, one theft, and killed a victim in Thủ Đức. Phước often used a short-barrel AK-47 during robberies.

The Ministry of Public Security and the Hồ Chí Minh City police established a task force to dismantle the gang. Police from Đồng Nai, Sông Bé were also mobilized. After one year, on 19 April 1994, Phước was arrested and detained by the Sông Bé police. On 24 June 1994, he was tried at the Hồ Chí Minh City People's Court for robbery, illegal use of military weapons and first-degree murder, and was sentenced to death.

=== Escape ===
Phước was held in Chí Hòa Prison, taken to a cell reserved for death row prisoners. In the detention area, he became familiar with several of the laboring inmates. In February 1995, Phước met inmate Nguyễn Văn Minh, and asked him for a razor blade, claiming it was for shaving. In March, Phước asked Minh for a lighter. Minh secretly took the items to him. While using the toilet in solitary confinement, Phước had discovered that the toilet wall was rotting, and he planned to break through that wall to escape.

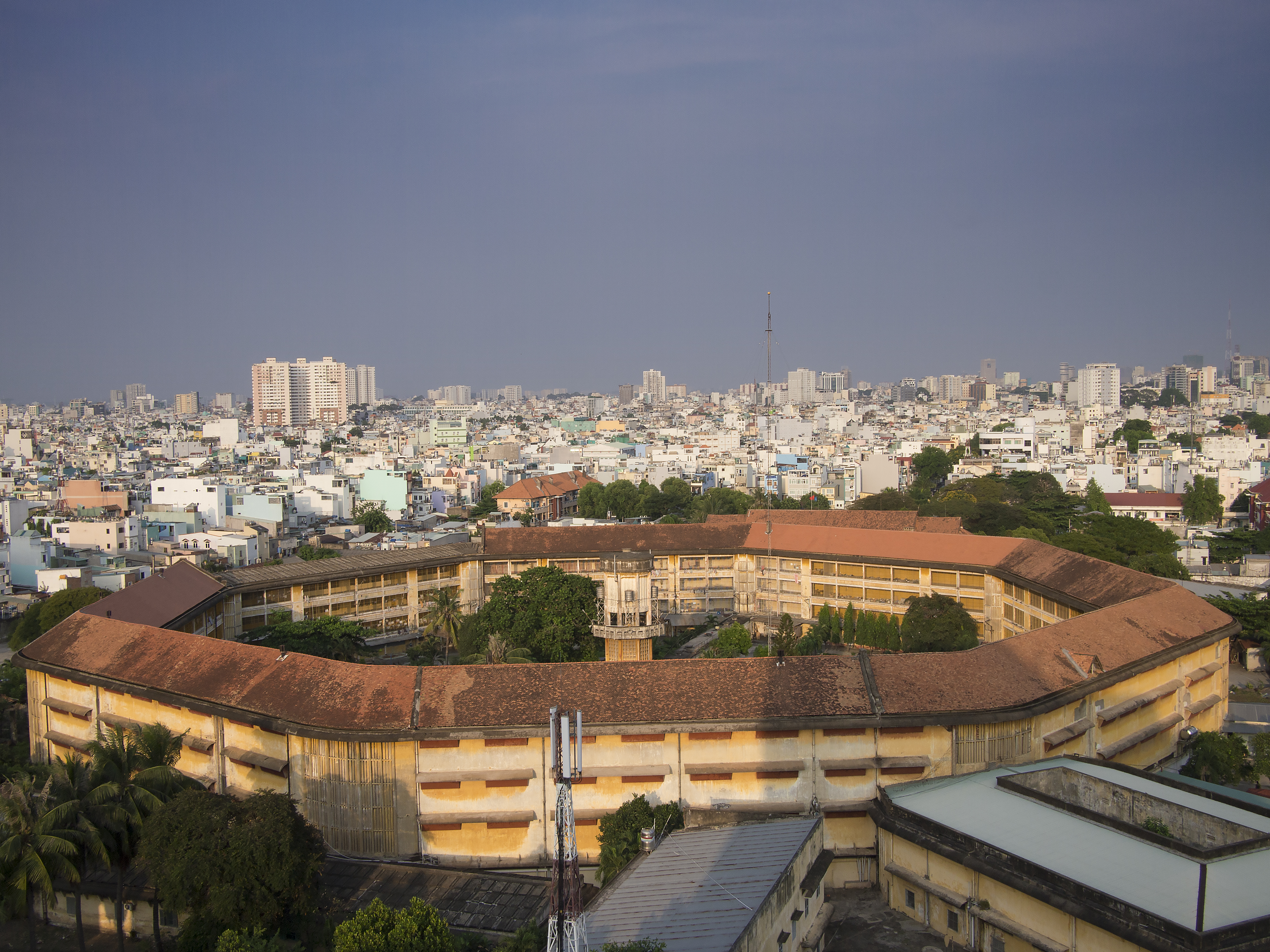
Chí Hòa prison in 2016

With the razor blade, Phước managed to saw through his iron shackles in 5 days. To prevent detection of the damage to the shackles, he threaded pieces of cloth through the sawed grooves and heated them with the lighter from Minh, so that color from the fabric covered the saw marks. Phước also found an iron ring on the toilet door frame. He removed it and used the iron shackles to straighten it. He sharpened the iron into a pointed awl, then hid it in the hole in the wall of his prison cell.

At 9 p.m. (UTC+7:00) on 26 March 1995, when the prisoners had gone to sleep, Phước removed his shackles and crawled into the toilet. He used the iron awl to create a hole just large enough for him to squeeze through. He dumped the sand and scraps of cement he had chipped away into the toilet and flushed them away, and carried the bricks into his sleeping area, arranging them so that they resembled a person lying down. When he reached the roof, he tied his prisoner clothes to make a rope to climb down; however, the rope broke and he fell to the ground face down, which knocked him unconscious. After regaining consciousness, he got up and climbed a nearby electric pole to reach the guards' housing complex. He hid until dawn, then sneaked into the courtyard, taking a police uniform that was drying and, later, a bicycle and a pair of sandals. He then wheeled the bicycle to the guard post, and asked the officer on duty to open the gate so he could "go out for coffee". The officer opened the gate, completing Phước's escape, in the early morning of 27 March 1995.

This escape by a gang leader led to severe disciplinary action against almost all of the prison management board, security guards, and wardens.

=== Robbery spree and rearrest ===
In March 1995, after escaping from prison, Phước sold the bicycle for ₫60,000 (around ₫310,000 in 2026, or US$11.79), returned to Thủ Đức and went to his wife's house to meet her, then ran away after she gave him 7.5 g (0.26 ounces) of gold. He travelled to Tiền Giang to hide and treat the injuries he received from the fall. When his wounds had healed, in April 1995, he returned to Thủ Đức again to meet his two former accomplices to ask for money for expenses. Weeks later, in the middle of the night, he took his wife and children to Buôn Ma Thuột City, Đắk Lắk. To get money, Phước attempted theft several times but failed. So after a short time, in July 1995, they went back to Thủ Đức.

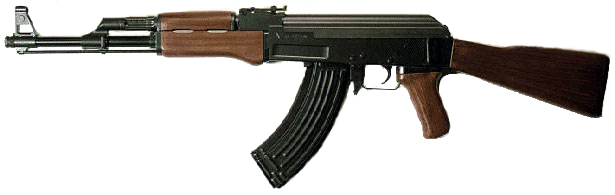
an AK-47 rifle, a weapon that Phước often used to commit robberies.

In Thủ Đức, Phước and his accomplice Nguyễn Kim Sơn broke into a house and stole two motorbikes, selling them for nearly 7.5 g (0.26 ounces) of gold. With the money, they went to Tây Ninh and bought two AK rifles. After coming back to Thủ Đức, Phước and Sơn, each armed with a folding-stock AK rifle, would ride out together on a motorbike to search for victims. On the night of 15 August, in Thuận An, Bình Dương province, they stopped a motorbike carrying a married couple, shot the husband dead and seriously wounded the wife. A few days later, at the end of August, while he was driving another accomplice on a motorbike, they encountered a roadblock set up by the Thủ Đức District Police. He managed to escape the police, then sold his motorbike for 26.3 g (0.93 ounces) of gold and went back to Buôn Ma Thuột City to rent a house, disguising himself as a coffee plantation worker. During the day, Phước stayed indoors, only going out at night to commit crimes to get money for his expenses.

On 1 October 1995, Phước broke into a house to steal money. However, the owner Hóa Công Hoàng and his family got home earlier than Phước expected. Phước then pointed a gun at Hoàng, and ordered him to use his motorbike to drive Phước away. After travelling about 50 meters, Hoàng suddenly let go of the handlebars and spun around, causing both of them to fall. Phước fired but only grazed Hoàng's neck and deafened him. Hoàng managed to hold Phước, the gun getting stuck between them. A few minutes later, neighbors arrived to assist Hoàng and his wife, disarming Phước before handing him over to the police.

At the police station, Phước called himself Tâm. He had no identification papers, and had had three bullets in his pocket and an AK-47 rifle when he was caught. Seeing his eight fingers and the eagle tattoo on his back, the police immediately identified him. On 29 April 1996, 13 defendants in Phước's robbery gang, himself included, were tried at the Hồ Chí Minh City People's Court. Phước received his second death sentence, and was executed by firing squad in Long Bình.

== Grave ==
Phước was buried next to the Long Bình execution ground; his grave was considered by a gravedigger of the execution ground as the "most magnificent and dignified" compared to the others. The tomb was built by money from those who had received his "good fortune" that he supposedly brings in lottery.

On 29 April 1997, one year after his death, Phước's henchmen came and demanded to exhume his body and take it away. However, when they opened the coffin, the stench of death was said to be "so strong that they all fled in panic". Due to growing rumors about his corpse being sacred, some gamblers and gangsters have reportedly prayed and performed rituals at his grave due to beliefs that it brings good fortune and lottery luck. They tended to arrive in groups, at midnight and by car. The increasing activity surrounding this practice has prompted local authorities to implement measures, including the deployment of guards in this area.

== Personal life ==
During a reconnaissance mission to prepare for a new operation, Phước met a girl with whom he later fell in love. Being rejected by her several times and knowing she already had a fiance, Phước approached her one night and threatened to harm her family. Terrified by Phước's threats, she cancelled her engagement with her future husband and became his wife. The rumors among the underworld claimed that, instead of his wedding attire, he went to his wife's parents' house and asked for her hand in marriage with a gun; however, she said that the story was "completely untrue".

After the execution of Phước, she gave birth to their first daughter.
