= Chí Hòa Prison =

Prison in Ho Chi Minh City, Vietnam

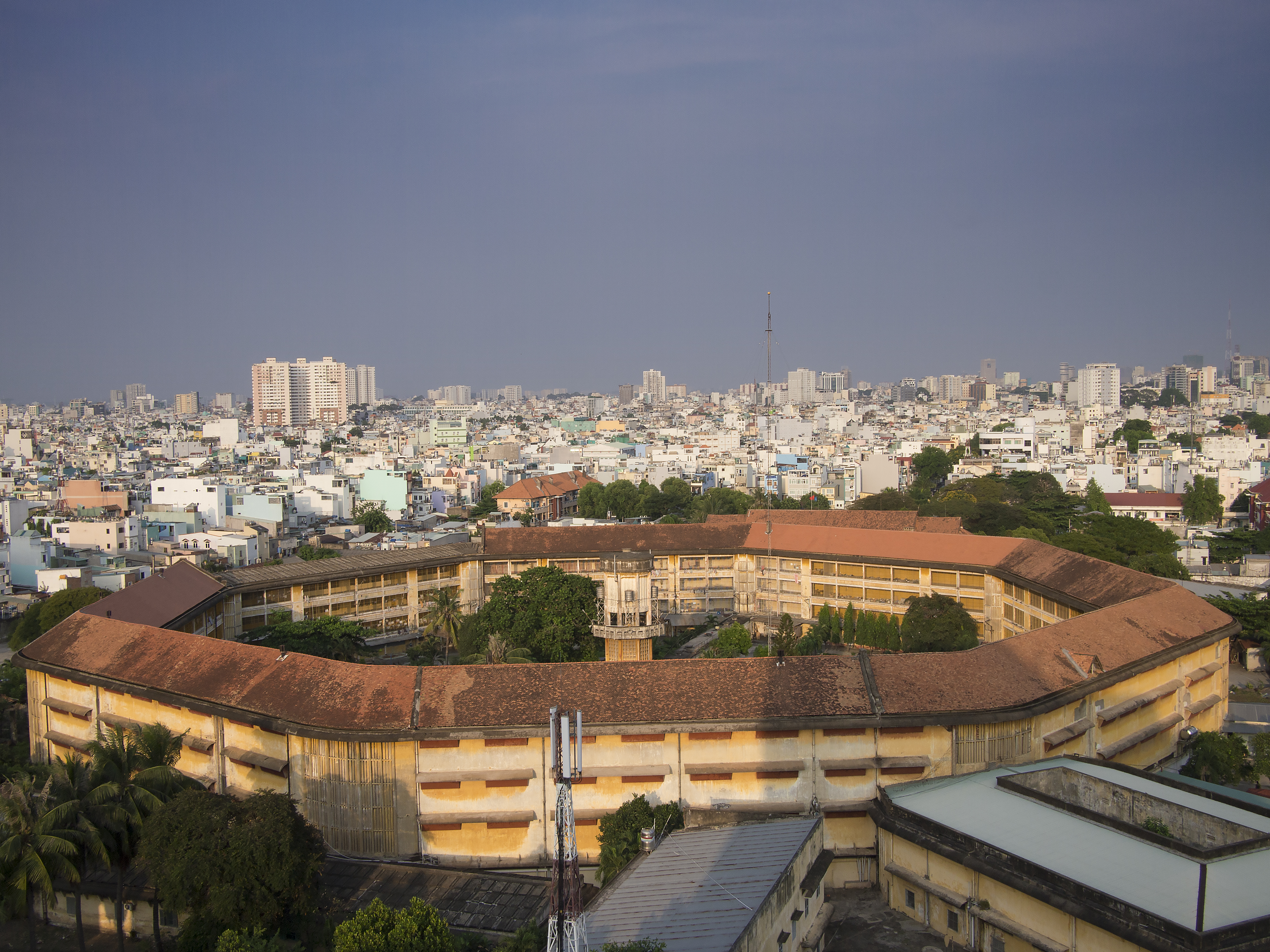
- The prison in 2016
- Interactive map of Chí Hòa Prison
- Location: Hòa Hưng ward, Hồ Chí Minh City; 10.7769°N 106.669°E
- Status: Operational
- Security class: High
- Opened: 1953

Chí Hòa Prison (Vietnamese: Khám Chí Hòa or Nhà Tù Chí Hòa) is a prison located in Ho Chi Minh City, Vietnam. The prison is an octagonal building on a 7-hectare site consisting of detention rooms, jail cells, prison walls, watchtowers, facilities and prisoner's farmlands. The prison is one of 12 national prisons in Vietnam. Originally built by the French Indochina colonial government in 1943 (or 1939) to replace the Saigon Grand Prison, the prison was extensively used by all succeeding governments of Vietnam. Due to its complex and effective architecture, the prison is considered one of the highest security prisons in Vietnam as there were only two successful prison breaks in its history.

== History ==
In the 1930s, the 1890 French-built Saigon Grand Prison (Maison Centrale de Saigon) became overcrowded because of the increasing number of prisoners at that time. This situation prompted the French Indochina government to build a new and larger prison. In 1939 (or 1943, depending on various sources), the government began the construction of Chi Hoa prison by hiring French contractors and using the design of local Vietnamese architects. In 1945, the construction was interrupted by the Empire of Japan overthrowing of the French. After the return of the French in 1950, the construction was resumed and the building process was completely finished in 1953.

After the completion of Chí Hòa prison, Emperor Bảo Đại decided to permanently shut down the Grand Prison and transferred all prisoners to the new prison. From this point on, the government of the State of Vietnam (later Republic of Vietnam) used the prison extensively.

After the fall of Saigon in 1975, the new Socialist Republic of Vietnam government has continued to use this prison until the present day. In 2010, the Ho Chi Minh city government announced a plan to demolish the prison and build a new corporative housing over the prison's land.

== Architecture ==
The prison's main structure is a three-floor octagonal building, heavily influenced by the I Ching's eight trigrams theory. The whole building is actually formed by seven tile-roofed building lines and one flat-roofed north-facing building line which are named in turn following these names of I Ching's eight trigrams. The exterior side and the interior side were built differently. The exterior side is closed by air-holed brick walls and the interior side is opened by a roofless green space from which the prisoners are separated by iron pales. Later, eight building lines are divided as areas which named alphabetically as A area, B area, C area, D area, E area, F area, G area, and H area. These areas are combined into 6 zones which are named as AB zone, BC zone, ED zone, FG zone, AH zone, and ID zone. The zones contain 238 cells:

- The AB zone: 52 cells
- The ID zone: 17 cells
- The security zone (solitary confinement zone): 3 cells
- The D zone: 65 narrow cells
- The remaining zones: 101 cells.

In the center of the prison, there is a large water tower that doubles as the main watchtower, allowing the prison guards a clear view of all the prison cells. Apart from prison cells, the main building also has the facilities for prisoners, prison managers and guards.

Later, a Christian chapel and Buddhist temple was built in the land surrounding the main building but later destroyed. There also are small farmland lots and facilities such as a restaurant and toilets for prisoners in this land. The outermost part of the prison is separated from the populous residential areas by a squared brick wall plus barbed-wire fence. There are four watchtowers in the four corners of the walls.

== Prison operation ==
The prison has been infamous for its harsh and squalid conditions for a very long time, regardless of its operators. In the time of the French colonial government, the prisoners were confined in the light-lacking cells and were usually fettered.

In the time of South Vietnam, the prison usually held from 6,000, 8,000 or even 10,000 prisoners. Chí Hòa was one of four official South Vietnamese national prisons. These prisoners were divided into two groups by their convicted crimes: the first group were prisoners who were convicted of politically related crimes and the second group were prisoners who were convicted of other crimes. The males and females were confined in different cells and the prisoners could only leave their cells briefly to satisfy their needs for food and hygiene. There was always one battalion of police guarding the prison. In spite of being only a prison, two executions were carried out in Chí Hòa prison: the execution of Ngô Đình Cẩn and the execution of Nguyễn Văn Trỗi.

After the fall of Saigon, the prison was kept running by the new Socialist Republic of Vietnam government but there is only little information in regards to the way it was being operated. There is some brief information in The Black Book of Communism which describes the conditions of the prison as extremely bad.

The prison is also infamous for its high security. However, there have been two successful prison breaks in the past: the first one occurred in 1945 when the Viet Minh took advantage of the defeat of Japan in World War II to attack and free its members from an incomplete and ill-guarded Chi Hoa prison, while the second one involved robber Nguyễn Hữu Thành, also known as "Eight-Fingered Phước", on March 27, 1995. He evaded police for more than 200 days before being recaptured in 1996 and executed two years later.

== Notable prisoners ==
=== Pre-1975 ===
- Lam Sơn, ROV general
- Ngô Đình Cẩn, politician
- Nguyễn Tường Tam, writer
- Nguyễn Văn Trỗi
- Phan Khắc Sửu, politician
- Trần Ngọc Châu, politician
- Trương Đình Dzũ, politician
- Võ Thị Sáu
- Vũ Hồng Khanh, politician
- Vũ Vũ Gia, ROV general

=== Post-1975 ===
- Nguyễn Hữu Thành (or "Eight-Fingered Phước"), robber
- Phan Huy Quát, ROV politician
- Lee Dae-yong, South Korean diplomat

== See also ==
- Côn Đảo Prison
