= Nguyễn Văn Minh Tiến =

- Born: 1974 (age 50–51); Sài Gòn, Republic of Vietnam
- Occupation: Electronic repairman
- Known for: Catching criminals in Ho Chi Minh City

Nguyễn Văn Minh Tiến (born 1974) is an electronic repairman in Tân Phú District, Ho Chi Minh City, Vietnam, known for his efforts in apprehending criminals. Since 1997, he has been involved in over 1,000 pursuits and arrests of thieves and robbers, earning him nicknames such as "Tiến Cọp" (Tiger Tiến), "hiệp sĩ đường phố" (street knight), and "Lục Vân Tiên" after a famous Vietnamese hero.

== Early life ==
Nguyễn Văn Minh Tiến was born in 1974 in Sài Gòn (now Ho Chi Minh City), during the time of the Republic of Vietnam. Nguyễn Văn Minh Tiến served as a conscript in the border guard forces at Sài Gòn Port from 1992 to 1994.

== Career ==
Tiến works as an electronic repairman but has dedicated much of his time to patrolling the streets of Ho Chi Minh City to combat crime. He began his vigilante activities in 1997 and has since chased and captured criminals in hundreds of incidents. By 2008, he had been involved in over 300 arrests. His efforts have continued, with reports indicating nearly 1,000 pursuits by 2022. He has formed a group of like-minded individuals, growing to 18 members, who patrol high-crime areas. The Ho Chi Minh City police have equipped his motorcycle with a priority siren to aid in pursuits. Tiến has faced numerous dangers, including injuries from accidents and attacks by criminals using knives, chili powder, and other weapons. In one incident, he was exposed to HIV risk after being scratched while subduing a suspect. Despite offers of bribes, such as 100 million VND in one case, Nguyễn Văn Minh Tiến has remained committed to justice. His actions have inspired others, though he has faced controversies, including accusations of fraud that were later cleared.

== Awards and recognition ==
Tiến has received numerous commendations from authorities. Former Prime Minister Võ Văn Kiệt called him a "hero in the battle against criminals" and presented him with an award at a national conference in 2005. He has been honored by the Ho Chi Minh City police and other organizations for his contributions to public security.
