= Sex trafficking in Vietnam =

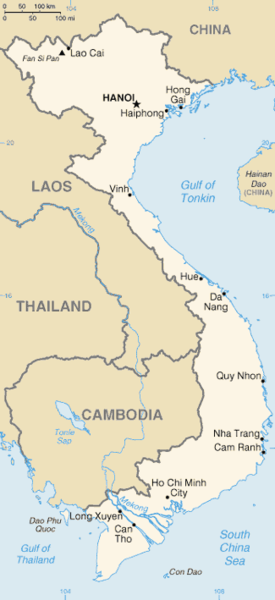

Sex trafficking in Vietnam is human trafficking for the purpose of sexual exploitation and slavery that occurs in the Socialist Republic of Vietnam. Vietnam is a source and, to a lesser extent, destination country for sexually trafficked persons.

Sex trafficking victims in the country are from many ethnic groups in Vietnam. Vietnamese citizens, primarily women and girls, have been sex trafficked into other countries in Asia and there have been cases of even in different continents such as Europe. They are often forced into prostitution, and marriages. Victims are threatened and physically and psychologically harmed. Some contract sexually transmitted diseases from rapes, abuse and malnutrition are common. Some women and girls are tortured and or murdered.

Male and female perpetrators come from a wide range of backgrounds and a number are members of or facilitated by organized crime syndicates and gangs.

The extent of sex trafficking in Vietnam is difficult to determine due to factors such as limited data, the clandestine nature of trafficking activities, challenges in victim identification, and other related issues. Efforts to enforce sex trafficking laws and investigate cases have been commonly in the past affected by challenges including corruption, insufficient cooperation between sectors, border management issues, and gaps in anti-trafficking legislation, though the government is actively trying to combat it. Passing several laws to combat sex trafficking, including the 2015 Law on Preventing and Combating Human Trafficking. Which criminalises trafficking for exploitation, and protecting victims through rehabilitation and legal support and the 2015 Penal Code, which severely criminalises trafficking giving harsh sentences for trafficking minors and to organised crime groups who do so commonly the death penalty. The code ensures victim are provided protection, rehabilitation services, and compensation. It also emphasises international cooperation and sets out the responsibilities of various government bodies and NGOs. The National Plan of Action (2016-2020) improves coordination and prosecution efforts, while the country adheres to the United Nations Palermo Protocol, the Protocol to Prevent, Suppress and Punish Trafficking in Persons, Especially Women and Children. Despite these laws, enforcement challenges are still ongoing.

Additionally, the increased regional integration under the Association of South East Asian Nations which allows for freer movement of trade and capital, may present new challenges in addressing sex trafficking.

== History ==
Cantonese outlaw bandit pirates in the Guangdong maritime frontier with Vietnam in the 17th, 18th and 19th centuries frequently kidnapped and raped Vietnamese women and Vietnamese boys.

Vietnamese women and girls were mass trafficked from Vietnam to China during French colonial rule by Chinese and Vietnamese pirates and agencies. French Captain Louis de Grandmaison claimed that these Vietnamese women ‘did not want to go back to Vietnam and they had families in China and were better off in China’. Vietnamese women were in demand because of a lower number of Chinese women available in China and along the borderlands of China there were many Chinese men who had no women and needed Vietnamese women. Vietnamese women in the Red River delta were taken to China by Chinese recruitment agencies as well as Vietnamese women who were kidnapped from villages which were raided by Vietnamese and Chinese pirates. The Vietnamese women became wives, prostitutes, or slaves.

Vietnamese women were viewed in China as "inured to hardship, resigned to their fate, and in addition of very gentle character" so they were wanted as concubines and servants in China and the massive traffick of Tongkinese (North Vietnamese) women to China started in 1875. There was massive demand for Vietnamese women in China. Southern Chinese ports were the destination of the children and women who were kidnapped by Chinese pirates from the area around Haiphong in Vietnam. Children and pretty women were taken by the pirates in their raids on Vietnamese villages. A major center for human trafficking of the slaves was Hai Phong. The Vietnamese children and women were kidnapped and brought to China to become slaves by both Chinese and Vietnamese pirates.

Mung, Meo, Thai, and Nung minority women in Tonkin's mountains were kidnapped by Vietnamese pirates and Chinese pirates to bring to China. The anti-French Can Vuong rebels were the source of the Vietnamese bandits while former Taiping rebels were the source of the Chinese rebels. These Vietnamese and Chinese pirates fought against the French colonial military and ambushed French troops, receiving help from regular Chinese soldiers to fight against the French. Chinese and Nung pirates fought against Meo. The T'ai hated the Viet Minh and fought against them in 1947. Nung were said to be fit for banditry and piracy.

Brothels in Bangkok bought kidnapped Vietnamese women fleeing South Vietnam after the Vietnam war who were taken by pirates.

== Victims ==
Vietnamese women predominantly ethnic minorities and girls are sex trafficked into China, Hong Kong, Cambodia, Malaysia, the Philippines, Taiwan, South Korea and other nations. They are forced into prostitution or marriages, as well as unfree labour in homes and on farms. A number of women are raped so they become pregnant and are forced to be surrogates. Some women and girls have been trafficked to groups of men, who are poor and pool their money together to buy one wife. Forced prostitutes are raped in brothels, massage parlors, karaoke bars, and other establishments. They are kept under strict surveillance and it is not uncommon for them to be guarded and/or tied or locked up. A number of victims are drugged.

Minorities in poverty with little education and awareness of trafficking, as well as children, are the most predominant and vulnerable to sex trafficking in Vietnam.

Victims face social stigma after escaping or being rescued. Some are reluctant to report traffickers to the local authorities because they fear reprisal from the criminals.

Vietnamese victims have been sex trafficked to businesses catering to people seeing the Southeast Asian Games and other sporting events.

== Perpetrators ==
The perpetrators are often members of or collude with organised criminal groups. There has been cases of perpetrators being corrupt government officials, corrupt military officers or enlisted men, and corrupt police who are bribed by organised crime. Loan sharks have been involved in sex trafficking as well and take advantage of debt bondage to control their victims. Perpetrators are motivated by monetary incentives. A number of perpetrators are coerced victims of trafficking themselves.

Perpetrators use the internet for cybersex trafficking crimes and the production and sale of child pornography. They also use cryptocurrencies to help hide their identity.

Some sex traffickers pose as police officers to gain victims' trust. Traffickers use chat sites and social networks such as Facebook and Zalo, a popular Vietnamese messaging app. Traffickers threaten victims' families to ensure submission.

== Government response problems ==
The government had inadequate re-integration services, therapeutic support, legal and financial assistance, and education for victims. Limited protections are available for women and girls returned to their homes.

== Non-governmental organizations ==
Blue Dragon Children's Foundation rescues and restores sex trafficked victims in the country. It is supported by the United Nations Trust Fund for Victims of Human Trafficking.

Pacific Links Foundation is an organization working to end sex trafficking in Vietnam through education and economic empowerment.
