= Khánh Trắng =

Vietnamese mobster

Dương Văn Khánh
- Born: Dương Văn Khánh; 1956; Hanoi, North Vietnam
- Died: October 13, 1998 (aged 41–42); Cầu Ngà, Hanoi, Vietnam
- Cause of death: Execution by firing squad
- Other name: Khánh Trắng
- Occupations: President of the Dong Xuan Labor Union, Crime boss
- Criminal charges: Murder, Robbery, Tax evasion, Concealment of Crime
- Penalty: Death

Khánh Trắng (literally translated as "White Khanh") was the President of the Dong Xuan Labor Union. However, it was just a screen for his mob-like organization in the underworld of Hanoi during the late 1990s. Described as a cold-blooded assassin with an elegant appearance, Khanh Trang was the president of the Labor Union during his heyday, in which he ruled the trading in Dong Xuan market area (Hanoi). He also used his influence to fuel his other crimes, such as extortion from the traders and businesses in the market, murder and tax evasion. His nickname (White Khanh) simply derived from his fair complexion.

== Early life ==
Khanh Trang was born as Duong Van Khanh in 1956 to a large family of which he was the youngest of eleven siblings. His father had 3 different wives, while his mother also had 3 different husbands, so he and his siblings were a part of three separate families. His brother and father were well-educated and earn an honest living. It is said that when his father was still alive, Khanh was never acknowledged as a member of the Duong family. From a young age, Khanh lived with his mother and his half-sister on Kim Ma street (Ba Dinh district, Hanoi). The Duong family was poor though, and they relied mainly on state subsidies to survive. Khanh had four brothers who shared the same mother with him. Three of them had been arrested several times for theft and assault. Khanh studied through the fifth grade before he eventually dropped out of school. Later, he worked at Sao Vang rubber factory for 8 months.

Between quitting his job to 1989, Khanh committed several offenses and was released from prison after serving 5 convictions. In 1989, Khanh purchased many pedicabs, which he used to transport goods around Long Bien bridge to pay daily rent. From there, Khanh began to form a gang of about three dozen juniors, all of whom were criminals, to transport goods in order to make a living. Around the same time in the area of Dong Xuan market and the surrounding areas, several other gangs began to drive pedicabs to transport goods as well. When Khanh's gang grew stronger, Khanh quickly occupied the areas of Tran Nhat Duat and Hang Chieu in order to expand the influence of his gang. This was considered a risky and clever move of Khanh.

== Become the president of the Worker’s Union and rule over Dong Xuan market ==
In early 1991, the People's Committee of Dong Xuan promulgated the policies for the loading and unloading of goods in Dong Xuan market. Thus, Khanh went asked for permission to form a team of self-loading and unloading services in the area. The People's Committee agreed and set up a team, appointing Khanh as their leader, with deputies Nguyen Van Son and Nguyen Van Tuan becoming Khanh's right-hand men.

Three months later, the People's Committee of Hoan Kiem district gave Khanh permission to handle the loading and unloading services in the market. By 1992, Dong Xuan union and the Labor Union were established as the first non-state trade organization in Hanoi. Khanh was later elected as the chairman of the Worker's Union. When Khanh officially became the chairman of Dong Xuan Worker's Union (with about 500 people), small-time traders within Dong Xuan market and traders from other markets often saw Khanh riding a jeep with several bodyguards.

At first, the team's handling of loading and unloading services was quite nice, and they even received praise by government leaders who saw the organization as a good example to follow. However, Khanh thought Dong Xuan market area didn't have enough room for business, so he sought to expand his influence to other areas. Misusing his power as the chairman of the Worker's Union, Khanh became a dictator around the Dong Xuan region, as he forced the businesses there to pay taxes and punished whoever didn't abide by his draconian policies. Khanh also prevented any other groups from loading and unloading their cargos of goods within the region, allowing only members of his union to do so, and even then the members were forced to give him the entire proceeds from the cargo load. Small businesses that refused to allow Khanh's officers to load their goods were physically beaten by the gang. Particularly, the gang even robbed right in front of a store owner without interference from the bystanders, who feared retaliation if they spoke up.

In 1994, there was a great fire in Dong Xuan market, which significantly reduced the activity of the businesses in the area. As a result, Khanh began to encroach to the areas around the bus station and Long Bien market, which was under the control of Hung Cuba. Khanh attempted to negotiate with Hung Cuba for control over these areas, but the two didn't come to an agreement. In response, Khanh had his men block all of the routes to the bus station and Long Bien market. Unable to transport or receive any of his goods from shippers, Hung Cuba was forced to submit to Khanh's will.

In order to legalize his operations, Khanh developed the trade unions in Hung Cuba's group and then merged the two trading organizations together, allowing him to transport goods from Dong Xuan and Long Bien markets. With his cover in place, Khanh continued to break the law, such as setting up a group of men to inspect other nearby trading groups, punish small traders, and fine business owners alongside Dong Xuan - Long Bien markets. The group set the fines themselves, after which the proceeds were delivered to Khanh.

However, by using his ill-gotten gains for charitable acts, Khanh earned a good reputation as a kind-hearted benefactor, which helped him to conceal his illegal activities.

== Murder at 44th Hang Chieu ==
One of the most publicized cases of Khanh's murders was the murder of Dat at 44th Hang Chieu, Hanoi. At that time, Dat was a trader at Dong Xuan market area who sold hats for a living. He soon came into conflict with Tran Dai Duong, a member of the Worker's Union who was appointed as a captain of the organization by Khanh. In the afternoon of 24 March 1991, Dat stabbed Duong with a knife but didn't seriously wound him, after which Dat fled from the market. Duong chased after Dat but was stopped by Nguyen Van Hung - Dat's brother - and other traders in the area. Duong later stayed up to inform Khanh about the incident.

With Dat's knife in hand, Khanh ordered his men to carry Dat onto the pedicab to bring him to the police station in Dong Xuan and bring Duong to the hospital as well. However, when they arrived at the police station, Dat was dead. That night, Khanh summoned the young men who were involved in the fight to his mother's home on Ton Duc Thang street, where he threatened them to pin the blame on Vu Quoc Dung as the one who robbed Dat's knife and killed him. Vu Quoc Dung confessed to the murder, and the police dropped the case for several years until Khanh's arrest in 1996.

== Tax investigation ==
Though Khanh was extremely wealthy, he did not imburse any taxes or fees to the State. When the Tax Department of Hoan Kiem requested to declare the turnover and tax payment to the State, Khanh ordered one of his men to handle the tasks. At the Long Bien area, he neither declared nor paid his taxes.

From 1994 to May 1996, Khanh reported to the Tax Department that the revenue from his earnings was over 740 million VND, thus he ended up paying only the total turnover tax and income tax for 3 years of over 62 million VND. Meanwhile, during the search of Khanh's house after his arrest, public security agencies obtained documents which proved that his revenue in 8 days was nearly 110 million. In other words, his revenue was nearly 14 million VND per day.

Later, according to the calculation of Hanoi Tax Department, from 1992 to May 1996, Khanh's total revenue was over 5.5 billion. Khanh had deceived the tax department by not reporting his turnovers by more than 4.8 billion VND, evading taxes of more than 350 million VND in total.

== Arrest and Execution ==
On 24 May 1996, Khanh Trang and several members of his organization were arrested at Khanh's house on Nguyen Thiep street in Hanoi. In trial, Khanh was charged with murder, robbery, tax evasion and concealment of crime. According to the law, Khanh had to be sentenced to death for the crimes and was ordered to pay the State nearly 3.9 billion VND. On 13 October 1998, Duong Van Khanh was executed by firing squad at Cau Nga shooting range in Hanoi.
