= Dung Hà =

Vietnamese female gangster (1965–2000)

- Born: Vũ Thị Hoàng Dung; 1965; Haiphong, North Vietnam
- Died: October 2, 2000 (aged 34–35); Ho Chi Minh City, Vietnam
- Cause of death: Gunshot wound, homicide
- Resting place: Ninh Hải Cemetery, Dương Kinh district, Haiphong (before 2015); Thủy Nguyên, Haiphong (from 2015)
- Occupation: Crime boss
- Opponents: Nam Cam's Gang; Son Bach Tang's Gang; Other gangs from Hanoi, Namdinh, and Haiphong

Vũ Thị Hoàng Dung (better known by her nickname Dung Hà; 1965 – October 2, 2000) was a Vietnamese female gangster. Born and raised in Haiphong, Dung Hà was a high-ranking criminal member in the city, and during her peak in the 1990s, she and Năm Cam were considered as the two great mob bosses of the Vietnamese underworld. On October 2, 2000, Dung Hà was assassinated under orders from Năm Cam, who had previously been in a feud with Dung Hà in Saigon. This event eventually led to the destruction of Năm Cam and his gang by the police and authorities, as Cam was later sentenced to death for ordering her murder.

== Early life ==
Dung Hà was born and raised in Hải Phòng on Trạng Trình street, Hồng Bàng district as the youngest daughter of her family. The street on which she lived on was near the edge of the bustling Iron Market (Chợ Sắt), which at the time was one of the busiest sectors in the port city of Hải Phòng, with many businesses lined up selling wares such as shrimp paste and dried fish. The street was also near both the local bus station and the ferry terminal, giving young Dung Hà exposure to the complicacy of society, such as seeing crimes like theft and witnessing gangsters wandering the streets from an early age. Dung herself was said to have been free-spirited and wild in her youth, and from early on she dropped out of school and quickly became a female gangster near the Tam Bạc bus station.

Following the footsteps of a number of brothers and sisters, Dung Hà took on the job of pickpocketing and robberies to make a living. In the middle of 1986, while robbing a pedestrian walking on the street in the Iron Market, Dung Hà was caught and arrested, where she then later spent 12 months in prison for the crime. She was 21 years old at the time. This did not change her behavior though, and when she was released from prison, she became increasingly involved in the criminal underworld.

=== Gang life and romantic hardships ===
Dung Hà was acquainted with and loved Hùng "the warbler", who was a reputable gang boss in the areas around the bus station and cargo gathering areas alongside the Tam Bạc bus station. The love story between Dung Hà and Hùng gradually became famous over time, especially amongst those living in the underworld. However, when the money began to pour into the bag, Hùng "warbler" began to fall. It was not until Hùng Warbler utterly obliterated the business at the Tam Bạc bus station that Dung Hà finally decided to leave his side.

At age 26, Dung Hà became familiar with and fell in love with another man named Hùng Cốm. Hùng Cốm however was also a famous gangster in the Haiphong area between 1985 and 1990, where it was said that no one could defeat him in the area. Along with her lover Hùng Cốm, Dung Hà started opening up casinos in the area, as the two went on a mass crime spree in the area.

After Hùng Cốm was arrested, sentenced to death and transferred to a solitary cell for death row inmates at the Hải Phòng detention center, Dung Hà went to the outside of the prison and hatched a bold escape plan against the Trần Phú detention center; using a grenade to intimidate the supervisors within the prison walls, Dung brought alongside a dozen of her followers to block the road and make way for Hùng Cốm to escape to the sea, where a train was waiting to take him to Hong Kong. The grenades however failed to explode and the plan failed miserably. Hùng Cốm was later executed by firing squad after the escape attempt. Despite the failure, Dung Hà's action and devotion to her lover gained her many admirers, and the name “Dung Hà” became more and more notorious within the port city.

=== Affair with a woman ===
With the death of her former lover Hùng Cốm, Dung Hà fell in love with a girl who was among her disciples. The people of Hải Phòng at the time soon became used to seeing pictures of Dung Hà with her hair cut short like a man, along with her dressed in men's clothing, riding a Ringbell motorcycle on the street.

However, Dung Hà's affair with this girl was abruptly interrupted in 1995 when Dung Hà was arrested and sentenced to 7 years in prison. After serving 3 years of the sentence, Dung Hà was finally released. She was now free, but now her criminal business was no longer as favorable as before because of increased police scrutiny. With her business over, Dung Hà decided to take her business to the south into Saigon.

In the late 1990s, Dung Hà of the north and Năm Cam of the south were considered as the two great powers of the Vietnamese black society or underworld.

== Feud with Năm Cam ==
Knowing of Hải “Bánh”, a mobster from the north who migrated to the south to join forces with Năm Cam's and became incredibly wealthy in the process, Dung Hà decided to do the same. Năm Cam had hoped to get Dung Hà to serve as his emissary in expanding his illicit casino business, but Dung Hà had other intentions, trying to forge her own gang in Saigon. Dung Hà started to cause disruptions to Năm Cam's business by ordering her members to disrupt the Monaco dance business of Năm Cam; the two groups then clashed with one another at a casino near the Cave Bridge (Cầu Hang) in Biên Hòa, Đồng Nai province and other casinos belonging to Cam.

On the night of September 9, 2000, Dung Hà continued to cause trouble, this time at the Phi Thuyền (Spaceship) dance floor, now is place of IFC One Saigon, organized by Hải Bánh by holding a fake birthday party and then having her members throw shrimp sauce, human feces and snakes onto the dance floor. Năm Cam was furious in response, calling Dung Hà a thorn in his eye as he then ordered Hải Bánh to go find Dung Hà.

== Assassination ==
On the night of October 1, 2000, two assassins were directed by a phone call from Hải Bánh to go find Dung Hà. When the assassins found the female gang boss playing in front of the karaoke at 17 Bùi Thị Xuân Street in Bến Thành, District 1, Ho Chi Minh City, one of the assassins went up to Dung Hà, pulled out a 9mm revolver and shot her at point-blank range in the head, killing her. Dung Hà's death however would later lead to the downfall of Hải Bánh and Năm Cam's gang, which was later destroyed by the authorities in a series of persecutions that resulted in Năm Cam and several members involved receiving the death penalty for the murder of Dung Hà. Dung Hà's body was later taken back up to the northern where members of the Hải Phòng criminal underworld delivered her funeral service from Trạng Trình street (where Dung once lived) to the Haiphong Opera House.

== Legacy ==
Many people in Vietnam, especially in Haiphong considered the night that Dung Hà was shot as a “historical night”. Even until now, people in the port city still think that the gang boss's funeral was unique both in terms of the monumental level and the number of participants. Dung Hà's funeral in a way reminded the people of the mafia godfather's funeral in the world. Many monks and teachers were invited to the funeral to pray for Dung Hà, whose coffin was decorated with flowers. Along the road to the funeral at Dung Hà's house, the younger brothers of her gang stood in two columns, all dressed in black uniform. The disciples of Dung Hà and the many mourners who came were dressed in black vests, with white roses on the chest, eyes wearing dark glasses, and were riding in a black car during the funeral procession.
