= Đại Cathay =

Saigon mobster

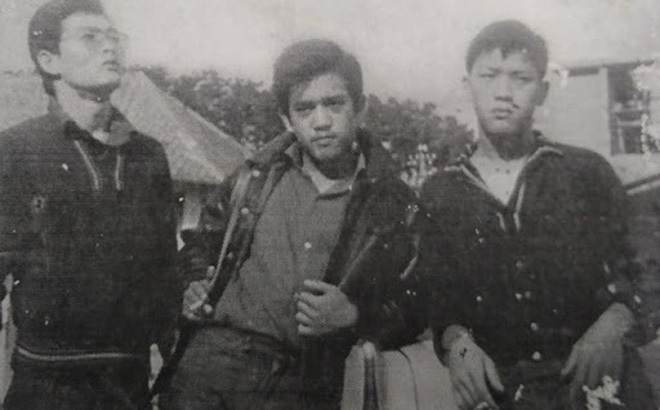
- Born: Lê Văn Đại; 1940; Saigon, French Cochinchina
- Died: January 7, 1967 (aged 26–27); Phú Quốc, Kiên Giang, South Vietnam
- Occupation: Crime boss
- Known for: One of the "Four Great Kings" of Saigon

Đại Cathay, whose real name was Lê Văn Đại, was a 1960s Saigon mobster, and was considered as the top of the "four great kings" of Saigon's criminal underworld before 1975, followed by Huỳnh Tỳ, Ngô Văn Cái and Ba Thế.

== Early life ==
Đại Cathay was born in 1940 as the son of Lê Văn Cự, who was a gangster in the market area of Cầu Muối. After 1945, Đại's father became a revolutionary and joined the Bình Xuyên army to fight against the French, where his father served under his leader Ba Dương. In 1946, his father was captured and exiled to Côn Đảo prison, where he later died.

After his father's death, Đại's mother eventually married a gambler who was also a drug addict. The family then moved to Đỗ Thành Nhân street, located within the fourth district, which at the time was flooded with people who had quit the countryside to the city. It was also where the Saigon mafia ran their illegal operations. On top of that, Đại was treated badly by his stepfather. Shortly thereafter, he dropped out of school and became a shoe shiner and sold newspapers at the Nguyễn Công Trứ and Công Lý crossroads (now Nam Kỳ Khởi Nghĩa) in order to survive. In the area where Đại was selling newspapers, there was also a cinema named Cathay, with the streets around it being a common fighting grounds for the local street boys. Đại fought many times on this street, and was rumored to have never lost a fight, gaining him his namesake "Đại Cathay of Nguyễn Công Trứ street".

As a youth wandering around the markets of Saigon in the 4th ward, Đại stole melons and bananas from the local produce, which he would then share with the many local street kids that he had befriended. Eventually, Đại gained a following of street youths around him, but unlike many other gang leaders, Đại was well known for his generosity and looking out for his henchmen, always keeping as little to himself as possible while sharing the rest with his gang. He also never punished members who didn't bring in enough money to the gang, a trait uncommon for gang leaders. It was through this that Đại earned the respect of his fellow peers as the size of his gathering grew.

However, Đại and his gang were constantly involved in bloody fights with rival gang factions. On one occasion, while in the second district, because Đại refused to name members of his gang that had been involved in a fight, a group of uniformed police officers forced him to kneel on the ground and swallow a live cockroach in front of his crew, which Cathay vomited in disgust. The police sent Đại to the Thủ Đức Juvenile Reformatory, notorious for being a hotbed for gangsters, where Đại later befriended some of his later comrades that would assist him during his reign of Saigon. After leaving the reformatory, Cathay returned to his old haunt near the Cathay theatre and re-established his order. Đại would proceed to later lead his gang through several clashes with the other gangs in the neighborhood that had taken control during his absence, particularly against Bé Bún's gang as Cathay later seized control over much of the 4th district, defeating all of his major rivals.

By the early 1960s, at the age of 20, Đại Cathay was quickly becoming a notorious gangster in Saigon; Đại was in control of nearly all the illicit establishments, such as prostitution houses, drug dens and night clubs in the first and third districts of Saigon. He was also becoming a familiar face around these establishments and befriended engineers, doctors and artists such as Dzach Buu, Dzi Buu and Hoang Sayonara, who would later help craft Đại's business strategy by advising him to open casinos. At around the same time, Đại began to exploit the often corrupt officials of the Saigon government by means of bribery; he was allowed to open many casinos in district 1 of Saigon, and in return, the city officials received monthly payments, which allowed Đại to ever increase his profits and control over the illegal activities in the city.

== Clash with Tín Mã Nàm ==
As Đại sought to increase and expand his criminal rackets, he eventually began to venture some of his activities into the seemingly impenetrable fifth district, Chợ Lớn, which was under the control of Tín Mã Nàm, an infamous mob leader at the time of ethnic Hoa descent who was the leader of the Chinese mafia in the area. Tín Mã Nàm had a strong physical appearance, had years of training in Shaolin Kung Fu and Choy Li Fut, and was nicknamed ngựa điên (lit. Mad Horse). He was known as Hồng Trượng within the Triad, second only to Hoàng Long (lit. Yellow Dragon), who was the leader of all the Hoa gangs in Chợ Lớn. The clash between Đại Cathay's gang and Tín Mã Nàm's had been taking place over the course of many years. At the beginning of 1964, Đại, followed by Ba Thế and Lâm Đào Già brought two cars and a dozen motorbikes with the markings Goebel, Push, Brumi, Ishia, each one carrying two people. The gang then suddenly brought out knives, swords, sticks, bayonets and simultaneously attacked the roadside shops in the Great World district. After a moment of shock, Tín Mã Nàm's gang calmed down, began shouting and ran into the bars to arm themselves with knives, swords, and nunchakus in which afterwards they then hid and counterattacked. Đại Cathay's gang was severely beaten and bloodied, and thus was forced to flee from the scene. In addition, Lâm Đào Già, one of Đại's followers during the battle was wounded and lost one of his fingers, which later earned him the nickname Lâm chín ngón (lit. Lâm nine fingers).

However, because of the gang battle, many people began to avoid Tín Mã Nàm's establishments and casinos. With his business rapidly declining, Tín Mã Nàm was desperate and so he asked to meet Đại Cathay at Đồng Khánh restaurant in order to negotiate. As a result of the negotiation, Tín Mã Nàm and the Chinese gangs in Chợ Lớn ceded away the entire areas from between Nancy market and District 1, allowing Đại to open more casinos and run a monopoly on illicit activities within those regions.

== Reaching the top of the Four Great Kings ==
At that time, besides Đại, in Saigon, there were also three major mobsters or "kings": Huỳnh Tỳ, Ngô Văn Cái and Ba Thế. As they were not pleased with Đại Cathay's rapid expansion in Saigon, so they decided to try to take down Đại in an ambush. Đại Cathay fell prey to their planned ambush where five swordsmen each pulled out their weapons and attack him, which he miraculously survived. With his wounds still unhealed, and with a single knife in hand, Đại in turn sought after the five men, who were all hunted down and wounded by Đại. Afterwards, Đại became the number one of the "four great kings" of the Saigon underworld, giving way to the famous saying: Đại - Tỳ - Cái - Thế, the names of the four mobsters who ruled Saigon.

== Disappearance/death in Phú Quốc ==
In November 1966, Đại Cathay was arrested and placed in Phú Quốc Prison after being accused of having masterminded Trần Kim Chi's death when Trần Kim Chi, a subordinate general of Nguyễn Ngọc Loan, was killed when a truck that was loaded with wood drove straight into his car. As a result, Kim Chi's general, Nguyễn Ngọc Loan had Đại Cathay arrested on "special treaty" charges.

On the 28th of that November, Đại was placed in a C47 aircraft for transportation to the prison in Phú Quốc island. In 1967, Đại hatched a plan where he had his wife bribe the guards so that he could escape from the prison. On January 7, Đại and his men escaped from the camp, but when he passed through the front gate, the alarmed sound, alerting the guards surrounding the prison. Discovered, Đại was chased to the North part of the island, but the guards never found him and he was never heard from again. As a result of his mysterious death or disappearance, two main theories emerged to explain how Đại could have met his end:

- Theory 1: Đại Cathay and his men were shot dead on the night of January 7 after they were discovered by a platoon.
- Theory 2: Đại Cathay and his men were captured by the South Vietnamese Liberation Army (Viet Cong), and when Đại and his men tried to escape, they were shot dead.

Lieutenant Trần Tử Thanh later boasted to several reporters in several newspapers before 1975 that he was the one who shot and killed Đại Cathay.

== Anecdotes and legacy ==
- When general Nguyễn Cao Kỳ asked for Đại to become his personal bodyguard, he responded that: "Wherever I go I have escorts, if I were to escort you, sir, my bodyguards would be unemployed."
- With captain Trần Kim Chi, the chief of the Republic of Vietnam National Police, one evening, Đại Cathay had paid for the Paramouth restaurant's services and specially invited Trần Kim Chi to the banquet. Đại Cathay then said: "If you, captain, pardon some of my brothers who were arrested, then we will be forever indebted to you." Trần Kim Chi responded, "Eating is eating, working is working. If you invited me to this banquet to do bargain, then I decline." "Oh no no," Đại Cathay softly replied, "if you do not accept then it is fine. Still, today you were invited here to let us enjoy ourselves. Please captain, this whole restaurant tonight is here just to serve us, so don't be worried about anything."
- Author Duyên Anh, after hearing Đại Cathay speak about his life as a gangster, and about the bloody battles out on the streets, decided to write the novel titled "Điệu ru nước mắt", translated to English as "Tale of One Teardrop" which became famous in Vietnam. The protagonist of the novel was Trần Đại, who is the character prototype of Đại Cathay. While reading the book, Đại Cathay pleasantly enjoyed the first part of the novel, with much of it being based on his own real life events. However, at the end of the novel, when the main character Trần Đại lies dying on the fence, Đại seethed with rage, shouting: "That damn Duyên Anh, how dare he play with me. I loved a woman so much that I got killed and had my body dried up on a fence? (To his men) Go find and cut off his testicles and give them to me." Upon hearing the news, Duyên Anh fled to Đà Lạt to hide until the end of 1966, when Đại Cathay was arrested by police and sent to Phú Quốc island, in which only then did Anh dare to return to Saigon.

== Cinematography ==
Duyên Anh's novel "Điệu ru nước mắt" (Lullaby of Tears) was based on the life of Đại Cathay, and the novel was later adapted into a film by the same name directed by Lê Hoàng Hoa and was acted by two famous Vietnamese actors at the time Hùng Cường and Trần Quang.
