= List of post-Soviet gangsters =

This is a list of some organized crime figures within the underworld of the former Soviet Union.

Name	Ethnicity	Nickname(s)	Comments
Sergei Mikhailov	Russian	Mikhas	The leader of the Solntsevskaya bratva
Semyon Mogilevich	Ashkenazi Jewish (Ukrainian Jewish)	Uncle Seva, the Brainy Don	Ukrainian mobster who is regarded as one of the most powerful gangsters from the former Soviet Union.
Vladimir Kumarin	Russian		Boss of the Tambov gang
Vyacheslav Ivankov	Russian	Yaponchik (the Japanese)	Notorious thief in law who later established a criminal organization in the USA.
Alexander Solonik	Russian	Superkiller, the Kurgan Terminator, Sacha the Macedonian	Infamous hitman who committed several high-profile murders.
Roman Tsepov	Russian		St Petersburg based businessman, suspected of using his security firms to run protection rackets.
Denis Sergin (Fraser)	Russian Jewish	Friz/ Nemec	Notorious leader of the Lyuberetskaya Bratva. Known for his barbaric ways of dealing with opposition. "One of the most violent and homicidal gangsters in Moscow" Robert Levinson
Maxim Lazovsky	Russian	Max	FSB agent turned gang leader, accused of being involved in the Russian apartment bombings
Marat Balagula	Ashkenazi Jewish (Ukrainian Jewish)		Was a powerful Ukrainian gangster in the USA.
Evsei Agron	Ashkenazi Jewish (Russian Jewish)		One of the first Russian gangsters to establish a powerful gang in the USA, thief in law.
Ludwig Fainberg	Ashkenazi Jewish (Ukrainian Jewish)	Tarzan	Ukrainian-Israeli drugs, arms and sex trafficker.
Boris Nayfeld	Ashkenazi Jewish (Belarusian Jewish)	Biba	Belarusian mobster who was involved in organized crime in America as well as Europe.
Rachmiel Brandwain	Ashkenazi Jewish (Ukrainian-German Jewish)		Ukrainian mobster who was based in Antwerp.
Vladimir Reznikov	Russian		Member of the Russian mafia in the USA.
Toomas Erm Wilson	Estonian	Konksu-Tom	Leader of Estonian Kemerovo crime syndicate.
Vladislav Leontyev	Russian	Belobryssy	Russian mobster and alleged member of the Brothers' Circle.
Toomas Helin	Estonian		Estonian drug lord
Imre Arakas	Estonian	The Butcher	Estonian hitman and career criminal.
Khozh-Ahmed Noukhayev	Chechen		Former leader of the Chechen mafia.
Ruslan Labazanov	Chechen		Former boss of the Chechen mafia.
Nikolay Suleimanov	Chechen	Hoza	Prominent former member of the Chechen mafia.
Akhat Bragin	Tatar	Alik the Greek	Donetsk-based crime lord and former owner of FC Shakhtar Donetsk
Haidar Zakirov	Tatar		Former leader of the Kazan mafia in Moscow.
Sergey Tsapok	Russian		Krasnodar-based gang leader, responsible for the Kushchevskaya massacre
Tariel Oniani	Georgian	Taro	Georgian crime boss, thief in law.
Jaba Ioseliani	Georgian		Former thief-in-law and leader of the Mkhedrioni militia
Merab Bakhia	Georgian	Bakha-Bakha	Powerful Georgian crime lord in Abkhazia.
Dzambo Dzambidze	Georgian	Young Jumbo	Georgian crime boss, leader of Rustavi organised crime group, thief in law.
Otari Kvantrishvili	Georgian	Otarik	Moscow-based thief in law
Lasha Shushanashvili	Georgian	Lasha Rustavsky	Prominent thief in law.
Boris Dekanidze	Georgian Jewish		Leader of Lithuanian organised crime group. Last person to be executed in that country (1995).
Armen Kazarian	Armenian	Pzo	Armenian thief in law in the USA involved in drug trafficking, extortion, etc...but most famous for the 2010 Medicaid fraud
Kamo Safaryan	Armenian		Crime boss in Moscow.
Edward Margaryan	Armenian		Armenian gangster.
Dadash Ibrahimov	Azerbaijani		Powerful gangster of Azerbaijani descent.
Rovshan Janiev	Talyshes	Rovshan Lankaransky	One of top leaders of organized crime in Russia.
Nadir Salifov	Azerbaijani	Lotu Guli	One of top leaders of organized crime in Russia.
Kamal Huseynov	Azerbaijani	Kamal Tovuzsky	Leader of powerful Azeri organized crime family in Moscow.
Arif Askerov	Azerbaijani	Arif	Leader of powerful Gardabani organized crime society in Moscow, it is consisted of ethnic Azeris from Georgia.
Mukhtarov Hikmet	Azerbaijani	Hikmet Sabirabadsky, Lotu Hikmet	Powerful Azeri mobster.
Aslan Usoyan	Yazidi Kurdish	Grandpa Hassan	Powerful thief in law in Moscow.
Zakhar Kalashov	Yazidi	Shagro Junior	Powerful Georgian thief in law
Kamchy Kolbayev	Kyrgyz	Kolya-Kyrgyz	Kyrgyz thief in law and alleged member of the Brothers' Circle
Ryspek Akmatbayev	Kyrgyz		Kyrgyz mobster who was killed in a drive-by shooting.
Bayaman Erkinbayev	Kyrgyz		Kyrgyz crime boss turned politician after 2005 coup, killed later that year.
Gafur Rakhimov	Uzbek		Alleged Uzbek organized crime figure and member of the Brothers' Circle.
Salim Abduvaliyev	Uzbek		Alleged Uzbek crime lord.
Alimzhan Tokhtakhunov	Uyghur	Taivanchik (the Taiwanese)	Alleged thief in law
Aslan Malsagov	Ingush		Leader of an Ingush criminal clan.
Alikhan Tochiev	Ingush		Leader of the Ingush 'Malgobek' mafia in Moscow.
Ruslan Agargimov	Lezgian		Leader of the Dagestani mafia in Sint-Petersburg.
Gazim Luguev	Lezgian		Leader of a Dagestani criminal gang in Moscow.
Mohammed Gadzhihanov	Avar		Leader of a Dagestani criminal gang in Moscow.
Nurullah Alumerzaev	Avar		Leader of the Dagestani Novgorod clan.
Leonid Minin	Ukrainian		
Oleg Asmakov	Ukrainian	Alex Taim and Alik Magadan	Gang leader under Solntsevskaya bratva. Main activity in Kyiv.

== See also ==
- Chechen mafia
- Criminal tattoos
- Georgian mafia
- List of mobsters by city
- Russian oligarchs
- Ukrainian oligarchs
- List of criminal enterprises, gangs and syndicates
- Russian mafia
- Thief in law
