= Russian mafia =

Umbrella term for Russian organized crime groups

- Founding location: Soviet Union
- Years active: Late 1980s–present
- Territory: Post-Soviet states, European Union, United States, Israel, Australia
- Ethnicity: Primarily Russians but also from other Post-Soviet states.
- Criminal activities: Human trafficking, racketeering, drug trafficking, extortion, murder, robbery, smuggling, arms trafficking, gambling, prostitution, pornography, money laundering, fraud, financial crime, terrorism
- Allies: Albanian mafia; American mafia; Armenian mafia; Azerbaijani mafia; Baybaşin family (Kurdish mafia); Camorra; Colombian mafia; Georgian mafia; Israeli mafia; Montenegrin mafia; Romanian mafia; Serbian mafia; Triads; Turkish mafia; Ukrainian mafia

The Russian mafia (Russian: ру́сская ма́фия, romanized: russkaya mafiya [ˈruskəjə ˈmafʲɪjə] or росси́йская ма́фия, rossiyskaya mafiya [rɐˈsʲijskəjə ˈmafʲɪjə]), also known as bratva (братва́, bratva [brɐtˈva]; lit. 'brothers' clique'), is a collective of various organized crime related elements originating in the former Soviet Union (FSU). Any of the mafia's groups may be referred to as an "Organized Criminal Group" (OPG, from Russian "организованная преступная группа"). This is sometimes modified to include a specific name, such as the Orekhovskaya OPG. Sometimes, the Russian word is dropped in favour of a full translation, and OCG is used instead of OPG.

In 2012, there were as many as 6,000 groups, with more than 200 of them having a global reach. Criminals of these various groups are either former prison members, corrupt officials and business leaders, people with ethnic ties, or people from the same region with shared criminal experiences and leaders. In December 2009, Timur Lakhonin, the head of the National Central Bureau of Interpol within Russia, stated that "Certainly, there is crime involving our former compatriots abroad, but there is no data suggesting that an organized structure of criminal groups comprising former Russians exists abroad" on the topic of international Russian criminal gangs. In August 2010, Alain Bauer, a criminologist from France, said that the Russian mafia "is one of the best structured criminal organizations in Europe, with a quasi-military operation" in their international activities.

The Russian mafia is similar to the Italian crime groups in many ways, in that the groups' organizations and structures follow a similar model. The two groups also share a similar portfolio of criminal activity. The highly publicized Sicilian Mafia is believed to have inspired early criminal groups in Russia to form mafia-like organizations, eventually spawning their own version. The Russian mafia, however, differed from the Sicilians due to their environment. The level of political corruption and arms sales in post-Soviet Russia allowed for their massive expansion, as well as the incorporation of many government officials into the crime syndicates. Russian mafia groups have also been involved in uranium trading, stolen from the Soviet nuclear program, and human trafficking, among other serious activities.

== History ==
=== Origins ===
Today's Russian organized crime can be traced back to the Russian Empire, in the form of banditry and thievery, but it was not until after the establishment of the Soviet Union that certain vory v zakone (lit. 'thieves in law') emerged as the leaders of prison groups throughout forced labour camps with a generally well-defined code of honour. In the aftermath of World War II in 1945, the death of Joseph Stalin in 1953, and the dissolution of the Soviet Union in 1991, more gangs emerged in a flourishing black market that exploited the unstable governments of the FSU. American attorney Louis Freeh, who headed the Federal Bureau of Investigation (FBI) between 1993 and 2001, said that the Russian mafia posed the greatest threat to the United States in the mid-1990s.

When the Bolshevik Revolution came around in 1917, the Thieves' World was alive and active. Vladimir Lenin attempted to wipe them out, but it failed, and the criminals survived into Joseph Stalin's reign.

=== 1917–1991: Soviet era ===
During Stalin's reign as ruler, millions of people were sent to Gulag labor camps, where powerful criminals worked their way up to become thieves in law. These criminal elites often conveyed their status through complicated tattoos, symbols still used by Russian mobsters.

After Hitler's invasion of the Soviet Union during World War II, Stalin recruited more men to fight for the nation, offering prisoners freedom if they joined the army. Many flocked to help out in the war, but this act betrayed the codes of the Thieves' World that one must not ally with the government. Those who chose not to fight in the war referred to the traitors as suka ('bitch'), and the traitors landed at the bottom of the "hierarchy". Outcasts, the suki separated from the others and formed their own groups and power bases by collaborating with prison officials, eventually gaining the luxury of comfortable positions. Bitterness between the groups erupted into a series of Bitch Wars from 1945 to 1953, with many killed every day. The prison officials encouraged the violence, seeing it as a way to rid the prisons of criminals.

Then, in the 1980s, Mikhail Gorbachev loosened restrictions on private businesses, allowing them to grow legally, but by then, the Soviet Union was already beginning to collapse.

Also during the 1970s and 1980s, the United States expanded its immigration policies, allowing Soviet Jews, with most settling in a southern Brooklyn area known as Brighton Beach (sometimes nicknamed "Little Odessa"). Here is where Russian organized crime began in the US. The earliest known case of Russian crime in the area was in the mid-1970s by the "Potato Bag Gang", a group of con artists disguised as merchants that told customers that they were selling antique gold rubles for cheap, but in fact, gave them bags of potatoes when bought in thousands. By 1983, the head of Russian organized crime in Brighton Beach was Evsei Agron.

Pauol Mirzoyan was a prime target among other mobsters, including rival Boris Goldberg and his organization, and in May 1985, Agron was assassinated. Boris "Biba" Nayfeld, his bodyguard, moved on to employ under Marat Balagula, who was believed to have succeeded Agron's authority. In the following year, Balagula fled the country after he was convicted in a fraud scheme of Merrill Lynch customers and was found in Frankfurt, West Germany, in 1989, where he was extradited back to the US and sentenced to eight years in prison.

Balagula would later be convicted on a separate $360,000 credit card fraud in 1992. Nayfield took Balagula's place, partnering with the "Polish Al Capone", Ricardo Fanchiniin, in an import-export business and setting up a heroin business. In 1990, his former friend, Monya Elson, back from a six-year prison sentence in Israel, returned to America and set up a rival heroin business, culminating in a mafia turf war.

=== 1992–2000: growth and internationalization ===
When the USSR collapsed and a free market economy emerged, organized criminal groups began to take over Russia's economy, with many ex-KGB agents and veterans of the Afghan war offering their skills to the crime bosses. Gangster summit meetings had taken place in hotels and restaurants shortly before the Soviet's dissolution, so that top vory v zakone could agree on who would rule what, and set plans on how to take over the post-communist states.

In the 1990s, in Russia and other post-Soviet countries, vast deposits of natural resources and businesses that the state had owned for decades were privatized. Former Soviet bureaucrats, factory directors, aggressive businessmen, and criminal organizations used insider deals, bribery, and simple brute force to grab lucrative assets. Businesses began building their own private armies of security agents, bodyguards, and commercial spies. They often bought the people and weapons of the former Soviet state or even those of the current Russian police. Russia's new capitalists spent millions of dollars for protection, buying armor-plated cars, bomb sensors, hidden cameras, bulletproof vests, anti-wiretapping gear, and weapons, recruiting veterans of the Afghan and Chechen wars as their bodyguards. However, almost every business in Russia, from curbside vendors to huge oil and gas companies, made payments to organized crime for protection ("krysha"). Businessmen said that they needed the "krysha" because the laws and the court system were not functioning properly in Russia. The only way for them to enforce a contract was to turn to a criminal "krysha". They also used it to intimidate competitors, enforce contracts, collect debts, or take over new markets. It was also becoming increasingly common for Russian businesses to turn to the "red krysha" (the corrupt police who doubled as a paid protection racket). Contract killings were common.

It was the period of internationalization of Russian organized crime. It was agreed that Vyacheslav "Yaponchik" Ivankov would be sent to Brighton Beach in 1992, allegedly because he was killing too many people in Russia and also to take control of Russian organized crime in North America. Within a year, he built an international operation that included but was not limited to narcotics, money laundering, and prostitution and made ties with the American Mafia and Colombian drug cartels, eventually extending to Miami, Los Angeles, and Boston.

Prior to Ivankov's arrival, Balagula's downfall left a void for America's next vory v zakone. Monya Elson, leader of Monya's Brigada (a gang that similarly operated from Russia to Los Angeles to New York), was in a feud with Boris Nayfeld, with bodies dropping on both sides. Ivankov's arrival virtually ended the feud, although Elson would later challenge his power as well, and a number of attempts were made to end the former's life. Nayfield and Elson would eventually be arrested in January 1994 (released in 1998) and in Italy in 1995, respectively.

According to FBI reports, the crime boss Semion Mogilevich had alliances with the Camorra, in particular with Salvatore DeFalco, a lower-echelon member of the Giuliano clan. Mogilevich and DeFalco would have held meetings in Prague in 1993. Semion Mogilevich's net worth is estimated to be 10 billion dollars.

Ivankov's reign also ended in June 1995 when a $3.5 million extortion attempt on two Russian businessmen, Alexander Volkov and Vladimir Voloshin, ended in an FBI arrest that resulted in a ten-year maximum security prison sentence. Before his arrest and besides his operations in America, Ivankov regularly flew around Europe and Asia to maintain ties with his fellow mobsters (like members of the Solntsevskaya Bratva), as well as reinforce ties with others. This did not stop other people from denying his growing power. In one instance, Ivankov attempted to buy out Georgian boss Valeri "Globus" Glugech's drug importation business. When the latter refused the offer, he and his top associates were shot dead. A summit held in May 1994 in Vienna rewarded him with what was left of Glugech's business. Two months later, Ivankov got into another altercation with drug kingpin and head of the Orekhovskaya gang, Segei "Sylvester" Timofeyev, ending with the latter murdered a month later.

In 1995, the Camorra cooperated with the Russian mafia in a scheme in which the Camorra would bleach out US$1 bills and reprint them as $100s. These bills would then be transported to the Russian mafia for distribution in 29 post-Eastern Bloc countries and former Soviet republics. In return, the Russian mafia paid the Camorra with property (including a Russian bank) and firearms, smuggled into Eastern Europe and Italy.

A report by the United Nations in 1995 placed the number of individuals involved in organized crime in Russia at 3 million, employed in about 5,700 gangs.

Back in Eastern Europe in May 1995, Semion Mogilevich held a summit meeting of Russian mafia bosses in his U Holubu restaurant in Anděl, a neighborhood of Prague. The excuse to bring them together was that it was a birthday party for Victor Averin, the second-in-command of the Solntsevskaya Bratva. However, Major Tomas Machacek of the Czech police got wind of an anonymous tip-off that claimed that the Solntsevskaya were planning to assassinate Mogilevich at the location (it was rumored that Mogilevich and Solntsevskaya leader Sergei Mikhailov had a dispute over $5 million), and the police successfully raided the meeting. 200 guests were arrested, but no charges were put against them; only key Russian mafia members were banned from the country, most of whom moved to Hungary.

One person who was not there was Mogilevich himself. He claimed that, "[b]y the time I arrived at U Holubu, everything was already in full swing, so I went into a neighboring hotel and sat in the bar there until about five or six in the morning." Mikhailov would later be arrested in Switzerland in October 1996 on numerous charges, including that he was the head of a powerful Russian mafia group, but was exonerated and released two years later after evidence was not enough to prove much.

The global extent of Russian organized crime was not realized until Ludwig "Tarzan" Fainberg was arrested in January 1997, primarily because of arms dealing. In 1990, Fainberg moved from Brighton Beach to Miami and opened up a strip club called Porky's, which soon became a popular hangout for underworld criminals. Fainberg himself gained a reputation as an ambassador among international crime groups, becoming especially close to Juan Almeida, a Colombian cocaine dealer. Planning to expand his cocaine business, Fainberg acted as an intermediary between Almeida and the corrupt Russian military. He helped him get six Russian military helicopters in 1993, and in the following year, helped arrange to buy a submarine for cocaine smuggling. Unfortunately for the two of them, federal agents had been keeping a close eye on Fainberg for months. Alexander Yasevich, an associate of the Russian military contact and an undercover DEA agent, was sent to verify the illegal dealing, and in 1997, Fainberg was finally arrested in Miami. Facing the possibility of life imprisonment, the latter agreed to testify against Almeida in exchange for a shorter sentence, which ended up being 33 months.

The FreeLance Bureau (FLB.ru) published a website in 2000 containing Philipp Bobkov's MOST Group Security Database along with files from RUOP and other departments and special services.

Vanuatu was a preferred location for Russian mafia laundering money.

=== 2001–present ===
As the 21st century dawned, the Russian mafia remained after the death of Aslan Usoyan. New mafia bosses sprang up, while imprisoned ones were released. Among the released were Marat Balagula and Vyacheslav Ivankov, both in 2004. The latter was extradited to Russia, but was jailed once more for his alleged murders of two Turks in a Moscow restaurant in 1992; he was cleared of all charges and released in 2005. Four years later, he was assassinated by a shot in the stomach from a sniper. Meanwhile, Monya Elson and Leonid Roytman were arrested in March 2006 for an unsuccessful murder plot against two Kyiv-based businessmen.

In 2009, FBI agents in Moscow targeted two suspected mafia leaders and two other corrupt businessmen. One of the leaders is Yevgeny Dvoskin, a criminal who had been in prison with Ivankov in 1995 and was deported in 2001 for breaking immigration regulations; the other is Konstantin "Gizya" Ginzburg, who was reportedly the current "big boss" of Russian organized crime in America before his reported assassination in 2009, it being suspected that Ivankov handed over control to him.

In the same year, Semion Mogilevich was placed on the FBI Ten Most Wanted Fugitives list for his involvement in a complex multimillion-dollar scheme that defrauded investors in the stock of his company YBM Magnex International, swindling them out of $150 million. He was indicted in 2003 and arrested in 2008 in Russia on tax fraud charges, but because the US does not have an extradition treaty with Russia, he was released on bail. Monya Elson said, in 1998, that Mogilevich is the most powerful mobster in the world.

Around the world, Russian mafia groups have popped up as dominating particular areas. Russian organized crime has a rather large stronghold in the city of Atlanta where members are distinguished by their tattoos. Russian organized crime was reported to have a stronger grip in the French Riviera region and Spain in 2010; and Russia was branded as a virtual "mafia state" according to the WikiLeaks cables.

According to recordings released in 2015, Alexander Litvinenko, shortly before he was assassinated, claimed that Semion Mogilevich has had a "good relationship" with Vladimir Putin since the 1990s.

On 7 June 2017, 33 Russian mafia affiliates and members were arrested and charged by the FBI, US Customs and Border Protection and NYPD for extortion, racketeering, illegal gambling, firearm offenses, narcotics trafficking, wire fraud, credit card fraud, identity theft, fraud on casino slot machines using electronic hacking devices; based in Atlantic City and Philadelphia, murder-for-hire conspiracy and cigarette trafficking. They were also accused of operating secret and underground gambling dens based in Brighton Beach, Brooklyn, and using violence against those who owed gambling debts, establishing nightclubs to sell drugs, plotting to force women associates to rob male strangers by seducing and drugging them with chloroform, and trafficking over 10,000 pounds of stolen chocolate confectionery; the chocolate was stolen from shipment containers. It is believed that 27 of the arrested are connected to the Russian mafia Shulaya clan which are largely based in New York.

On 26 September 2017, as part of a 4-year investigation, 100 Spanish Civil Guard officers carried out 18 searches in different areas of Málaga, Spain, related to Russian mafia large scale money laundering. The raids resulted in the arrests of 11 members and associates of the Solntsevskaya and Izmailovskaya clans. Money, firearms and 23 high-end vehicles were also seized. The owner of Marbella FC, Alexander Grinberg, and manager of AFK Sistema, a Spanish football club in Málaga, were among those arrested.

On 19 February 2018, 18 defendants were accused of laundering over $62 million through real estate, including with the help of Vladislav Reznik, former chairman of Rosgosstrakh, one of Russia's largest insurance companies. The accused stood trial in Spain. The Tambov and Malyshev Russian mafia organisations were involved.

Alexander Torshin is allegedly a high ranking Russian mafia boss.

== Structure and composition ==
In the Russian mafia, "Vor" (pl.: Vory) (lit. 'thief') is an honorary title analogous to a made man in the Sicilian and Italian-American mafia. The honor of becoming a Vor is given only when the recruit shows considerable leadership skills, personal ability, intellect, and charisma. A Pakhan or another high-ranking member of an organization can decide if the recruit will receive such title. When you become a member of the Vor-world you have to accept the code of the Vor v Zakone ('thief in law').

== Notable Russian mafia bosses ==
- Zakhary Kalashov (born 1953): currently widely believed to be one of the most prominent members of the Russian mafia.
- Vyacheslav Ivankov (1940–2009): believed to have connections with Russian state intelligence organizations and their organized crime partners.
- Vladimir Kumarin (born 1956): former deputy president of the Petersburg Fuel Company (PTK) between 1998 and 1999, and the boss of the criminal Tambovskaya Bratva (Tambov gang) of Saint Petersburg.
- Sergei Mikhailov (born 1958): businessman and leader of the Solntsevskaya Bratva criminal syndicate.
- Semion Mogilevich (born 1946): described by agencies in the European Union and United States as the "boss of all bosses" of most Russian Mafia syndicates in the world.
- Aslan Usoyan (1937–2013): according to operational data and media materials, he was the leader of Caucasian criminal groups, in particular, the "Tbilisi" and "Yazidis" clans, as well as one of the most powerful criminal leaders and thieves in law in Russia.
- Tariel Oniani (born 1952): believed to be the leader of the "Kutaisi gang", considered the most influential ethnic Georgian organized crime group in Russia.

== Notable individual groups ==
Groups based in and around the City of Moscow:

- The Orekhovskaya gang: founded by Sergei "Sylvester" Timofeyev, this group reached its height in Moscow in the 1990s. When Timofeyev died, Sergei Butorin took his place. However, he was sentenced to jail for life in 2011.
- Lyuberetskaya Bratva (Russian: Люберецкая ОПГ) or Lyubery (Russian: Люберы): one of the largest criminal groups with around 3,000 members in late 1990s until today. Based in (and originating from) Lyubertsy district of Moscow. Led by Denis Sergin (Fraser) since the 2000s.
- Solntsevskaya Bratva (Russian: Солнцевская ОПГ): led by Sergei "Mikhas" Mikhailov, it is Russia's largest criminal group with about 5,000 members, and is named after the Solntsevo District.
- The Izmaylovskaya gang: one of Russia's oldest modern gangs, it was started in the mid- to late-1980s by Oleg Ivanov; it has around 200–500 members in Moscow alone, and is named after the Izmaylovo District. Izmailovskaya has good relations with the Podolskaya gang. Anton Malevsky was the leader until his death in 2001. The Ismailovskaya mafia is closely associated with Oleg Deripaska, Andrey Bokarev, Michael Cherney, and Iskander Makhmudov through their Switzerland based "Blonde Investment Company" and is closely associated with Oleg Andreevich Kharchenko (Russian: Олег Андреевич Харченко) and Vladimir Putin's SP AG (Russian: Санкт-Петербургское общество недвижимости и долевого участия, lit. 'Saint-Petersburg Agency Group'). Liechtenstein police proved that Rudolf Ritter (brother to Michael Ritter, a Financial Minister) a Liechtenstein-based lawyer, jurist who practiced in offshore businesses (identification evasion), and financial manager for the accounts of both Putin's SPAG and the Ismailovskaya mafia and that Alexander Afanasyev ("Afonya") was connected to both SPAG and the Ismailovskaya mafia through his Panama registered Earl Holding AG. Also, Rudolf Ritter signed for Earl Holding, Berger International Holding, Repas Trading SA and Fox Consulting. The Colombia-based Cali KGB Cartel supplied cocaine to the Ismailovskaya mafia, too. Rudolf Ritter was arrested in May 2020 on money laundering charges.
- The Podolskaya gang: one of the richest with its common fund kept in the United States. Located in the Podolsky, Chekhovsky, and Serpukhovsky districts of the Moscow region and beyond including close relations with mafia in the United States and Belgium. Their focus is oil and extortion. They provided support to Anatoly Bykov.

Groups based in other parts of Russia and the former Soviet Union:

- The Dolgoprudnenskaya gang: Russia's second largest criminal group. Originally from the City of Dolgoprudny
- The Tambov gang of Saint Petersburg is very closely aligned with Nikolai Aulov, who is the head of the Federal Drug Control Service; Alexander Bastrykin, who is the head of the Investigative Committee; Japanese yakuza from Kobe and Osaka; and with the political rise of Vladimir Putin. Putin's long time personal body guard, Victor Zolotov is very close to this group as well. the man most associated with them is Vladimir Kumarin.
- The Komarovskaya organized criminal group (leader - Komar) controls the St. Petersburg-Vyborg highway (A181) called Scandinavia or the Russia part of the European highway E18, which includes everything along the road (hotels, repair garages, cafes and restaurants, etc.) and the transportation process as well as St. Petersburg's trucking businesses. Komarovskaya OPG steal automobiles, commit robberies, provide protection racketeering, and receive strong support from the Usvyatsov-Putyrsky gang and its AOZT "Putus" to organize the supply of cocaine from South America into Russia, Finland, Scandinavia and Europe and the trade in counterfeit dollars.
- The Usvyatsov-Putyrsky gang (AOZT "Putus") led by Vladimir Putyrsky (Vova-One-armed) and Leonid Ionovich Usvyatsov (Lenya-Sportsman) organizes both the supply of cocaine from South America into Russia, Finland, Scandinavia and Europe and the trade in counterfeit dollars and works closely with the Komarovskaya organized criminal group. Both Putyrsky and Usvyatsov have large estates in the Czech Republic where they enjoy hunting. During the 1980s, sambo coach "Trud" Usvyatsov, who was imprisoned for rape, robbery and theft, coached Vladimir Putin, Arkady Rotenberg, Boris Rotenberg and Nikolai Kononov.
- The Uzbek criminals in Litvinenko's Uzbek file, including Michael Cherney, Gafur Rakhimov, Vyacheslav Ivankov, and Salim Abduvaliev (also spelled Salim Abdulaev); are Uzbek origin KGB and later FSB officers at Moscow including Colonel Evgeny Khokholkov; were organized by Vladimir Putin while Putin was Deputy Mayor for Economic Affairs of St Petersburg in the early 1990s; and control Afghanistan origin drug trade through St Petersburg, Russia, and then to Europe. Boris Berezovsky told Litvinenko to brief his Uzbek file about corrupt FSB officers to the future Head of the FSB Putin, which Litvinenko did on 25 July 1998 and, later, Litvinenko was imprisoned. Robert Eringer, head of Monaco's Security Service, confirmed Litvinenko's file about Vladimir Putin as a kingpin in Europe's narcotics trade. The Colombia-based Cali KGB Cartel supplied cocaine to this network, too.
- The Slonovskaya gang was one of the strongest and violent criminal groups in CIS in the 1990s. It was based in Ryazan city. It had a long-term bloody wars with other active criminal groups in the city (Ayrapetovskaya, Kochetkovskie, etc.) with which it initially coexisted peacefully. The gang virtually disappeared by 2000 as its members were getting hunted down and imprisoned by local Russian Police.
- The Uralmash gang of Yekaterinburg.
- The Chechen mafia is one of the largest ethnic organized crime groups operating in the former Soviet Union next to established Russian mafia groups.
- The Georgian mafia is regarded as one of the biggest, powerful and influential criminal networks in Europe, which has produced the biggest number of thieves in law in all former USSR countries.
- The Mkhedrioni was a paramilitary group involved in organised crime led by a thief in law Jaba Ioseliani in Georgia in the 1990s.
- The city of Kazan was known for its gang culture, which later progressed into more organised, mafiaesque groups. This was known as the Kazan phenomenon.

Groups based in other areas:

- The Brothers' Circle: headed by Temuri Mirzoyev, this multi-ethnic transnational group is "composed of leaders and senior members of several Eurasian criminal groups largely based in countries of the former Soviet Union but operating in Europe, the Middle East, Africa, and Latin America". In 2011, US President Barack Obama and his administration named it one of four transnational organized crime groups that posed the greatest threat to US national security, and sanctioned certain key members and froze their assets. A year later, he extended the national emergency against them for another year.
- The Semion Mogilevich organization: based in Budapest, Hungary and headed by the crime boss of the same name, this group numbered approximately 250 members as of 1996. Its business is often connected with that of the Solntsevskaya Bratva and the Vyacheslav Ivankov Organization. Aleksey Anatolyevich Lugovkov is the second-in-command, and Vitaly Borisovich Savalovsky is the "underboss" to Mogilevich.

== See also ==
- Anti-organized crime institutions in Russia
- Corruption in Russia
- Crime in Russia
- List of post-Soviet mobsters
- Mafia state
- Russian oligarch
- Thief in law
- Russian mafia in popular culture
- Russian mafia in Germany
- Russian mafia in Israel

== Sources ==
- "The Russian mafia and its impact on the Russian economy". Archived from the original on 27 December 2013.
- "Russian mafia controls economy and politics uexpress.com Sept 30, 1997".
