= Georgian mafia =

Umbrella term for Georgian organized crime groups

- ქართული მაფია kartuli mapia
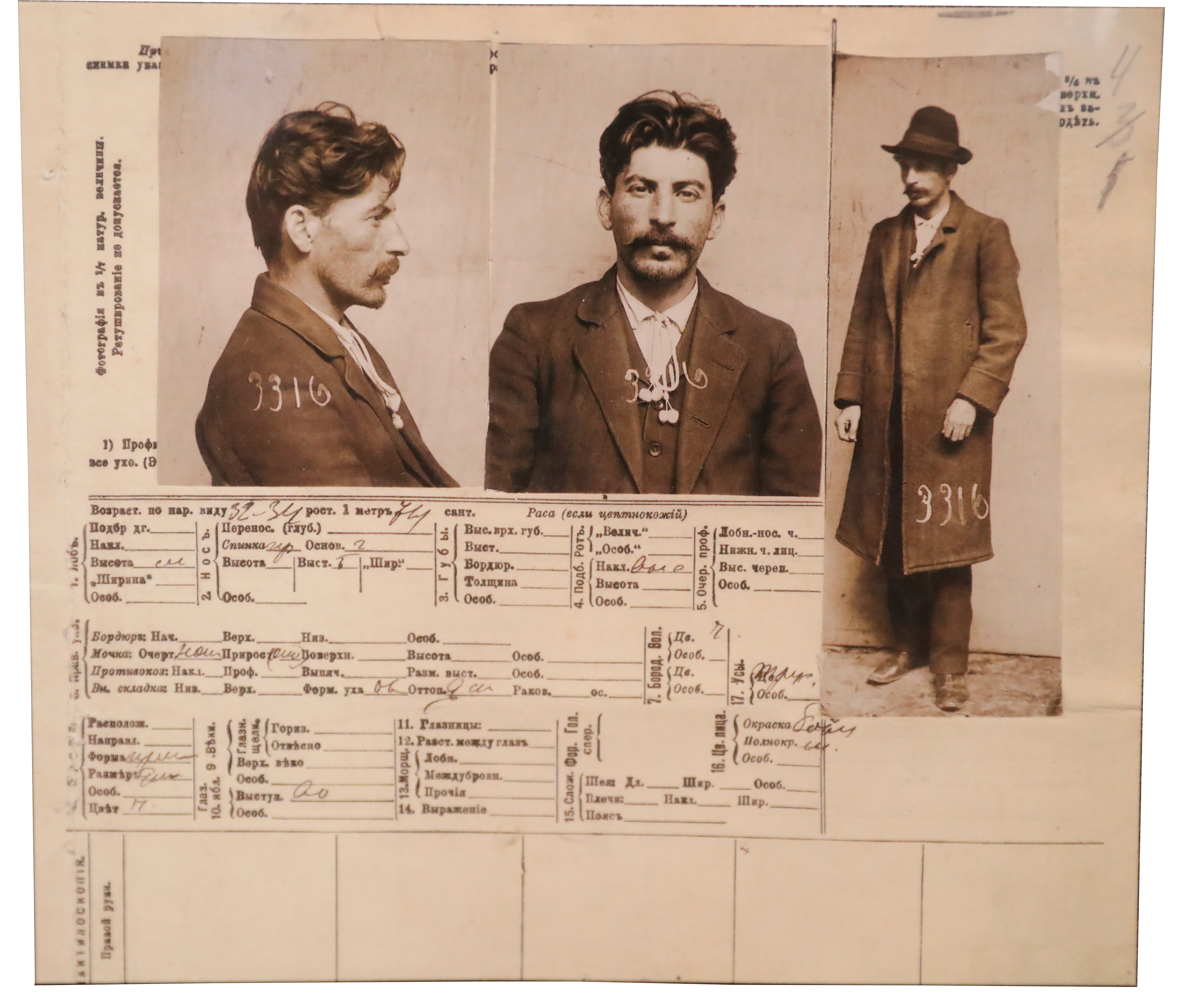
- Mugshot of Joseph Stalin
- Founding location: Georgia
- Territory: Georgia, European Union, Post-Soviet states and Israel.
- Ethnicity: Georgians, Georgian Jews, Yezidis
- Criminal activities: Arms trafficking, assault, bribery, extortion, fraud, human trafficking, illegal gambling, kidnapping, money laundering, murder, racketeering, and theft
- Allies: Russian mafia Israeli mafia
- Notable members: List of members

The Georgian mafia (Georgian: ქართული მაფია, romanized: kartuli mapia) is an organized crime network in Georgia, Israel and Europe, which has produced the largest number of "thieves in law" in all former USSR countries and controls and regulates most of the Russian-speaking and fully controls Russia and Georgia mafia groups.

Georgian criminal groups are very active in Russia and Europe. The Georgian mafia has two major criminal clans from Tbilisi and Kutaisi. Georgia always had a disproportionately high number of crime bosses and still has a majority of the 700 or so still operating in the post-Soviet space and western Georgia (Kutaisi Clan) is particularly well represented.

In many of its rules or "laws", the Georgian mafia parallels the Sicilian Mafia.

== History ==
=== Soviet period ===
Georgia is a small Eurasian state with a population of about four million, of whom two-thirds are Georgians, and the national minorities are mainly Russian, Armenian, and Azerbaijani. The geographical position of the country is due to the strategically advantageous junction of important communications from Europe to Asia.

According to foreign researchers, the Georgian criminal traditions were formed long before the October Revolution. It is thanks to cooperation with the Georgian crime that the young and energetic Joseph Stalin so successfully engaged in robbing banks, extorting money and stealing property from wealthy citizens. In addition to the profit, the revolutionary criminal environment in Georgia contributed to the intimidation of competitors and the holding of high-profile terrorist acts. The rudiments of this system can be seen a century later, as they still permeate the country.

The October Revolution transformed the Georgian underworld just as much as it changed other parts of society. Stalin's ascension to power was accompanied by the corresponding upward movement of representatives of Georgian society. Due to this, the degree of representation of Georgians in the Soviet hierarchy of power was disproportionately high. Interestingly, a similar process was observed in the Soviet criminal underground, where up to a third of strategically important positions were taken by immigrants from Georgia, while the share of the Georgian ethnic group in the general population of the USSR did not exceed 2%.

This trend has often attracted the attention of international scientists. They often pointed out that in Soviet times the Georgian SSR had a very high standard of living due to its well-developed shadow economy, and the Georgian “thieves in law” held key positions in the criminal communities of the entire Soviet Union. Natives of Georgia were engaged in underground production and unrecorded trade throughout the USSR, often siphoning significant resources from the legitimate economy. Georgian farmers earned on the supply of scarce fruits to large Soviet cities a lot of money, and their income could be ten times higher than the average Soviet worker’s earnings. The clan system of the underworld of Soviet Georgia was formed in the 1970s as an association of professional criminals, tsekhoviks and corrupt officials. In those days, when the whole country was huddled in modest small-sized apartments, Georgian officials allowed themselves to build huge apartments for personal use. It is believed that such a lifestyle is associated with an innate culture of ignoring all sorts of rules, which is not so easy to eradicate. As a result, in the 1980s, the allied government had to recognize the existence of organized crime in the country, which served the requests of the ruling elite in exchange for its protection.

Obtaining sovereignty in Georgia is often viewed as a departure of the country from the Soviet methods of economic and political administration, but this view does not reflect reality. At that time, no deep reform of the legislation in Georgia and in other post-Soviet countries was carried out and there was not even an intention to modernize the legal system.

At the dawn of independence of the country, a number of local wars and military conflicts, the course of which largely depended on which side they took a well-organized Georgian criminal groups. After these events, a number of "double flowers", strategically important areas, blossomed previously unknown to local residents of the phenomenon, such as human trafficking, weapons smuggling and illegal drugs. The standard of living in the country has declined much more than in other CIS republics, the system of government has practically ceased to function, and many sectors of the economy (especially the energy sector) were rapidly criminalized. Suddenly it turned out that corruption and organized crime pose a threat to the country no less than Chechen terrorists, who feel at ease in the Pankisi Gorge.

=== Independent Georgia ===
During the period leading up to Georgian independence in 1991, as tension grew between Georgians and ethnic Abkhaz several nationalist militias were formed, the two most prominent being the National Guard of Georgia led by ex-convict Tengiz Kitovani and the Mkhedrioni led by former thief-in-law Jaba Ioseliani. Due to an absence of any other means of funding, the militias engaged in protection rackets and smuggling and the weak Georgian government had no choice but to embrace them.

The paramilitaries were first deployed against the separatist regions of Abkhazia and South Ossetia, but attempts by President Zviad Gamsakhurdia to rein them in resulted in a violent coup where he was replaced by Eduard Shevardnadze, who had the backing of the militias, which continued to operate with impunity. The Mkhedrioni took advantage of their position of power to take over the gasoline business. Shevardnadze finally got the excuse he needed to disband the militias in 1995 after an assassination attempt. Ioseliani was imprisoned, although released in 2000 as part of a general amnesty, dying three years later. But other, less idealistic thieves-in-law still continued to dominate day-to-day life in Georgia.

According to Spanish prosecutor Jose Grinda, Georgian mafia led by Dzhaba Iosselani during the 1990s took control of the country and state and then later led by Zakhariy Kalashov during Shevardnadze's rule. (Note: Since April 2006, Khachidze or Lasha Shushanashvilialso imparted influence on Georgia as well as Tariel Oniani from Kutaisi near South Abkhazia.)

In the 1990s, the Georgian political elite began to cooperate with organized crime. The state was mired in corruption and bribery began to flourish almost everywhere. One of the famous members of the Georgian government, Kakha Targamadze, the Minister of Internal Affairs, was connected with such criminal authorities as Aslan Usoyan, Tariel Oniani and Dzambo Dzambidze. After that, the smuggling activities of Dzambo Dzambidze and Tariel Oniani became safer and more profitable. Kakha Targamadze also took over all types of illegal income that were extracted from the budget of the Ministry of Internal Affairs. Already in the late 1990s, Kakha Targamadze turned a blind eye to the fact that members of the organized crime group of Dzambo Dzambidze (Aslan Usoyan's supporter) and Tariel Oniani (Aslan Usoyan's opponent) liquidated police officers and border guards who were inconvenient to them and openly engaged in and competed in extortion, racketeering, and kidnappings. For example, Dzambo Dzambidze's people killed Major Khvicha Abashvili in his home, along with his entire family, shot police officer Jabrail Karskhia and police officer Avtandil Tumanishvili, Tariel Oniani's people killed his minor criminal opponents, etc.

=== Rose Revolution ===
In November 2003 a popular uprising known as the Rose Revolution toppled the Shevardnadze's government and put Mikheil Saakashvili's regime in power. Saakashvili soon implemented a series of reforms aimed at tackling crime and corruption, firing and imprisoning a number of officials as well as making membership of the thieves-in-law a crime in 2005. In response to this as well as harsher prison regimes, several prison riots broke out before being heavy-handedly put down. In order to avoid prosecution, Georgian gangsters fled the country, typically to Russia, Israel and Western Europe.

== International activity ==
=== In Russia ===
Georgian organized crime has been present in Russia since the Soviet era. During the 1990s, as rival criminal gangs, corrupt law enforcement and oligarchs fought one another for supremacy over the lucrative protection rackets of the emerging private business sector in the chaotic transition to capitalism, the Georgian mafia made its presence known in Moscow. One of the most famous bosses of this period was Otari Kvantrishvili, a former sportsman turned racketeer after a conviction for rape. He would often act as a go-between for various underworld factions and something of a public face for the mafia. Prior to his assassination in 1993, Kvantrishvili spoke of his ambitions to start his own political party. His funeral was attended by many celebrities and politicians, including the singer Joseph Kobzon.

In more recent years, the Georgian underworld in Russia, Georgia and elsewhere has been characterized by a violent feud between the Kutaisi and Tbilisi clans, led by Tariel Oniani and Aslan Usoyan, respectively. The conflict claimed the life of notorious Russian thief-in-law Vyacheslav Ivankov, who was assassinated while attempting to mediate in 2009, while Usoyan was himself killed by a sniper in January 2013.

=== In Spain ===
The Georgian mafia operates in Spain through criminal groups involved mainly in violent crimes and organized property offenses, including internal score-settling killings and coordinated burglaries in residential properties. Spanish law enforcement agencies such as the Mossos d'Esquadra, the National Police, and the Civil Guard have carried out multiple operations against these groups, resulting in dozens of arrests in cities such as Barcelona and Madrid. These groups have been linked to large-scale home burglaries targeting jewelry and gold watches, which were later pawned through cooperating buy-and-sell businesses that were also inspected during investigations. Major police operations in Spain revealed an organized and hierarchical structure, with members residing in Spanish cities and coordinating criminal activities across different regions of the country.

=== In Italy ===
The activities of the Georgian mafia in Italy are concentrated mainly in the city of Bari, where the organization has been involved in a range of illegal operations including apartment burglaries, money laundering, and the trafficking of weapons and uranium. One of the most well-known and feared leaders of the Georgian mafia and thief in law, Merab Dzhangveladze, known as Jango, is said to live in a luxurious area of Bari but completely hidden, reflecting the underground nature of the group’s current operations. According to reports, Bari has become a central base for the Georgian crime groups due to the size and structure of the local Georgian community and because the city functions as a strategic logistical hub, particularly for connections toward Greece and Turkey along routes leading to the Caucasus area.

== Notable members ==
- Tariel Oniani (ტარიელ ონიანი), born in 1952: A ‘thief in law’ and one of the leaders of the Kutaisi crime clan. He has played a significant role in the Russian criminal underworld and is regarded as one of its most influential figures.
- Aslan Usoyan (ასლან უსოიანი), 1937–2013: Considered for a time Moscow’s most powerful crime figure, his criminal clan controlled the gambling business, owned several prestigious casinos in Russia and Europe, oversaw the banking sector, timber and metal exports, and the oil business, and was involved in arms and drug smuggling.
- Lasha Shushanashvili (ლაშა შუშანაშვილი), born in 1964: Influential crime boss and “thief in law” who led criminal activities across Georgia, Russia, Ukraine, and Western Europe.
- Merab Dzhangveladze (მერაბ ჯანგველაძე), born in 1961: A thief in law, who received this title at age 24. He became an influential figure in disputes between Georgian crime clans. Dzhangveladze is particularly active in Italy.
- Otari Kvantrishvili (ოთარ კვანტრიშვილი), 1948–1994: Was the leader of the Tbilisi crime clan active in Moscow, who rapidly gained significant authority and influence in Russia during the early 1990s. He maintained close relations with government officials and was regarded as an almost all-powerful figure. In 1994 he was assassinated by a sniper in Moscow, an act described as having been carried out on the orders of Russian special services.
- Zakhariy Kalashov (ზახარი კალაშოვი), born in 1953: A prominent criminal authority in the Russian underworld, he is recognized as a “thief in law №1.” Kalashov led his own criminal group, controlled gambling and drug businesses in Russia, and ran casinos in Tbilisi. He was involved in money laundering and organized criminal operations internationally, including Spain, where he was arrested and sentenced to 7.5 years in prison. After serving part of his sentence, he returned to Moscow.
- Gia Kvaratskhelia (გია კვარაცხელია), born in 1963: Active in the criminal underworld of Georgia since his youth, his crime clan is active also in Russia, Ukraine, Italy, and Spain.

== In popular culture ==
- In the 1988 film Red Heat, Arnold Schwarzenegger portrays a Moscow cop sent to Chicago to bring back a Georgian drug lord Viktor Rostavili / Viktor Rosta.
- In the 1995 film GoldenEye, crime syndicate member Xenia Onatopp.
- The video game Grand Theft Auto: The Ballad of Gay Tony features fictional crime boss Marki Ashvili.
- The video game Deus Ex: Mankind Divided features the fictional Georgian Dvali crime family.
- In Agents of S.H.I.E.L.D. season 1 episode "The Hub", the main antagonist of this episode, Marta (played by Alison Whyte) is a mob boss in the region near the Caucasus Mountains with enough level of influence to help people to cross the South Ossetian borders.
- In Tyler Rake - Extraction 2 Tyler Rake retires from mercenary work to a cabin in Austria to recuperate. There, he is approached by a stranger and asked to rescue Ketevan, the sister of his ex-wife Mia, and her two children, Sandro and Nina, from Georgia. Ketevan married Davit Radiani, one of the co-founders of the Nagazi, a crime syndicate in Georgia.

== See also ==
- Chechen mafia
- Azerbaijani mafia
- Armenian mafia
