= Otari Kvantrishvili =

Georgian mafia boss (1948–1994)

- Born: January 27, 1948; Zestaponi, Imereti, Georgian SSR, Soviet Union
- Died: April 5, 1994 (aged 46); Moscow, Russia
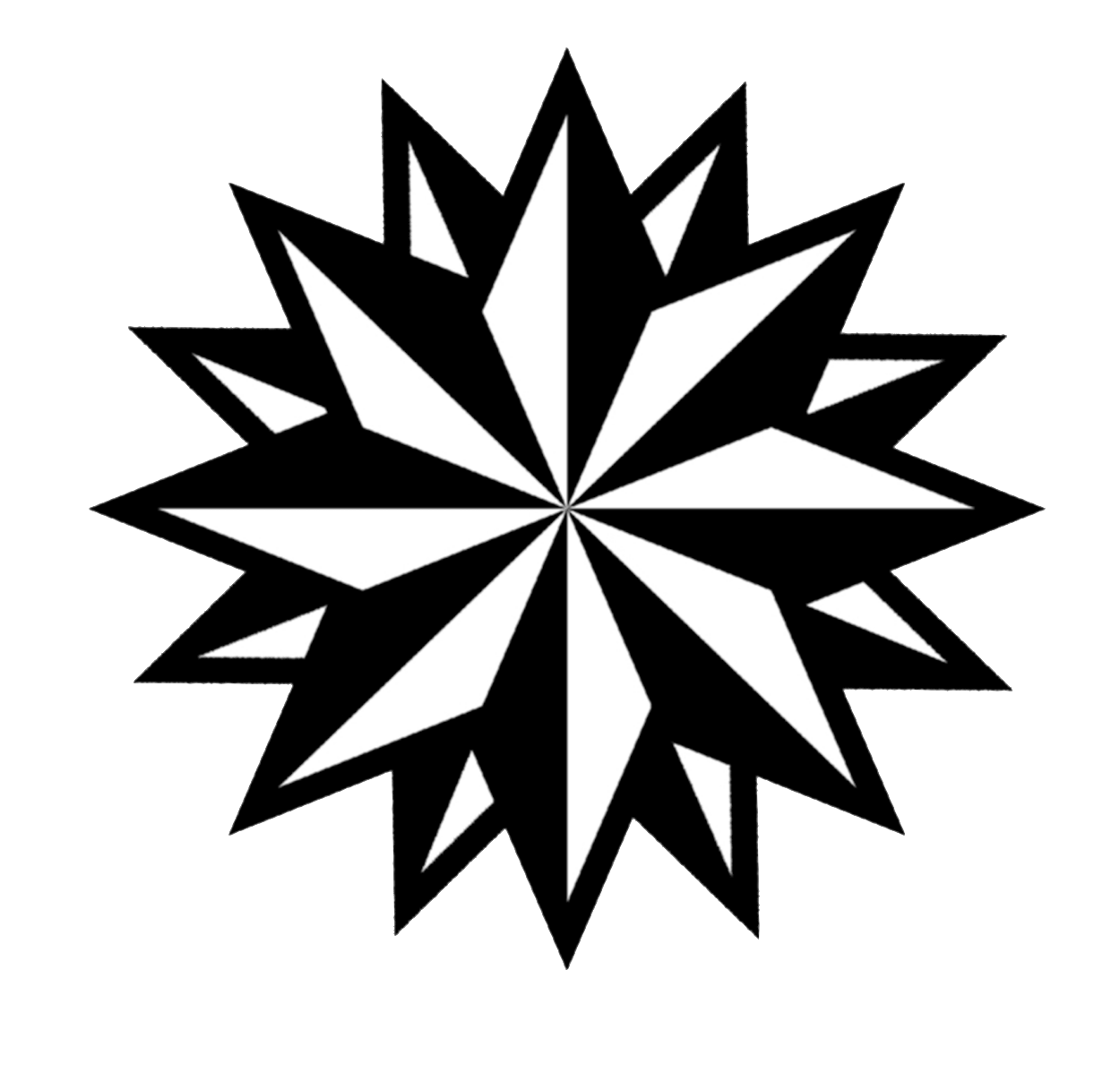
- Status
- Criminal charges: Extortion, Mafia boss
- Accomplice: Aslan Usoyan

Otari Kvantrishvili (Georgian: ოთარ კვანტრიშვილი, Russian: Отари Квантришвили; January 27, 1948 – April 5, 1994) was a Georgian mafia boss and one of Moscow's leading organised crime figures during the early 1990s.

== Biography ==
Prior to his 1966 conviction for rape, Kvantrishvili was on his way to becoming a world-champion wrestler. In the 1980s he then founded the Dynamo Sports Club and later the 21st Century Association, an organisation ostensibly dedicated to funding sports but was widely regarded as a front for racketeering. During the chaotic transition to capitalism in the early 1990s, Kvantrishvili became something of a public face for the mafia, befriending politicians and celebrities such as Joseph Kobzon while also acting as a mediator between various underworld factions, including the thieves in law and Slavic and Chechen mobsters.

The Podolskaya OPG (Russian: Подольская организованная преступная группировка (ОПГ)) were close to Kvantrishvili.

In late 1993, Kvantrishvili publicly announced his intention to enter politics through a new party, the Party of Sportsmen, at a conference attended by many well-known athletes.

At 5:45 pm on 5 April 1994, he was shot dead by a sniper while leaving a Krasnopresnensky bathhouse in Moscow. He was buried at Vagankovskoye.

At the time of his death, Kvantrishvili was actively removing the Cherny brothers from the aluminium industry in Russia who controlled 75% of the aluminum exported from Russia to the West.

Kvantrishvili was in open conflict with Moscow City Police General Vladimir Rushailo (Russian: Вадим Рушайло) in the Moscow RUOP.

On September 29, 2008, four members of the Orekhovo-Medvedkovo gang were convicted, among other things, for organizing Kvantrishvili's murder. Oleg Pylev was sentenced to life in prison, Aleksei Sherstobitov received 23 years of imprisonment, Pavel Makarov – 13 years and Sergei Yelizarov – 11 years. Sherstobitov was the one who actually killed Kvantrishvili. He received a Lada car as payment for Kvantrishvili's murder.
