= Orekhovskaya gang =

Orekhovskaya Organized Crime Group
- Founding location: Moscow, Soviet Union
- Years active: 1988–2000s
- Territory: Moscow, Moscow Oblast
- Membership (est.): 300 - 400 members
- Activities: Extortion, Racket, Protection racket, Money laundering, Murder
- Allies: Solntsevskaya Bratva
- Rivals: Kuntsevskaya gang, Caucasian gangs, Izmailovskaya gang

The Orekhovskaya Organized Crime Group (Russian: Ореховская организованная преступная группировка) was a powerful criminal organization based in Moscow active between the late 1980s and early 2000s.

== History ==
The gang was founded in 1988 and was made up primarily of former young sportsmen between 18 and 25. The gang's leader was Sergey Timofeev, nicknamed "Sylvester" after Sylvester Stallone for his muscular build. Todorov established contacts with other prominent underworld figures such as Vyacheslav Ivankov and Sergei Mikhailov.

In 1989 the gang merged with the Solntsevskaya bratva to combat the growing threat of Chechen mafia gangs. However, by 1997 the alliance had split and Todorov was again running an independent gang.

On September 13, 1994, the gang split into around a dozen separate groups, who later were absorbed into by the Solntsevskaya Bratva.

In 2005 eleven former gang members were sentenced to up to 53 years for their involvement in 264 murders, including that of hitman Alexander Solonik.

== See also ==
- Russian mafia
- Izmaylovskaya gang
- Solntsevskaya Bratva
