= Nadir Salifov =

Georgian-Azerbaijani mobster (1972–2020)

Nadir Salifov Nadir Səlifov
- Born: Nadir Nariman oglu Salifov; August 28, 1972; Dmanisi, Georgian SSR, Soviet Union (now Dmanisi, Georgia)
- Died: 19 August 2020 (aged 47); Antalya, Turkey
- Other name: Guli
- Citizenship: Georgia (former); Azerbaijan (former)
- Occupation: Thief in law
- Parent: Nariman Salifov
- Relatives: Namik Salifov (brother)
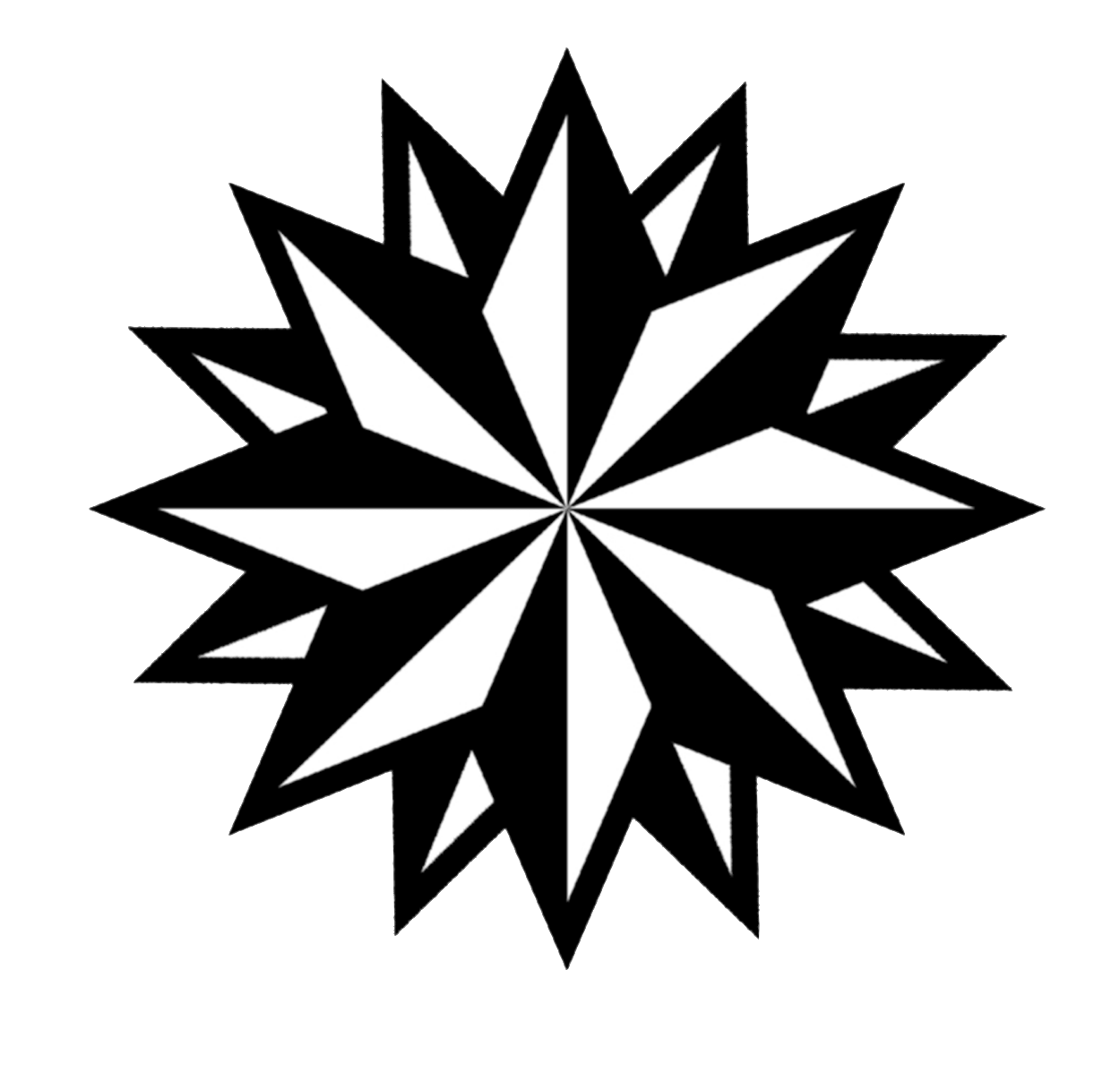
- Status

Nadir Nariman oglu Salifov (Azerbaijani: Nadir Nəriman oğlu Səlifov; 28 August 1972 – 19 August 2020), also known as Lotu Guli (Georgian: გული, lit. 'Heart'), was a major Azerbaijani Gangster and convicted criminal, believed to have been one of the richest Thieves in law.

== Early life ==
Salifov was born in Dmanisi, Georgian SSR to an Azerbaijani family. Since Salifov's family was poor, he began stealing at about 15 years old, eventually doing this in groups, he went on to be trained by a retired thief in law, after gaining some notoriety. Two of Salifov's brothers also joined, with his brother Namik being first to receive a criminal "title."

== Criminal career ==
=== Early activities and arrest ===
Little is known about the beginnings of his criminal career, his first documented run-in with the law was in 1995, where he was arrested in Baku, Azerbaijan on charges of gun possession, to which Salifov claimed innocence.

By law, Azerbaijani authorities can hold a suspect for up to 72 hours, though Salifov was detained for eight months. He claimed to have been held under barbaric conditions: starvation, little water, no facilities for washing, shaving or trimming his nails and no medical care. This resulted in his weight dropping from 210 lb (95 kg) to a mere 138 lb (63 kg).

=== First conviction ===
On 19 July 1996, at age 24, he was convicted of the murder of two rival gang members, despite his protestations of innocence. At the time of his arrest, he was in possession of a Stechkin APS machine pistol, a weapon that at that time only the head of the Azerbaijani Ministry of Internal Affairs, the MVD, was thought to possess. Salifov was given the death penalty, but the presiding judge commuted the sentence to 15 years' imprisonment. Ten of those 15 years were spent in solitary confinement.

=== Legal complications ===
At the time of his arrest, he was carrying a passport of the former USSR issued in Georgia. Salifov did not apply for Azerbaijani citizenship during the years he spent in prison, and remained stateless.

While in prison Salifov also had an additional 16 years added to his original 15-year sentence, as a result of assault charges filed by a female visitor. She however later withdrew her story, and claimed to have made the original allegations under threats from rival gangs. During this, Salifov was also informed that the time he spent during his 10 years in solitary, would not count as part of his served term.

=== Activities from prison ===
While incarcerated, he used the contacts he made there to grow various profitable criminal enterprises. He possessed a cell phone from which he kept contact with criminal associates, who had been released and were at large to do his bidding. One of his major means of growth at the time were various extortion rackets he ran on various Azerbaijani businesses.

Salifov was also believed to have arranged for at least eight women to be taken in to the prison for illegal conjugal visits, mostly with the assistance of his brother Namik and by bribing prison authorities. He also made similar arrangements for certain fellow prisoners. Some of the women subsequently made allegations of rape and coercion, but these never reached court.

In 2010, while still in prison, there was a turf war known as The Dill War between associates of Nadir Salifov and those of Rovshan Janiyev (known as Rovshan Lenkeransky) over acquiring the greengrocer markets in Moscow and its ring roads, which had previously been operated by convicted criminal Bakic Aliyev. Four men with criminal histories were killed during this conflict. In 2014 there was more struggling for lucrative markets, which led to a "Wild Western-style" gunfight during a meeting of the competing clans in the Absheron cafe of Moscow, in which one man was killed and several suffering gunshot wounds.

=== Activities out of prison ===
During the time of his release, Salifov controlled criminal networks from Russia all the way to the Czech Republic and Poland, and had acquaintances among representatives of the policeforce in the European Union.

In 2017, Salifov was marked as a potential successor to Rovshan Lenkeransky, who was murdered the previous year. This was eventually confirmed by reports of that year, that Janiyev's underboss Agayar Agayev (aka Sedoy, Russian for "grey-haired"), who used to control the Yekaterinburg market, was now representing Salifov's interests. This appeared to be the case despite the fact that there was no love lost between Salifov and Lenkeransky.

In December 2017 Russian police were attempting to defuse a tense situation in which the chechen mafia under Aziz Batukaev had been trying to take control of the greengrocer markets held by Salifov's group. Nadir Salifov had laid claims to the Food City market in Moscow, controlled by Rovshan Lenkoransky's proxies. According to police, the war for the largest wholesale food market in the capital was just starting.

In March 2018, an Azeri claiming to be an exiled journalist called Rahim Namazov, was ambushed in the suburbs of Toulouse, France. Namazov was seriously wounded in the attack, and his wife died of her injuries. Unsubstantiated claims suggested that this attack may have been ordered by Salifov as payback for previous insults and offenses.

In early 2020, a group of four of Salifov's gang members were arrested in Odessa by the Security Service of Ukraine, for running a kidnapping racket. The gang would reach out to their victims or their victim's friends on social media, using women or drugs as bait, and would kidnap their victims and rob their residences. The gang usually demanded a ransom of one million dollars for the release of their hostages, as most of their victims were wealthy businessmen and oligarchs. The gang threatened physical violence for non-payment of the ransom.

== Death ==
Salifov was shot dead on 19 August 2020 at a restaurant in Antalya by his bodyguard, nicknamed "Khan". Khan, who was later identified as 25-year-old Khagan Zeynalov, entered Salifov's room and shot him with a pistol twice; the fatal bullet hit the back of Salifov's head. Salifov was rushed to hospital by his other bodyguards, but he died of injuries in the ambulance. He may have been killed as "revenge for assaulting other Azeri gangsters".

=== Aftermath ===
Zeynalov attempted to escape towards the city of Denizli, but was arrested by Turkish police along with his accomplice Amir Gamidli, who acted as Zeynalov's getaway driver. Zeynalov and Gamidli were sentenced to life imprisonment in Turkey. Salifov's brother Namik ended up succeeding him in his role.
