= Bitch Wars =

1945–53 prison gang murders in the gulag system

The Bitch Wars, or Suka Wars (SOO-kah; /ˈsuːkɑː/; Russian: сучьи войны, romanized: suchyi voyny or in singular: Russian: сучья война, romanized: suchya voyna), were armed confrontations that occurred in the Soviet Gulag labor-camp system between 1945 and 1953. The battles took place between groups of prisoners who agreed to collaborate with administration of labor camps and prisons ("Bitches") and "honest" criminals who followed a "thief's code" that prohibited any collaboration with the prison authorities. In this conflict rival sides were often identified by the system of tattoos common in Soviet prisons at the time.

== Background ==
The Russian word suka (Russian: сука, literally "bitch") has a different negative connotation than its English equivalent. In Russian criminal argot, it specifically refers to a person from the criminal world who has "made oneself a bitch" (Russian: ссучился, romanized: ssuchilsya) by cooperating in any way with law enforcement or with the government. Within the Soviet prison system, a social structure had existed since the Imperial era; one of its most important tenets decreed that members not serve or collaborate with the Tsarist (and later, Soviet) government. This rule encompassed all types of collaboration and not just "snitching" or "ratting out". It included simple communication, seeking emergency help from any authority figures, even factory foremen.

== Second World War ==
As the Second World War progressed, Joseph Stalin offered many prisoners a pardon or sentence reduction at war's end in exchange for military service. After the war ended, many of those who had taken up the offer returned to prisons and labor camps, but were declared suki and placed at the lower end of the unofficial prisoner hierarchy. As a result, they sought to survive by collaborating with prison officials, in return getting some of the better jobs in the prison.

This led to an internal prison war between the so-called suki and the Russian criminal underground led by "Thieves in Law". Many prisoners died in the Bitch War, but prison authorities turned a blind eye.

By the end of the 1940s, a large influx in suki with previous combat experience began to weaken the dominance of the thieves in law, who found them to be more willing and able to fight back attempts to rob them than the intellectuals and political prisoners they had dealt with before. Large battles broke out between the suki and the thieves in law, with prison authorities sometimes arming the suki to break the hierarchy of the thieves in law. By the early 1950s, the suki had generally won the Bitch Wars, leading to a shift in Russian prison culture towards the tolerance of cooperation with prison authorities.

== See also ==
- Gulag
- Prison gang
- Russian mafia
- Soviet Union in World War II
