= Armenian mafia =

Umbrella term for Armenian organized crime groups

- Founding location: Armenia
- Territory: Armenia, Russia and post-Soviet states, United States, Australia
- Ethnicity: Armenian
- Criminal activities: Extortion, racketeering, assault, contract killing, money laundering, bribery, embezzlement, tax evasion, drug trafficking
- Allies: Cosa Nostra (US); Mexican Mafia; Russian mafia Iranian mafia Lebanese mafia Cosa Nostra; Camorra; Greek mafia Kurdish mafia Ndrangheta
- Rivals: Azerbaijani mafia Turkish mafia Pakistani mafia

The Armenian mafia (Armenian: Հայկական մաֆիա, romanized: Haykakan mafia) is a general term for organized criminal gangs that consist of ethnic Armenians. In Armenia, the structure is organized in clans called yekhpayrutyuns (եղբայրություններ, brotherhoods).

== International activity ==
=== Germany ===
In 2009 and 2011, the German Federal Criminal Police Office (BKA) launched an investigation into these criminal groups. On July 13, 2014, two men were injured when two groups got into an argument in which shots were fired in Erfurt. MDR Thüringen reported that after several months of investigations, the BKA arrested 31-year-old car dealer Arthur Z. and 26-year-old Karo S. on suspicion of drug trafficking, as during the raids, police discovered 35 kilograms of marijuana.

A BKA report concluded that Armenian organized crime groups exist in Germany and possess considerable financial resources together with other criminal groups from the former Soviet Union.

Armenian criminal groups in Germany were particularly involved in drug trafficking, counterfeiting, gambling, and the organization of illegal migration.

=== France ===
French Gendarmerie with on-the-field support of Europol targeted suspects across France believed to be part of an Armenian mafia group involved in large-scale poly-criminal activities, including cigarette smuggling, extortion and money laundering. Over 27 house searches were carried out in Rennes, Gap, St. Etienne, Nancy, Strasbourg, Haguenau, Reims, Chalon-Sur-Saône, Paris, Nantes, Limoges and Brest. As a result, 21 suspects were arrested, including an individual believed to be a high-ranking member of this mafia group. Some €23 000 in cash was seized at the premises, alongside over 2 000 packs of cigarettes, 23 kg of raw tobacco and 6 weapons.

In December 2018, the French police conducted an operation codenamed VORS 69-01 against a criminal syndicate operating in France and Belgium, which included Azerbaijani mafiosi, Georgian mafiosi and Armenian gangsters. The syndicate was involved in burglaries, drug trafficking, and document forgery. More than 300 police officers and aircraft were involved in the operation.

=== Spain ===
Spain's Civil Guard arrested 15 people in an investigation into tennis match-fixing. Europol released information that 11 house searches had been carried out in Spain in which 167,000 euros (£151,000) in cash were seized, along with a shotgun. It added that more than 50 electronic devices, credit cards, five luxury vehicles and documentation related to the case were also seized. Forty-two bank accounts have also been frozen. Europol said in a statement that "A criminal group of Armenian individuals used a professional tennis player, who acted as the link between the gang and the rest of the criminal group". Spain's Civil Guard added that "once they got the bribe, the Armenian members went to the places where the matches were being played to make sure the player went through with what they had agreed, making the most of their imposing size".

In 2018, National Police of Spain arrested 129 people from a Thief in law Armenian criminal organization, and carried out 74 house searches. Among the criminals arrested were 7 Thieves in Law, who were involved into drug trafficking, arms trade, tobacco smuggling, money laundering, corruption in sports bookmaking, and other property crimes committed throughout Europe. The suspects have close ties with tennis, beach volleyball, basketball, and hockey players who were bribed in at least 20 sport matches. The organization also had strong ties with other criminals who live along Europe, and used several dummy companies for their money laundering purposes. According to Pedro Felicio, Chief of EUROPOL´s Economic and Property Crime, that would be "one of the biggest police hits ever to this kind of criminal organizations"

=== United States ===
In September 1995, members of the Armenian mafia were arrested by the FBI in North Hollywood accused of racketeering, extortion and other scams.
