= Dzambo Dzambidze =

Georgian mafia boss

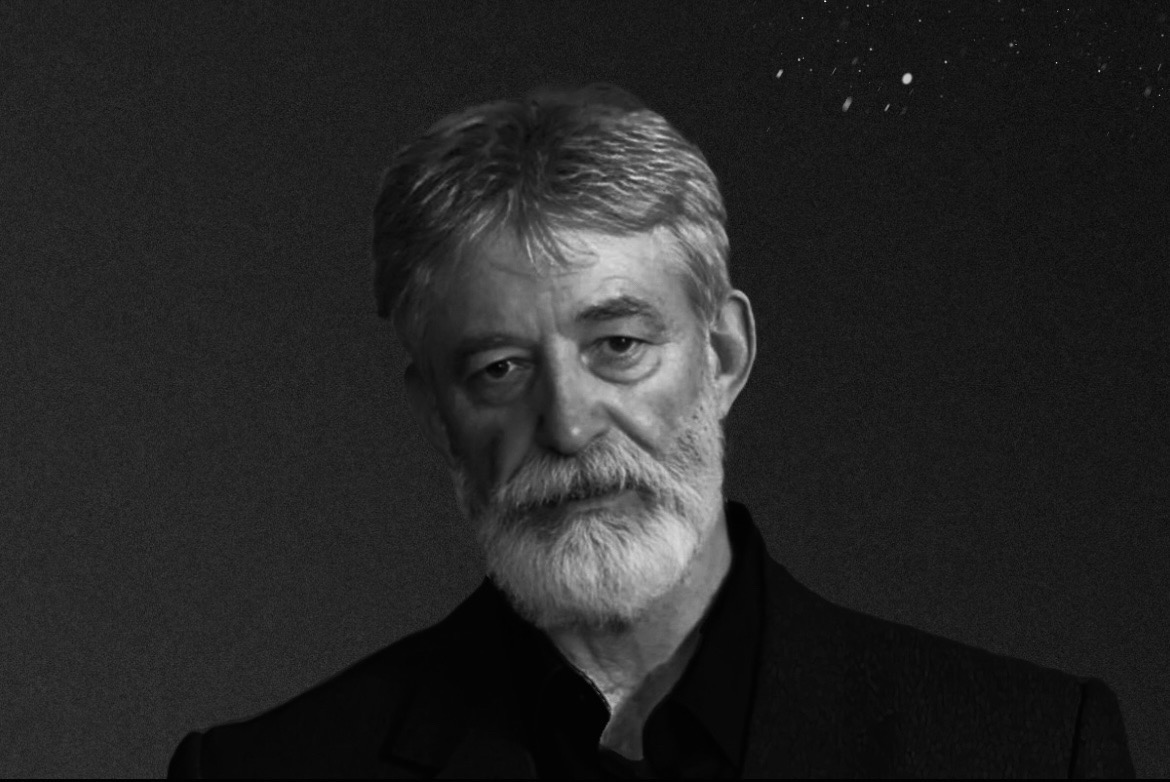
- Dzambidze in 1998
- Born: June 29, 1947 (age 79); Rustavi, Georgia
- Other name: Dzhambo Molodoi (Young Jumbo)
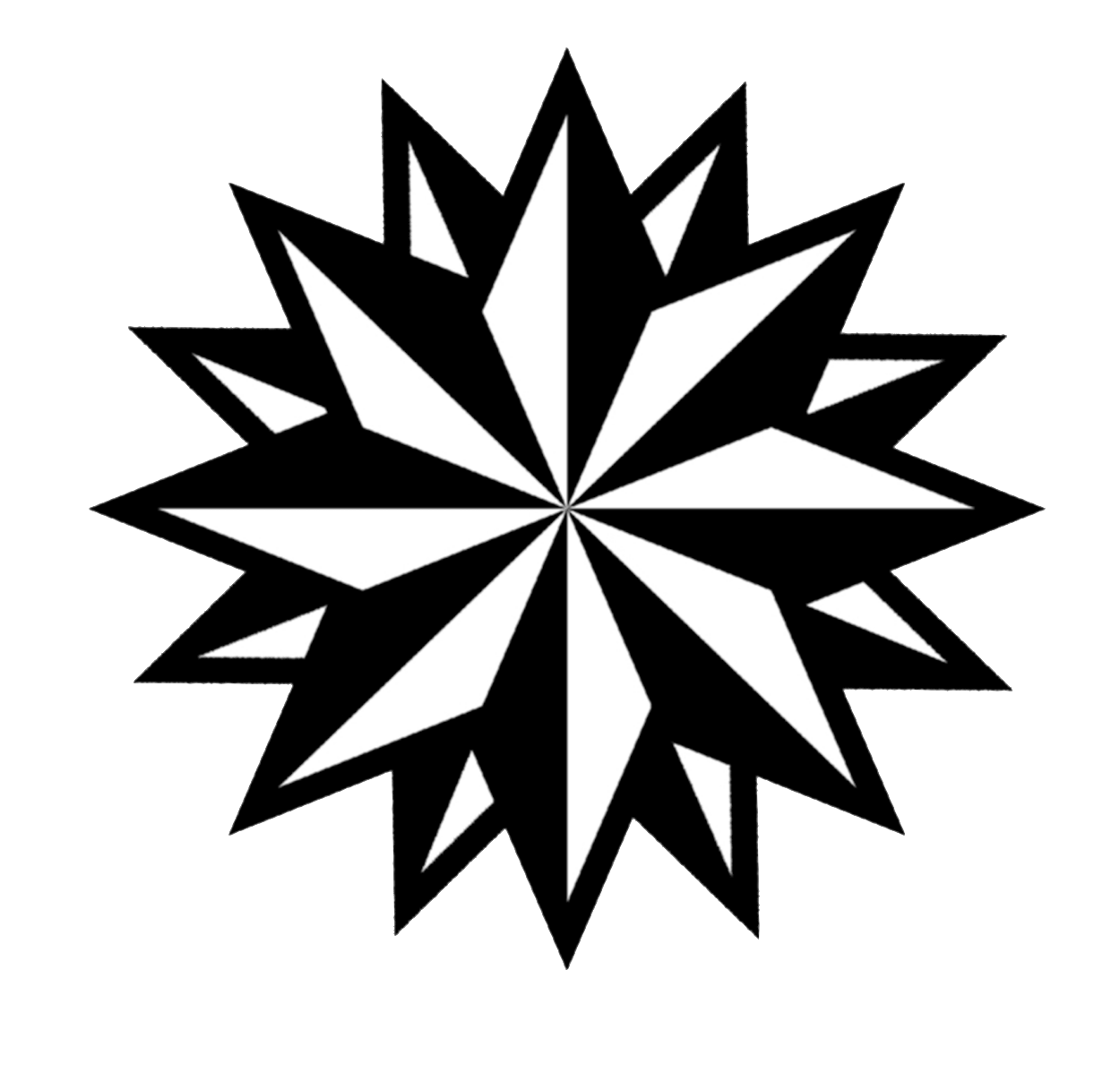
- Status
- Criminal charges: Extortion, Mafia boss
- Accomplice: Aslan Usoyan

Dzambo Dzambidze (Georgian: ძამბო დათოს ძე ძამბიძე; Iron Ossetic: Дзамбидзе Датойы фырт Дзамбо; born June 29, 1947), nicknamed "Young Jumbo", is a Georgian mafia boss and "thief in law". He is a member of the Rustavi and Tbilisi criminal gangs.

== Biography ==
Dzambo Dzambidze was born in Rustavi, Georgian SSR. He was born into a Georgian-Ossetian family. From the age of 19, he was engaged in criminal activity. In 1969, Jumbo was sentenced by the district court to 5 years of imprisonment for robbery. In 1977, Dzambidze was again sent to Tulun prison for fraud, and there he was crowned to the rank of thief in law.

After his release in 1982, Dzambo Dzambidze began extortion. In the late 1980s, when criminals began racketeering, Jumbo created his Rustavi criminal group, which included young guys who had been to prison at most once. This organization also included Gurgen (Gabriel Gabinidze) and Varzo (Varzo Varziev), who had been to prison several times.

In the 1990s, Young Jumbo was the leader of the Rustavi and Tbilisi organized crime groups together with Lasha Rustavsky. The Rustavi organized crime group was involved in smuggling alcohol from factories in Ossetia via the Georgian Military Road. In 1990, Dzambo Dzambidze founded an insurance company "Nateli Gza LLC" that insured property, as well as engaged in the cooperative construction of apartment buildings. Huge profits from smuggling were laundered through this company. The "Nateli Gza LLC" offered itself as a reliable developer. Under the pretext of "financial difficulties", the deadlines for the delivery of houses were constantly postponed, and the shareholders' money disappeared. In some cases, Jumbo sold the same housing to several people at once, taking advantage of the chaos in land registers. People who tried to complain were faced with harsh methods. In 1994, Irakli Kotashvili, one of the shareholders who tried to organize a class action against the company, went missing. His body was found in the Kura River with signs of torture. Since 1993, the company stopped building houses for cooperative money, the company simply collected money from people and left the construction of houses at the foundation stage.

In the mid-1990s, Dzambo Dzambidze supported Aslan Usoyan in the struggle for influence. His group also became one of Aslan Usoyan's clans and was in conflict with the rival Kutaisi organized crime group, led by Tariel Oniani. At the same time, the Rustavi organized crime group became part of the Tbilisi organized crime group, which was Aslan Usoyan's main force in the Caucasus. At that time, shootouts began between members of the Tbilisi and Kutaisi groups and a struggle for profitable points and markets. Members of the Tbilisi organized crime group operated in Moscow, while members of the Rustavi organized crime group operated in Georgia. In 1995, Jumbo organized the murder of David "Pedro" Gondia, the owner of a construction company that was a competitor of Dzambo Dzambibze's company. Gondia was also linked to crime and refused to pay "tribute" for his work in Tbilisi. Pedro was under the protection of the Mengrelian criminal group and gave them a portion of his profits. After receiving threats from Jumbo, he asked the group for protection. Gondia was shot dead by a man from a jeep, which was accompanied by two more cars, in the city center in front of dozens of witnesses. The suspect in the execution of the murder was Datiko Tomanidze (the killer, one of the Young Jumbo gang), but soon all suspicions were lifted. The police, who were actually under the control of criminal structures, did not take serious action. A year after the murder of David Gondia, on August 11, 1996, the leader of the Mengrelian group that protected him, Shakro ″Old Shakro″ Kakachia, was killed.

At that time, Dzambo Dzambidze's group was smuggling alcohol from North Ossetia to Georgia and Ukraine, and bribing border guards and police. Varzo Varziev (member of a group from Ossetia) monitored the production of alcohol in Ossetia and its delivery to Georgia. Delivery to Georgia took place via the Georgian Military Road, which was under the control of Baget Ufimsky (Artem Barsukov), he was responsible for the safe and sound delivery of the cargo to Tbilisi, where the alcohol was sold. Due to the huge income from smuggling, Datiko Tomanidze, bodyguard and personal driver of Dzambo Dzambidze, had a Mercedes S73 Brabus (1 of 120 that were in the world). Dzambo Dzambidze drove a Mercedes S600 Long accompanied by 5 cars. Among the border guards who were not bribed and were killed for it were Zaurbek Dzhugashvili, Andrei Berdovsky, Datiko Buradze and others. Many small businessmen who refused to pay tribute to the Rustavi crime group and Aslan Usoyan were also killed. Among the most brutal murders was the shooting of police major Khvicha Abashvili and his family.

Since 1998, Dzambidze has also been involved in human trafficking. After the end of the First Chechen War, human trafficking began to flourish there, particularly involving enslaved foreign journalists and kidnapped Russian citizens. Dzambidze began collaborating with Chechens and soon became one of the bosses of the local human trafficking market. Dzambidze's enslaved people worked in his vineyards on the border with Chechnya, and also worked in the distribution warehouse where contraband was distributed and loaded, which crossed the Georgian-Russian border. Aslan Usoyan (Dzambidze's boss) did not approve of what Jumbo was doing, but he soon turned a blind eye to it, since Dzambidze was his very influential supporter.

In the early 2000s, the situation began to change, because Mikhail Saakashvili's rise to power marked the beginning of a large-scale anti-corruption campaign. In 2004, at another meeting in Tbilisi, Jumbo Molodoi, Artem Barsukov, Varzo Varziev, Gurgen Digorsky, Lasha Rustavsky and other members of the Rustavi and Tbilisi organized crime group were detained by police officers during a Georgian police operation aimed at catching thieves in law and criminal authorities. While trying to save Jumbo from arrest, his bodyguard Datiko Tomanidze (Dato Tskhinvalsky) was shot dead. During the search of Dzambidze's homes, his company's office and his warehouses, $20 million in cash, $400,000 in jewelry, $800,000 in gold, $150,000 in alcohol, numerous firearms, torture devices, and armored vehicles were found. That same year, he was sentenced to 13 years and was released in 2017. After Dzambo Dzambidze's arrest, L. Margia replaced him as leader, becoming the head of the remnants of the group. In 2017, L. Margia was detained in Turkey. In 2023, the Georgian Investigative Department charged Margia in absentia for criminal activity and connections with thieves in law.
