= Azerbaijani mafia =

Organized crime groups consisting of ethnic Azerbaijanis

Azerbaijani Mafia
- Founding location: Moscow, Saint-Peterburg, Munich, Boston, New York, Los Angeles, Italy
- Territory: Russia, USA, European Union, Ukraine, Georgia and all other post-Soviet states.
- Ethnicity: Azerbaijani, Lezgins, Avars and others
- Criminal activities: Drug trafficking, Arms trafficking, Assassination, Assault, Auto theft, Bank fraud, Blackmailing, Bribery, Car bombing, Contract killing, Extortion, Fraud, Human trafficking, Infiltration of Politics, Illegal gambling, Insurance fraud, Kidnapping, Money laundering, Murder, Police corruption, Political corruption, Racketeering, Tax evasion, Theft, Witness intimidation, Witness tampering.
- Allies: Turkish mafia Pakistani mafia Russian mafia Chechen mafia
- Rivals: Armenian mafia

The Azerbaijani mafia (Azerbaijani: Azərbaycan mafiyası) is a general term for organized criminal gangs that consist of ethnic Azerbaijanis. In Russia, they are mostly based in Moscow and other major Russian cities like Saint Petersburg. Outside of Russia, they are active in most former Soviet states, Turkey, the Netherlands, Germany and other European countries.

== History ==
The Azerbaijani mafia is one of the oldest crime groups in Russia. Besides a large ethnic Azerbaijani community in Dagestan, Russian cities have always been known destinations for Azerbaijani immigrants. Following the formation of important and powerful organized crime groups among Russians, Chechens, Armenians and Georgians in Moscow, Azerbaijani criminal gangs quickly developed in the early 1980s. In the 1990s, the Azerbaijani groups quickly began their rise to power following the conflicts between the Russian and the Chechen groups. Large-scale immigration of Azerbaijanis to Moscow followed. As well as refugees, ex-guerilla fighters and warlords illegally immigrated to major Russian cities. Since the position of the Chechen mafia groups was at the time greatly weakened, the newly formed Azerbaijani criminal groups were able to take over a large chunk of the heroin trade. At the time, a lot of the trafficking funded military and guerilla operations in the region of Nagorno-Karabakh. After the war ended, a younger generation of impoverished Azerbaijanis living in Moscow and other Russian cities learned their trade, which quickly led to the further formation of Azerbaijani criminal outfits in the former Soviet Union.

== Activities ==
While the most important activity of Azerbaijani gangs was drug trafficking (mostly heroin), they've quickly expanded their operations to other areas of organized crime such as arms trafficking, fraud, money laundering, car theft, extortion, illegal gambling, counterfeiting, prostitution and contract killing. Azerbaijani crime groups have been known to invest in real estate by means of money laundering.

=== In the European Union ===
In 2018, a scandal occurred in the south of France: the incident took place in Colomiers, near Toulouse. A car with Rahim Namazov, an Azerbaijani national, and his wife was shot at. The woman died in the attack. This event revealed the very threat of the Azerbaijani criminal groups in the heart of Europe. Shortly after the attack, the Embassy of Azerbaijan in France informed that the target of the attack was known from Azerbaijani security forces and "likely to be related to the mafia".

=== In Georgia ===
On 3 August 2023, an ethnic Azerbaijani businessman was shot in the area of Lilo Mall market in Tbilisi. The Georgian Chief Prosecutor's Office charged two persons with the murder. According to the prosecutor’s office, the murder was a contract killing and it occurred after the businessman rejected to pay money to the criminal authorities connected to Elmuraz Mamedov, a Gardabani-born Azerbaijani thief in law operating from Poland. The criminal band is believed to be extensively engaged in extortion of vendors in the Lilo Mall market. The group has been active in Ukraine, too. Interpol declared a search for Mamedov by red notice.

Ponichala, an Azerbaijani village within Tbilisi, is one of the drug trafficking hubs in Georgia. Despite the population of the village being only 0.5% of the population of the capital as a whole, 17% of drug-related crimes in Tbilisi are committed in Ponichala.

== See also ==
- Nadir Salifov, a Georgia-born Azerbaijani thief in law
- Rovshan Janiev
