= Ludwig Fainberg =

Israeli mobster and drug trafficker (born 1958)

Leonid "Tarzan" Fainberg also known as Ludwig Lyosha Fainberg (born January 3, 1958) is a Ukrainian mobster. Born in Odesa, Fainberg left the Soviet Union in the early 1980s for Israel, and moved to the United States following the fall of the Soviet Union. In the mid-1990s, Fainberg attempted to purchase a Soviet diesel submarine for use in drug smuggling for a Colombian cocaine cartel. Fainberg lived in Miami between 1990 and 1997 and owned a topless bar called Porky's, named after the movie. He was arrested and convicted of smuggling and racketeering. He spent 30 months in jail before his trial and conviction. As of October 2012 he was in Panama, jailed and awaiting trial for pimping.

After being released by a judge from La Joyita Prison in Panama, the prosecutor appealed the release and wanted to retry the case. Authorities were going to re-arrest Tarzan and his accomplice Tony Galeota. The two fled from Panama to Costa Rica. They hid until they could get their passports stamped, which would allow them to leave Costa Rica. Tarzan fled to Cuba and returned to Moscow. The story of how three hustlers schemed to sell a Soviet submarine to a Colombian drug cartel for $35 million. The book of his life Operation Odessa is written by David Serero.
