= Tariel Oniani =

Georgian mafia boss and 'thief in law' (born 1952)

- Born: 1952 (age 73–74); Georgia
- Other name: Taro
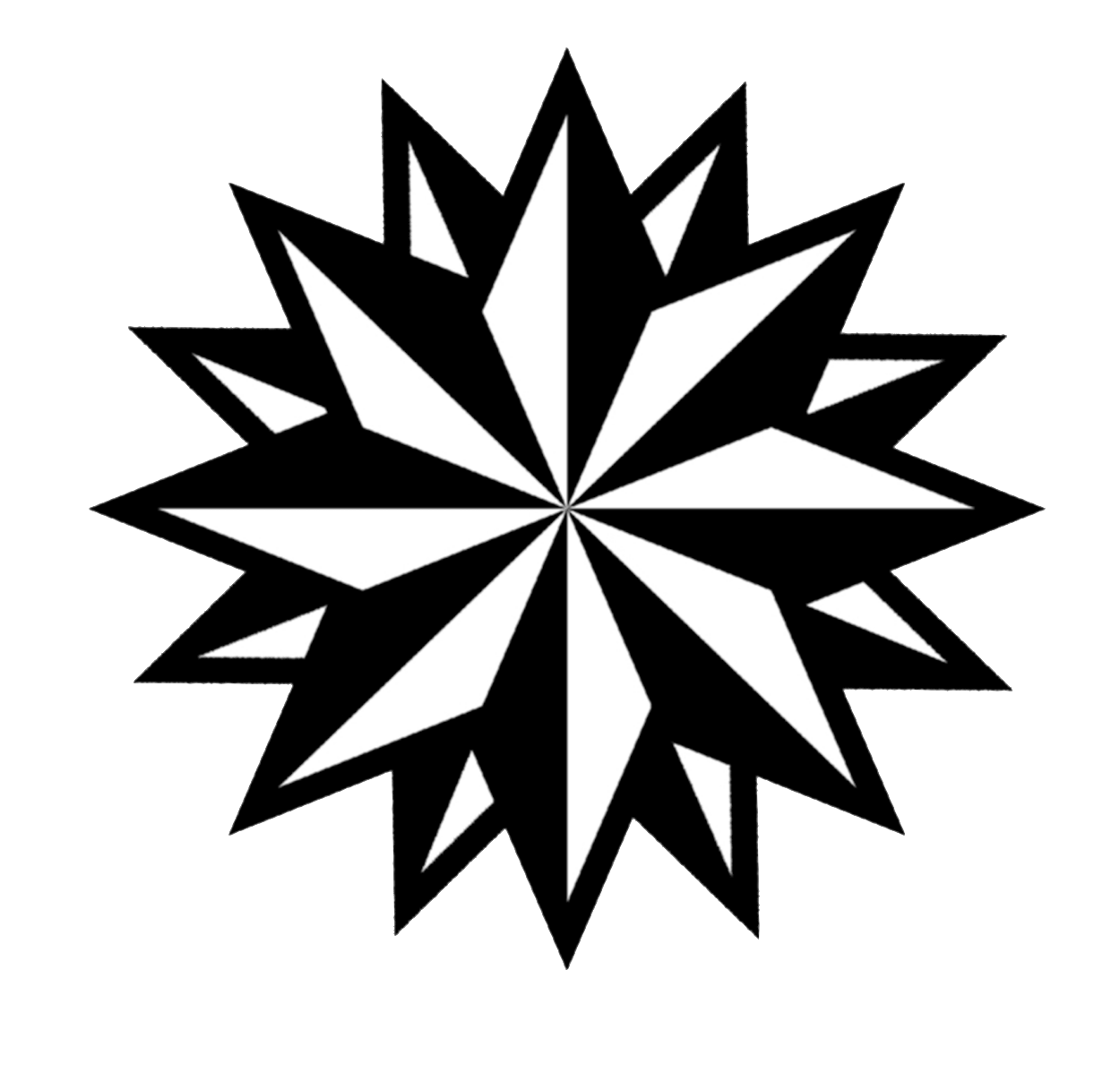
- Status
- Criminal charges: Extortion

Tariel Oniani (Georgian: ტარიელ ონიანი; born 1952) is a Georgian mafia boss and 'thief in law'. He is reportedly a member of the "Kutaisi" criminal gang.

== Background and activity in Spain ==
Born in the mining town of Tkibuli in the former Georgian SSR, Oniani's father died while working in a mine, and Oniani turned to a life of crime. At the age of 17 he was convicted of armed robbery and served time in prison. It was here that he was initiated as a 'vor v zakone', or thief-in-law. By the 1980s he was one of the most prominent thieves-in-law of Moscow.

In the 1990s Oniani moved to Paris, where he was introduced to Alimzhan Tokhtakhunov. After being charged with several crimes, he moved on to Spain, where he owned stock in an airline and where he ran a construction business employing illegal Georgian immigrants until 2005 when Spanish police conducted a large scale operation against his organization. Oniani was charged with money laundering, human trafficking of illegal immigrants, and organizing a criminal gang, but managed to avoid the sting. Meanwhile, 100 of his workers, 28 members of his gang, including business partner Zakhar Kalashov and even his 12-year-old daughter Gvantsa were detained. It was at around this time he was put on Interpol's list of wanted criminals.

== Return to Moscow and gang warfare ==
After the 2005 incident, Tariel Oniani moved back to Moscow, under the assumed identity of Tariel Mulukhov. Tensions grew between Oniani and rival crime boss Aslan "Grandpa Hassan" Usoyan. Around 2007, members of Usoyan's gang started turning up dead, including Armenian national Alek Minalyan, who was allegedly in charge of extorting construction firms working on the 2014 Winter Olympics.

In 2008, in response to the growing violence, a meeting was called on Oniani's private yacht in an attempt to make peace between the two factions. However, Russian authorities were notified of the meeting and used the opportunity to conduct a well-publicised raid and arrest dozens of gangsters. The gangsters were paraded in front of media cameras by police before being detained. The yacht meeting did not break up the violence, and the mobsters turned to noted vor Vyacheslav Ivankov to act as a mediator. Ivankov ended up taking the side of the older and more experienced Usoyan, rather than Oniani, whom he saw as a younger upstart. In July 2009, Ivankov was shot by an assassin with a sniper rifle while leaving a restaurant, and died of his wounds a few months later. It is believed his murder was a result of his taking the side of Usoyan in the gangland dispute.

In December 2011, Spanish newspapers reported that Tariel's mansion in Barcelona had been illegally occupied by squatters. Meanwhile Oniani was placed under arrest in Russia for the kidnapping of a businessman. Russian authorities refused his advocate's bail offer of 15 million rubles. Meanwhile, across Europe, several of his subordinates had been shot dead, including Vladimir Janashia in France and Malhas Kitai in Greece.

In July 2010 Oniani and associates were sentenced to 10 years imprisonment for the kidnapping. Oniani reacted to the verdict with profanity and vowed to appeal. In 2011, Oniani was extradited to serve his sentence in Spain. In January 2013, Aslan Usoyan was killed in Moscow, as competition between him and Oniani increased. However, another possible suspect in the Usoyan murder is believed to be Azerbaijani mobster Rovshan Janiyev. Tariel Oniani was released from prison 9 April 2019, but was immediately arrested again and on 23 October 2019 extradited to Spain.
