= Thief in law =

Type of professional criminal

A thief in law (or thief with code, Russian: вор в зако́не, romanized: vor v zakone) in the Soviet Union, the post-Soviet states, and their respective diasporas is a formal and special status of "criminal authority", a professional criminal who follows certain criminal traditions and enjoys an elite position among other members within organized crime and correctional facility environments and who has informal authority over lower-status members.

The phrase "thief in law" is a calque of the Russian slang phrase vor v zakone, literally translated as 'thief in [a position of] the law'. The phrase has two distinct meanings in Russian: 'legalized thief' and 'thief who is the Law'. Vor (вор) came to mean 'thief' no earlier than the 18th century, before which it meant 'criminal'. The word retains this meaning in the professional criminal argot.

Each new thief is made and vetted, literally a "crowned" male, with respective rituals and tattoos, by the consensus of several Vory (воры). Vor culture is inseparable from prison organized crime: only previously jailed convicts are eligible for Vor status. Thieves in law are drawn from many nationalities from a number of post-Soviet states.

== History ==
Although Russia, Ukraine, Georgia, Armenia had groups of criminals and bandits for a long time, during the disorder of the Russian Revolution of 1917, armed gangs proliferated until they became a very significant factor that controlled society. The criminal culture with its own slang, culture and laws became known as vorovskoy mir (воровской мир, 'thieves' world').

As the police and court system were re-established in the Soviet Union shortly after the 1917 revolution, the NKVD secret police nearly exterminated the criminal underworld completely. Under Stalin, the forced labor camps overflowed with political prisoners and criminals, and a new organized group of top criminals arose, the vory v zakone, or "thieves in law."

The "thieves in law" formed as a society for ruling the criminal underworld within the prison camps, "who govern the dark gaps in Soviet life beyond the reach of the KGB." They adopted a system of collective responsibility, and swore to a code of "complete submission to the laws of criminal life, including obligations to support the criminal ideal, and rejection of labor and political activities."

For example, while incarcerated, a Vor must refuse all work, and is not allowed to assist the warden/correction officers in any way. The thieves' code states: "Your own prison you shall not make." If an inmate walks past a guard, and the guard asks him to ring the dinner bell, the convict must refuse or he will be judged by his fellow inmates and found guilty of assisting his jailers. The Vory organized their own courts and held trials governed by the code of 'thieves' honor and tradition'.

Acceptance into the group is often marked by specific tattoos, allowing all members of the criminal world to instantly recognize a "thief in law". Most prison inmates are tattooed (by other inmates) to indicate their rank within the criminal world, noteworthy criminal accomplishments and places of former incarceration. For example, a tattoo of one cat indicates that the criminal robs alone while multiple cats indicate that he has partners during robberies. Reportedly, "while the Communist Party had a steadfast grip on government and society, the Vory had something of a monopoly on crime."

After World War II, the vory in the Gulag system were weakened by the so-called Bitch Wars – a prison gang war between pure vory and the so-called suki (суки, 'bitches'). The Suki were former members of the criminal underworld who had broken the thieves' code by agreeing to cooperate with administration of prisons and labor camps, and the government, mostly by taking up arms (unacceptable for a thief) and joining a Soviet Army. The Bitch Wars lasted for decades. Due to a large number of suki, most gulags were divided into two separate zones: one for suki and one for vory.

After the breakup of the Soviet Union in the early 1990s, the vory assumed a leading role within the Russian criminal hierarchy (see Russian mafia). The group was able to "infiltrate the top political and economic strata while taking command of the burgeoning crime network that spread murderously through the post-Soviet countries." Thieves In Law are given the title by other vory and in order to be accepted they must demonstrate considerable leadership skills, personal ability, intellect, charisma, along with a well-documented criminal record.

Once accepted they must live according to the thieves' code. The penalty for violation of this code is often mutilation or death. Reportedly, "today the Vory have spread around the world, to Madrid, Berlin, and New York" and are "involved in everything from petty theft to billion-dollar money-laundering while also acting as arbiters among conflicting Russian criminal factions."

Reportedly, as capitalism began to take hold in Russia, an increasing number of college-educated criminals began to take over more lucrative ventures. While these new criminal elements first worked with the Vory in the 1990s, in the 2000s (decade), ties to big business and government grew in importance. Consequently, while the "Vory are still strong in gambling and retail trade," their importance in Russian economy and society has decreased. However, since the majority of criminals eventually are arrested and incarcerated, at some point they will come in contact with the Vory who are at the top of the hierarchy of the criminal world within the penal system in Russia.

In 2011, the Obama administration implemented sanctions against an organization known as the Brothers' Circle, several members of which are thieves-in-law.

== Ethics and code of conduct ==
Ponyatiya (понятия, 'concepts' or 'understandings') are the rules of conduct (or even the customary laws or code of honor) among prison inmates, with Vory being respectful leaders and judges according to these rules.

Vory consider prisons their true home and have a saying, "The home for angels is heaven, and the home for a Vor is prison." According to Aleksandr Gurov, an expert on the Vory who headed the organized crime units of the Soviet Interior Ministry and the GRU, "unlike the Cosa Nostra the Vory have 'less rules, but more severe rules' [and the] members must have no ties to the government, meaning they cannot serve in the army or cooperate with officials while in prison. They must also have served several jail sentences before they can be considered. They also are not allowed to get married."

Furthermore, according to Michael Schwirtz, "ethnicity has rarely determined whether someone can join the club, and today many members, even those active inside Russia, are from other post-Soviet countries such as Armenia, Georgia, and are not ethnic Russians."

Aleksandr Solzhenitsyn, author of The Gulag Archipelago, claimed never to have seen any thief honor the code if it conflicted with his personal criminal wants.

== Vory tattoos ==
The Vory subculture (more exactly: the prison inmate subculture where Vory are the leaders) is well known for having symbolic tattoos. The tattoos are usually done in the prison with primitive tools.

Tattoos associated with the thieves in law include, but are not limited to:

- The eight-pointed star is the main tattoo in vorovskoy mir and usually appears on the shoulders.
- Madonna and Child indicates a criminal lifestyle from a young age.
- A spider tattoo, when facing up, denotes an active criminal; facing down, it denotes one who has left the lifestyle.
- A circled A (done in the style of a finger ring) indicates an anarchist.
- A circle with a dot inside (as finger ring) known as "The Roundstone" indicates an orphan or the saying "Rely only upon yourself" (надейся только на себя, nadeisya tolko na sebya).
- A skull inside a square (as finger ring) indicates a conviction for aggravated robbery.
- A lozenge with an Orthodox cross inside (as finger ring) indicates a thief-in-law.
- A circle with the left half black, right half white (as finger ring) indicates one who moves around thieves-in-law, but is not one himself (в кругу воров, v krugu vorov, 'in the circle of thieves').
- The letters КОТ (KOT, lit. 'male cat') indicate a native-born prison inmate (коренной обитатель тюрьмы, korennoy obitatel tiurmy). Cats are very respected among the Russian prisoners, unlike dogs, considered to be a "cops animals". If inmates are lucky to domesticate the cat, it gets the best treatment it can get.
- The letters ОМУТ (OMUT, lit. 'deep water hole') on the back of the hand indicate "It's hard to get away from me" (от меня уйти трудно, ot menya uyti trudno).
- The letters МИР (MIR, lit. 'world' or 'peace') on the back of the hand denote one who will never be rehabilitated or re-educated (меня исправит расстрел, menya ispravit rasstrel, 'a shooting will rehabilitate me').
- The word СЕВЕР (SEVER; lit. 'north') on the back of the hand indicates having served a prison sentence in a northern prison (Siberia or Magadan).
- A cat in a hat (from Puss in Boots) on the back of the hand is the symbol of thieves in law and, as such, denotes one.
- The head of the Devil (Fenya: оскал, oskal, 'bared teeth'; Russian: голова дьявола, romanized: golova diavola) on the back of the hand denotes one who harbours anger towards the government.
- The quincunx on the wrist indicates one who has served extensive prison sentences, from the saying "four guard towers and me" (четыре вышки и я, chetyre vyshki i ya).

== Notable thieves in law ==
While there still are many ethnic Georgians, many also are drawn from other ethnic groups from the former Soviet Union.

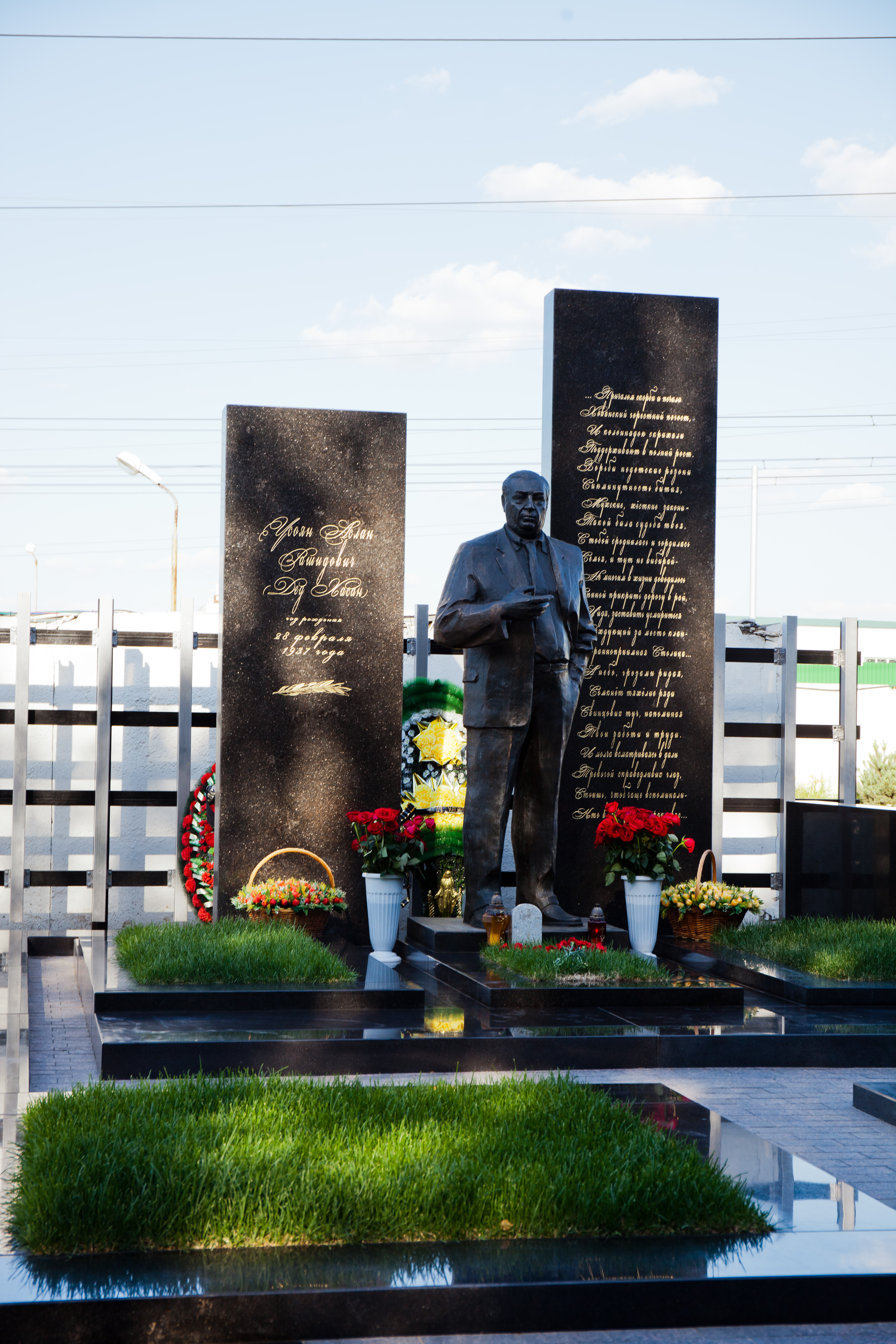
Grave of Aslan Usoyan with statue (Khovanskoye Cemetery, Moscow)

Name	Nickname	Place of birth	Ethnicity	Status
Aslan Usoyan	Ded Khasan, Baba Gurgur	Tbilisi, Georgian SSR	Georgian/Yezidi	Dead
Rovshan Janiyev	Lankaransky	Lankaran, Azerbaijani SSR	Azerbaijani/Talysh	Dead
Tariel Oniani	Taro	Tkibuli, Georgian SSR	Georgian	Detained
Zakhariy Kalashov	Shakro Molodoi	Tbilisi, Georgian SSR	Georgian/Yezidi	Released
Nadir Salifov	Lotu Guli	Dmanisi, Georgian SSR	Azerbaijani	Dead
Evsei Agron	Leningradsky	Leningrad, Russian SFSR	Russian Jew	Dead
Jaba Ioseliani	Duba	Khashuri, Georgian SSR	Georgian	Dead
Dzambo Dzambidze	Djumbo Molodoi	Rustavi, Georgian SSR	Georgian	Released
Vyacheslav Ivankov	Yaponchik	Moscow, Russian SFSR	Russian	Dead
Bakhtiyar Kerimov	Lotu Bakhtiyar	Novkhany, Azerbaijani SSR	Azerbaijani	Dead
Rafael Bagdasaryan	Svo Raf	Yerevan, Armenian SSR	Armenian	Dead
Andranik Soghoyan	Zap	Yerevan, Armenian SSR	Armenian	Released
Valery Dlugach	Globus	Buda-Kashalyova, Byelorussian SSR	Belarusian Jew	Dead
Razhden Shulaya	Roma, Brother	Leningrad, Russian SFSR	Georgian	Imprisoned
Namik Salifov	Bakinski	Dmanisi, Georgian SSR	Azerbaijani	Released
Vagif Suleymanov	Diplomat	Tbilisi, Georgian SSR	Azerbaijani	Detained
Dzemal Mikeladze	Djemo	Vladikavkaz, Georgian SSR	Azerbaijani	Dead
Luka Gabadadze	Gubaza	Gori, Georgian SSR	Georgian	imprisoned

== See also ==
- State capture
- Armenian mafia
- Crime boss
- Criminal tattoos
- Kazan phenomenon
- Made man
- Prison gang
- Azeri mafia
- Thieves by Law (2010 documentary by Alexander Gentelev)
