= Vyacheslav Ivankov =

Russian mobster

- Вячеслав Иваньков
- Born: 2 January 1940; Tbilisi, Georgian SSR, Soviet Union
- Died: 9 October 2009 (aged 69); Moscow, Russia
- Resting place: Vagankovo Cemetery, Moscow
- Other name: Yaponchik (Little Japanese)
- Occupations: Thief, gangster, racketeer, drug-trafficker
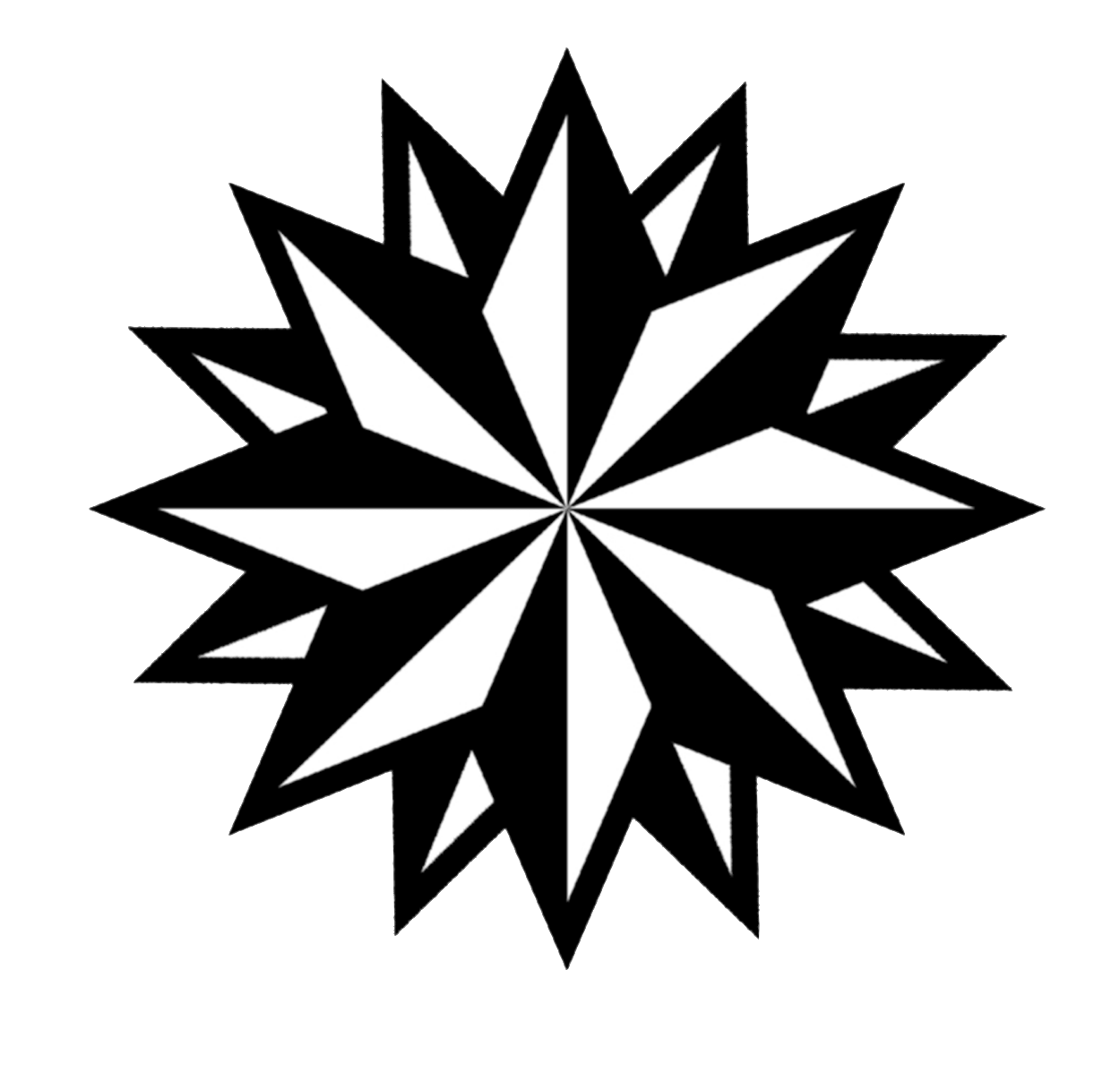
- Status
- Criminal charge: extortion
- Penalty: 10 years in American prison and 10 in Russian prison camp

Vyacheslav Kirillovich Ivankov (Russian: Вячеслав Кириллович Иваньков; 2 January 1940 – 9 October 2009) was a Russian mafia boss and thief in law who was believed to have connections with Russian state intelligence organizations and their organized crime partners. He operated in both the Soviet Union and the United States. His nickname, "Yaponchik" (Япончик), translates from Russian as "Little Japanese", due to his faintly Asian facial features.

== Early life ==
Ivankov was born in Soviet Georgia to parents of Russian ethnicity, Olga Gostasvits and Bernard Royal-Ivankov, and lived on Iosebidze Street, in the capital Tbilisi. He grew up in Moscow. Ivankov was an amateur wrestler in his youth and served his first prison time for his participation in a bar fight, in which he claimed he was defending the honor of a woman. After his release, he began to move up in the criminal world, selling goods on the black market. Later Ivankov became involved in gang activity. His gang used forged police documents to enter houses and then burglarize them. In 1974, in Butyrka prison he was "crowned" i.e. awarded by criminal brotherhood the title of vor v zakone (thief in law).

In 1982, authorities had finally caught up with him and he was arrested on firearms, forgery and drug-trafficking charges. Though he was sentenced to fourteen years he was released in 1991, reportedly thanks to the intervention of a powerful politician and a bribed judge of the Russian supreme court.

Ivankov was an ardent anti-Communist.

== Moving to the United States ==
According to Alexander Litvinenko, Ivankov headed the narcotics trafficking of the Uzbek network in the United States. Robert Eringer confirmed this.

Ivankov arrived in the United States in March 1992, despite having served a prison sentence of around ten years and a reputation as one of the fiercest and one of the most brutal criminals in Russia. Unlike the Cosa Nostra, where the boss gives out the orders, Ivankov used to go out and extort himself. He had arrived on a regular business visa stating that he would be working in the film industry. His front company in the United States was Slavic, Inc.

His reason for arriving in the United States was not initially clear. The Russian Ministry of Internal Affairs advised the FBI that Ivankov had come to "manage and control Russian Organized Crime activities in this country", advice that the FBI took on board. However Alexander Grant, editor for newspaper Novoye Russkoye Slovo said in 1994 Ivankov had left Russia because it was too dangerous for him there, since there are "new criminal entrepreneurs who don't respect the likes of Yaponchik" and that he was not criminally active in the United States. However, Ivankov did become criminally active in the United States. The actual scope of his activities is unclear, since conflicting sources describe his gang on Brighton Beach as around 100 members strong and being the "premier Russian crime group in Brooklyn" to something on the scale of Lucky Luciano's nationwide Mafia Commission many decades earlier.

Ivankov was arrested by the FBI on June 8, 1995, charged with the extortion of $2.7 million from an investment advisory firm known as Summit, ran by two Russian businessmen, and in June the next year he was convicted along with multiple codefendants. At the time of his arrest, Ivankov was found to be in possession of thousands of dollars and seven different passports under different names and countries. A .38 caliber revolver wrapped in a sock was determined by witnesses to have been thrown from the apartment in which Ivankov resided.

During interviews in prison, Ivankov accused the FBI of inventing the "myth" of the Russian mafia in order to prove the usefulness of their Russian division. He stated that Russia "is one uninterrupted criminal swamp," the main criminals being the Kremlin and the FSB and that anybody who thinks he is the leader of the so-called Russian mafia is foolish. He was subsequently transferred from a jail in Brooklyn to the more secure Manhattan Detention Complex (MDC) in Manhattan and then Otisville FCI. Ivankov was incarcerated with his cousin Eugene Slusker, who was also charged in the case. In prison, he became an associate of Pavle Stanimirović, son of Vojislav Stanimirović. Ivankov, Slusker and Stanimirović all retained and utilized the services of attorney Robert S. Wolf; the first American lawyer to ever be allowed entry into Russian Gulag prisons in Siberia.

== Semyan "Sam" Kislin ==
Semyan "Sam" Kislin (born 1934 or 1935 Odesa) was "a member or associate" of Ivankov per a 1994 FBI report obtained by the Associated Press. Kislin of Trans Commodities Inc. who hired Michael Cherney to manage Trans Commodities from 1988 to 1992, made donations to Rudy Giuliani's mayoral campaigns in the 1990s. Kislin issued numerous mortgages to investors, who were overwhelmingly associated with countries from the former Soviet Union, in the 2001 opened Trump World Tower. Kislin, who states that he is very close to the Cherney brothers, claims that he persuaded his ally Giuliani to have President Trump claim that Ukraine is full of corruption.

== Return to Russia ==
On July 13, 2004, Ivankov was deported to Russia to face murder charges over two Turkish nationals who were shot in a Moscow restaurant following a heated argument in 1992. A third was seriously wounded in the alleged incident. The jury found him not guilty and he was acquitted the same day on July 18, 2005. The witnesses, a police officer among them, claimed to have never seen him in their lives.

== 2009 assassination ==
On July 28, 2009, at around 19:20 Moscow time, Ivankov was shot while leaving a restaurant on Khoroshevskoye Road in Moscow. A sniper rifle was found abandoned in a nearby parked vehicle.

Having died from his injuries seventy-three days later, on October 9, 2009, Ivankov was buried in Moscow on October 13, 2009. The funeral was well-publicised, receiving widespread media attention in Russia and worldwide. In attendance were hundreds of gangsters representing criminal syndicates from around the former USSR, each sending their own tributes. One card at the funeral read "From the Dagestani Bratva", another "From the Kazakh Bratva" and one elaborate wreath came from Aslan "Grandpa Hassan" Usoyan who was not himself in attendance. It is suspected that the murder was carried out as part of an ongoing gang war between Usoyan and Georgian crime boss Tariel Oniani, where Ivankov took Usoyan's side.

As a part of the special police operation "Wasp" (Russian: спецоперация «Оса»), Lasha Shushanashvili (Lasha Rustavsky) (Russian: Лаша Шушанашвили (Лаша Руставский); b. 25 July 1961 Rustavi, Georgia), who is close to Aslan Usoyan (Ded Khasan) (Russian: Аслан Усоян (Дед Хасан)) and is in the Brothers' Circle, was arrested in Greece in late January 2012 as the main beneficiary in Ivankov's death and for the attempted murder of Ded Khasan. Previously, his younger brother "Koba" or Kakhaber Shushanashvili (Kakha Rustavsky) (Russian: Кахабер Шушанашвили (Каха Руставский)) and Zviad Darsadze (Russian: Звиад Дарсадзе), who was his chief accountant or keeper of the obschak (common fund) (Russian: Общак), were arrested in Barcelona on March 15, 2010 as part of the Spanish police operation "Java" (Russian: полицейской операции «Ява») and extradited to Georgia in early January 2012 but the police in Greece were unable to detain Lasha Shushanashvili when they attempted to arrest him in Thessaloniki. On 3 February 2009, he was arrested for an illegal visit to Russia after which he had to leave Russia within 15 days because on 8 September 2008 he was deemed persona non grata due to his falsifying his papers when he requested Russian citizenship and took refuge in Greece.

== Ivankov successor: Alexei Petrov aka Alexei Suvorov ==
Following the death of Ivankov in 2009, Alexei Petrov (Russian: Алексей Петров; 13 November 1962 Moscow, USSR - 1 August 2019 Zaporizhzhia, Ukraine), also known as Alexei Suvorov (Russian: Алексей Суворов) Lyonya Sly, Lenya the Tricky, or Petrik, became the successor to Ivankov. Just before Ivankov's death, Petrov was the first vor to visit Ivankov while Ivankov was in the hospital at which time Ivankov named Petrov as his successor. Living among Israel, Germany and Austria, he headed the Mazutka gang or Mazutkinskaya OPG (Russian: Мазуткинская ОПГ). When Ivankov left for the United States in March 1992, Petrov headed Ivankov's affairs in Moscow, Russia, and Europe. In 1993 under police surveillance, he left Russia for Ukraine where he married his Ukrainian wife and took her surname then left for Austria and then Nice, France, where the police had great difficulty finding him after his name changed. In 1995, the French detained him on falsified papers, however, the judge released him. Allegedly, he was involved in trafficking narcotics from Central and South America and helped organize the 3 November 1996 assassination of 41 year old Paul Tatum, a co-owner of the Radisson Slavyanskaya Hotel in Moscow. Upon Yapochik's attempted assassination in 2009 which led to Ivankov's death, Petrov returned to Moscow to be at the side of his godfather Ivankov. Although Petrov tried to prevent the collapse of Ivankov's criminal empire, both Mikhas's Solntsevskaya and the Semion Mogilevich crime network gained Ivankov's criminal assets. Upon Aslan Usoyan's (Ded Khasan) death on 16 January 2013, Petrov became a "judge" over matters involving vory. On 1 August 2019, Petrov was beaten and stabbed to death by two men in Zaporizhzhia, Ukraine.

== Personal ==
Ivankov's son, Eduard Ivankov, often represented his father's interests at meetings with Semion Mogilevich who was very close to the elder Ivankov.
