= Rovshan Janiyev =

Azerbaijani Mafia boss

Rovshan Janiyev Rövşən Canıyev
- Born: 7 January 1975; Lankaran, Azerbaijani SSR, Soviet Union
- Died: 18 August 2016 (aged 41); Istanbul, Turkey
- Other name: Rovshan Lankaransky
- Citizenship: Russia; Azerbaijan
- Children: Nuradin Janiyev
- Parent(s): Rafig Janiyev; Mesude Janıyeva
- Relatives: Namig Janiyev (brother)
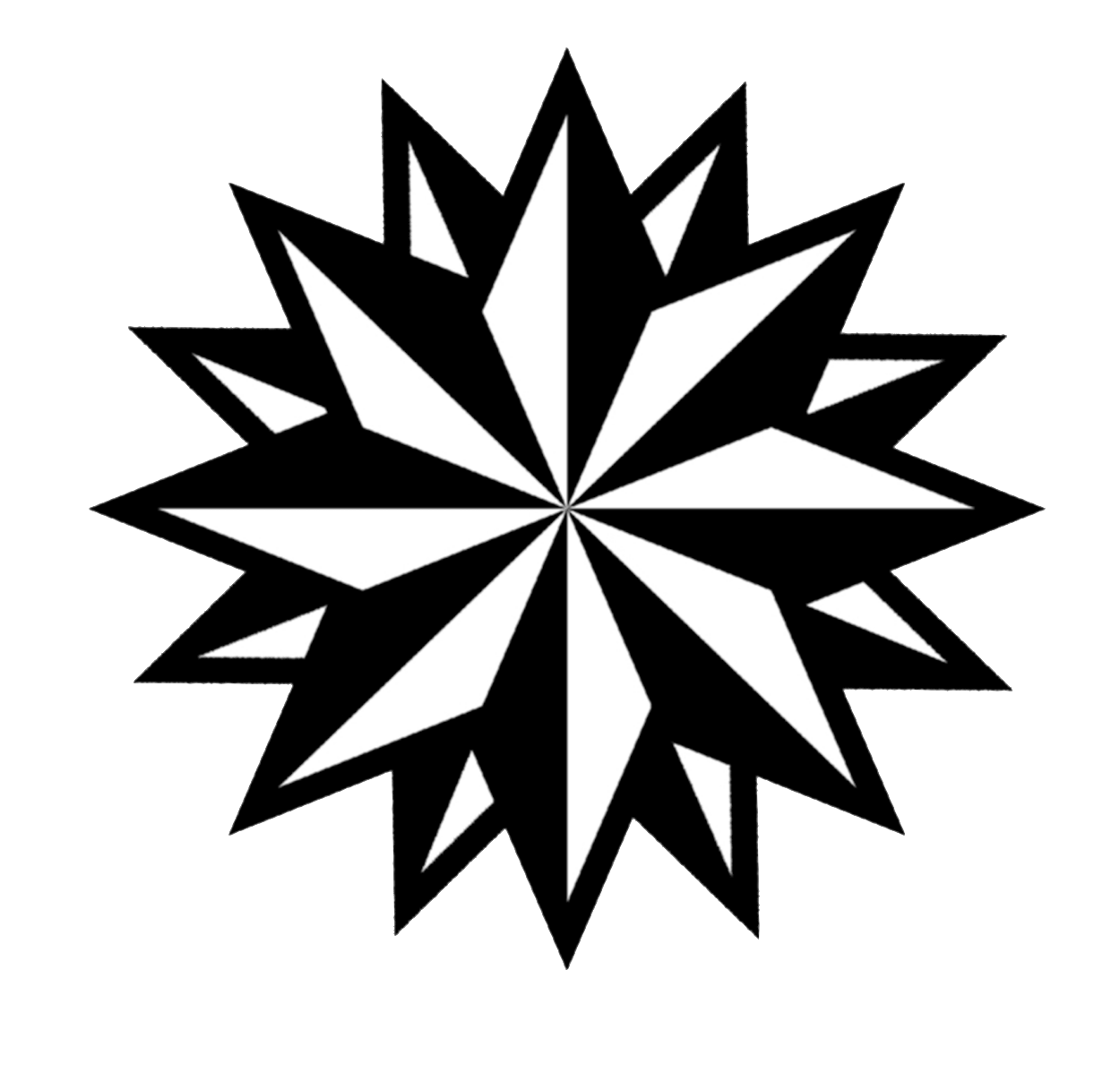
- Status

Rovshan Janiyev (Azerbaijani: Rövşən Rafiq oğlu Canıyev, Russian: Ровшан Рафик оглы Джаниев; 27 January 1975 – 18 August 2016), also known as Rovshan Lankaransky (Azerbaijani: Rövşən Lənkəranski, Russian: Ровшан Ленкоранский), was a major Azerbaijani gangster of Talysh descent.

== Early life ==
Born to an ethnic Talysh family, Janiyev's father, who was a Policeman, was murdered by local gangsters whom he had been investigating, when he was 17. In 1996 during the court hearing, upon hearing the accused threatening his family, Janiyev pulled out a gun and killed him in court. He was sentenced to two years in prison.

Janiyev was "crowned" in 2002 on the initiative of thief in law Mirseymur Abdullaev, a Talysh man from Nardaran. An informant for Novaya Gazeta told that “all his [Janiyev's] people” were Talysh. Though many of his closest acquiantances, such as Vagif Suleymanov and Dzemal Mikeladze, were in fact ethnic Azeri.

== Criminal career ==
Later in 2000, he shot a prominent Baku crime boss in broad daylight and was subsequently beaten so severely that during his plea, he claimed to have developed a mental illness. Taking this into account, the court released him after just a few months imprisonment.

Fearing for his life, Janiyev fled from Azerbaijan to Moscow, where he grew more and more powerful within the underworld, and eventually controlled all the ethnic Azerbaijani gangs in Moscow, running protection rackets and drug trafficking rings.

Eventually competition over territory grew with the Caucasian gangs led by Aslan Usoyan. In 2010 an attempt was made on Usoyan's life and it was believed that Janiyev, who had been arrested trying to enter Ukraine shortly afterwards, had a major part in its planning and execution.

In January 2013, after Usoyan's assassination, Janiyev was the main suspect, Tariel Oniani was also regarded as a primary suspect. Shortly afterwards, Astamur Guliya, an Abkhaz gangster and close ally of Janiyev, was gunned down in Sukhumi. Janiyev himself was reported killed in Istanbul on 6 February of that year, but this claim was denied by his brother Emil, who claimed he was alive and well in the United Arab Emirates.

In 2013, Italian law enforcement authorities reported Janiyev's presence in the country to Interpol. In a law enforcement report, Janiyev was accused of being engaged in organized crime, bribery, money laundering and forgery of documents.

== Death ==
On 17 August 2016 Janiyev was assassinated in Istanbul, Turkey, after returning from a trip to Dubai. Janiyev was shot in his luxury Range Rover car, which bore an Azerbaijani license plate, in the Beşiktaş district. Janiyev's local driver was also killed on the spot. Janiyev himself was transported to Şişli Etfal hospital and died of his wounds there. Janiyev's corpse was flown to Azerbaijan via a private plane belonging to Azerbaijani billionaire Mübariz Mansimov. Reports emerged that more than 25,000 people came to mourn him at the airport. Yeni Musavat columnist Ilgar Kamil explained the phenomenon of glorifying Janiyev through the pratfall effect, according to which people would excuse Janiyev's criminal past, because he had avenged his father "in due manner" as a teenager. Another reason according to Kamil, is the tendency to subconsciously admire someone who does what others would like to do but do not dare to.
