= Aslan Usoyan =

Mafia boss Russian mobster

- Born: Aslan Rashidovich Usoyan; 27 February 1937; Tbilisi, Georgian SSR, Soviet Union
- Died: 16 January 2013 (aged 75); Moscow, Russia
- Cause of death: Assassination
- Other name: Ded Hassan
- Citizenship: Russian
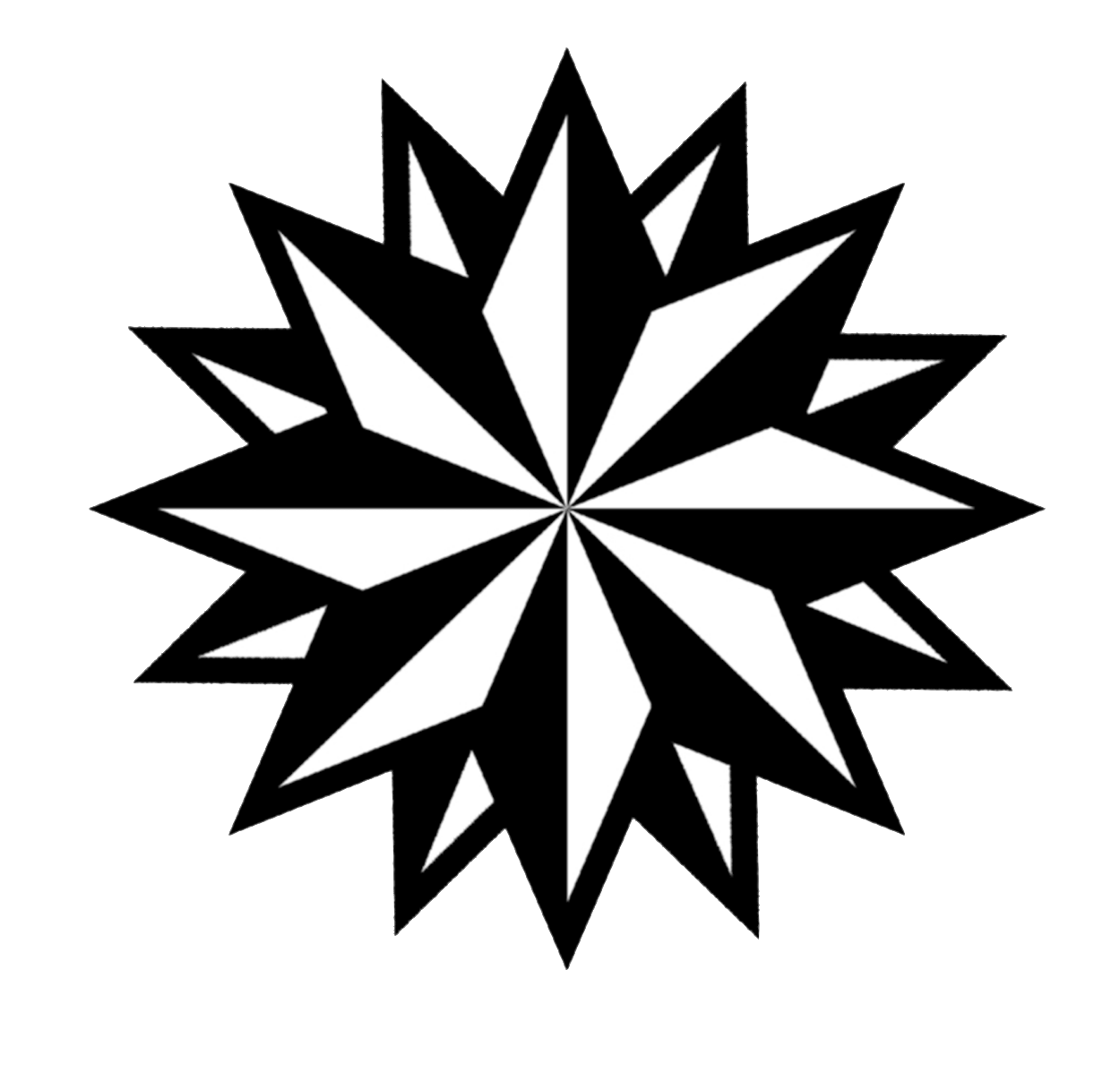
- Status
- Criminal charges: extortion
- Penalty: 8 imprisonments
- Accomplices: Zakhariy Kalashov; Datiko Tsikhelashvili; Dzambo Dzambidze; Shakro Kakachia

Aslan Rashidovich Usoyan (Georgian: ასლან რაშიდოვიჩ უსოიანი, Russian: Асла́н Раши́дович Усоя́н; 27 February 1937 – 16 January 2013), also known as Baba Gurgur and Grandpa Hassan ("Дед Хасан") or just Grandpa ("Дедушка"), was a Georgian-born Soviet-Russian crime boss of Yazidi Kurdish descent, who began his career operating in Georgia, continued in Moscow, Ural, Siberia, Uzbekistan, Krasnodar, Sochi, and other parts of the former Soviet Union. According to The Economist, he was 'reputed to be Russia's mafia boss'.

== Criminal acts ==
In 1992, Aslan Usoyan was released and called a meeting of important criminal authorities. At this meeting, he quarreled with Igor Tarlanov. After his release, Usoyan lived in Yekaterinburg for a while, then officially registered in Gorodovikovsk, but spent most of his time in Moscow and the North Caucasus.

Usoyan had the greatest influence in the North Caucasus. Also, during the Abkhazia conflict, Usoyan financially helped the Abkhaz side, which is why he was suspected of involvement in the disappearance in Moscow of the old 'thief in law' Givi Beradze (Givi Rezany), who helped Georgian troops.

Usoyan also retained significant influence in the Ural, but a brutal war broke out there between various criminal groups, including those who supported the Hasan clan. In May 1992, businessman Igor Tarlanov was shot dead in Yekaterinburg (his son Pavel had disappeared in April 1992). In June 1992, the 'thief in law' Alexander Khorkov (Khorek), who had helped search for the Tarlanovs' killers, was killed with a pistol. In August 1992, at a meeting of representatives of the criminal world, which took place in the Yekaterinburg, the Slavic 'thieves in law' Viktor Sidorenko and Bozhenka condemned Hasan's actions, which led to a wave of violence. In November 1993, the 'thief in law' Lyosha Sverdlovsky was shot dead in a casino in Yekaterinburg.

On May 30, 1995, in Moscow, operatives seized about 2 kilograms of jewelry and 380 thousand US dollars in cash during a search of Usoyan's rented apartment. By 1994, Aslan Usoyan began to increase his influence in the North Caucasus and Georgia. This led to a series of murders and kidnappings, as well as a war between the Tbilisi criminal group and the Rustavi criminal group, who supported Aslan Usoyan, and the Kutasis criminal group, which did not support Aslan Usoyan.

Starting in 2007, Usoyan was embroiled in a gang war with Georgian mobster Tariel Oniani, who was seeking to reestablish himself in Moscow. Several of Usoyan's top lieutenants were killed including the Armenian national Alek Minalyan, a man allegedly in charge of extorting construction firms working on the 2014 Winter Olympics. In July 2008 police raided Oniani's yacht as a meeting took place amongst the criminal leaders in an attempt to settle the conflict. Usoyan was not however amongst those detained. He later gave an interview to a newspaper, denying the stories of escalating violence and stated that 'We are a peaceful people and don't bother anybody, we are for peace in order to prevent lawlessness'.

Vyacheslav Ivankov was brought in to mediate the conflict, in which he sided with Usoyan's faction. He was however shot by a sniper while leaving a Moscow restaurant in July 2009, and died of his wounds in October that year. Although he did not attend, Usoyan sent an elaborate wreath to Ivankov's funeral saying 'To our brother from Grandpa Hassan'.

In April 2010, Usoyan was arrested by Ukrainian security forces after entering the country illegally using false documents. His business in Ukraine was allegedly connected to a rift with an Armenian organized crime group. On 16 September 2010, Usoyan was shot by a 9 mm calibre bullet fired by an unidentified assailant in central Moscow, but survived the attack along with his bodyguard who was also wounded. It was at first announced to the press that Usoyan had died to ensure his safety.

In the early 2010s the Obama administration placed sanctions on members of the alleged criminal organisation the Brothers' Circle. It has been speculated that the so-called circle is a stand-in for Usoyan's network.

== Alleged ties to PKK ==
Usoyan, an ethnic Kurd, was accused of supplying money and weapons to the Kurdistan Workers' Party (PKK).

== Death ==
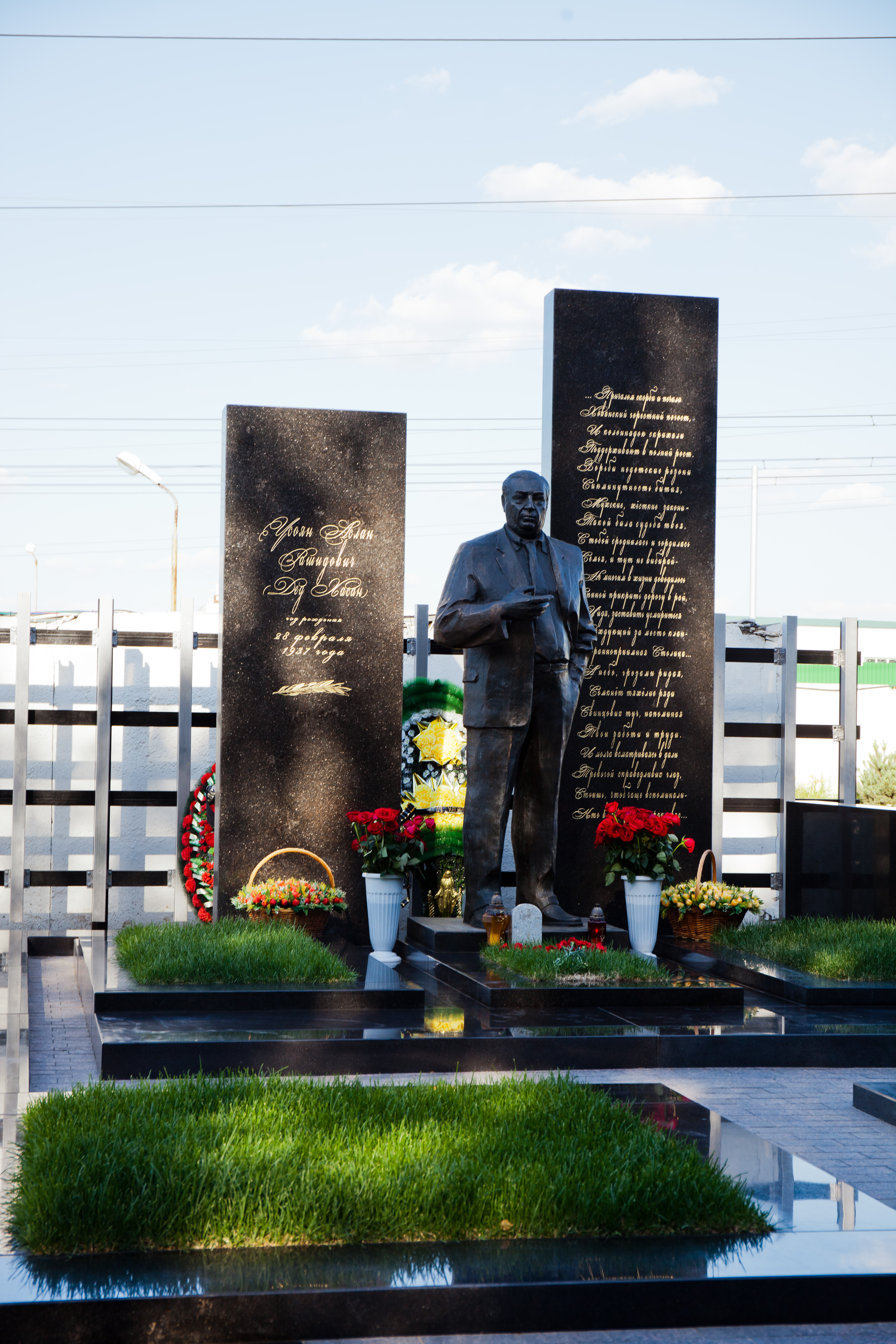
Gravestone with statue (Khovanskoye Cemetery, Moscow)

On 16 January 2013 and a month before his 76th birthday, Usoyan was shot in the head by a sniper perched on the sixth floor of an adjacent apartment building after leaving a restaurant which served as his office, and despite efforts of his bodyguards and ambulance workers he died en route to the hospital. The family decided to fly Usoyan's body to be buried in his native Tbilisi, but the Tbilisi International Airport refused to accept the plane. His death was thought to be likely to spur chaos in the criminal world. The day Usoyan was shot dead, an Armenian crime fiction writer, Sergey Galoyan, said in a conversation with a local news website that the mafia king's murder might be linked to a certain unrest in the criminal world, particularly the construction of the Sochi Olympic facilities which are said to have attracted considerable investments.

The main suspects behind Usoyan's murder are Tariel Oniani and Rovshan Janiev.

== Personal life ==
Aslan Usoyan's wife was Dulsha Avdoeva (born in 1937), with whom Usoyan had two children - daughter Nuna (born in 1960) and son Nodari (born in 1962). Nodari was a co-founder of several commercial structures. Nodari also had shares in enterprises registered abroad, in particular in Austria. Nodari Usoyan is completely clean before the law. However, the companies in which he was a co-founder were involved in criminal cases. Religiously, Usoyan was a Yazidi.

== See also ==
- Zakhariy Kalashov
