= Sergei Mikhailov (businessman) =

Russian gangster

Sergei Anatolyevich Mikhailov
- Сергей Анатольевич Михайлов
- Born: 7 February 1958 (age 68); Moscow, Russian SFSR, Soviet Union
- Other name: Mikhas
- Occupations: Businessman, criminal
- Known for: Founder and leader of Solntsevskaya Bratva

Sergei Anatolyevich Mikhailov (Russian: Серге́й Анатольевич Михайлов; born February 7, 1958), nickname Mikhas, is a Russian criminal and leader of the Solntsevskaya Bratva criminal syndicate.

== Biography ==
Mikhailov was originally a waiter, but moved into the criminal world in 1987 after a conviction for fraud in 1984. Together with Viktor Averin, Mikhas formed the Solntsevo group in the late 1980s, where he was born and raised.

François Tharin, a Vaud immigration attorney, who was the former head of the Cantonial Office of Foreigners (French: l'Office cantonal des étrangers du canton de Vaud) obtained both Mikhailov's proper immigration papers and Vaud approval in January 1996 after Mikhailov had purchased a 800,000 Swiss franc villa in Borex, Vaud, at the end of 1995 through an intermediary Vaud industrialist. (Note: In the 2000s, François Tharin of FT Conseils in Lausanne became a partner with the attorney sons of Yuri Chaika, Igor and Artem Chaika. Igor Chaika became a partner in 2013 and Artem Chaika purchased a 40% stake in the firm on 5 February 2015 from Igor. Since 2014, Igor Chaika is an advisor to the Governor of Moscow Oblast, Andrey Vorobyov. With Swiss residence, Artem Chaika lives in Fone at $3 million home which is owned in the name of Bogdan Lisurenko. The Chaikas are closely associated with the four owners of the firm Sugar Kubani LLC (Russian: ООО «Сахар Кубани»). The owners are Angela Maria Tsapok (Russian: Анжела-Мария Цапок) and Natalya Tsepovyaz (Russian: Наталья Цеповяз), who are wives of Sergei Tsapok (Russian: Сергей Цапков) and Vyacheslav Tsepovyaz (Russian: Вячеслав Цеповяз) of The Tsapkov Gang from Kushchevskaya (Russian: Кущёвская) in northern Krasnodar Krai, and Nadezhda Staroverova (Russian: Надежда Староверова) and Olga Alekseevna Lopatina (Russian: Ольга Алексеевна Лопатина), who are the wives of high ranking prosecutors Alexei Staroverov (Russian: Алексей Староверов) and Gennady Lopatin (Russian: Геннадий Лопатин), respectively.) Mikhailov had been referred to Tharin from his business friends André Milowanow and Olivier Demaurex of the financial firm SCFI Holding, whose offices are along avenue CF Ramuz in Pully, and had arranged for the Line SA company in Penthalaz to improve Moscow's water lines.

On 16 October 1996, Mikhas was arrested in at the Cointrin Airport, Geneva, Switzerland on charges of false documents and a law about foreigners owning property. He was later acquitted and allowed to walk free from the court after spending two years in jail waiting for the trial. One of the witnesses, Vadim Rosenbaum (Russian: Вадим Розенбаум) who was chairman of the Fund cooperative (Russian: кооператив "Фонд"), was shot dead in Amsterdam before Rosenbaum could testify.

During the Swiss trial in Geneva, Mikhailov's attorney in Switzerland was Ralph Oswald Isenegger and in Russia was Sergei Pogramkov (Russian: Сергей Пограмков).
