= Zakhariy Kalashov =

Russian mafia boss (born 1953)

- Born: Zakhariy Knyazevich Kalashov; 20 March 1953 (age 73); Tbilisi, Georgian SSR, USSR
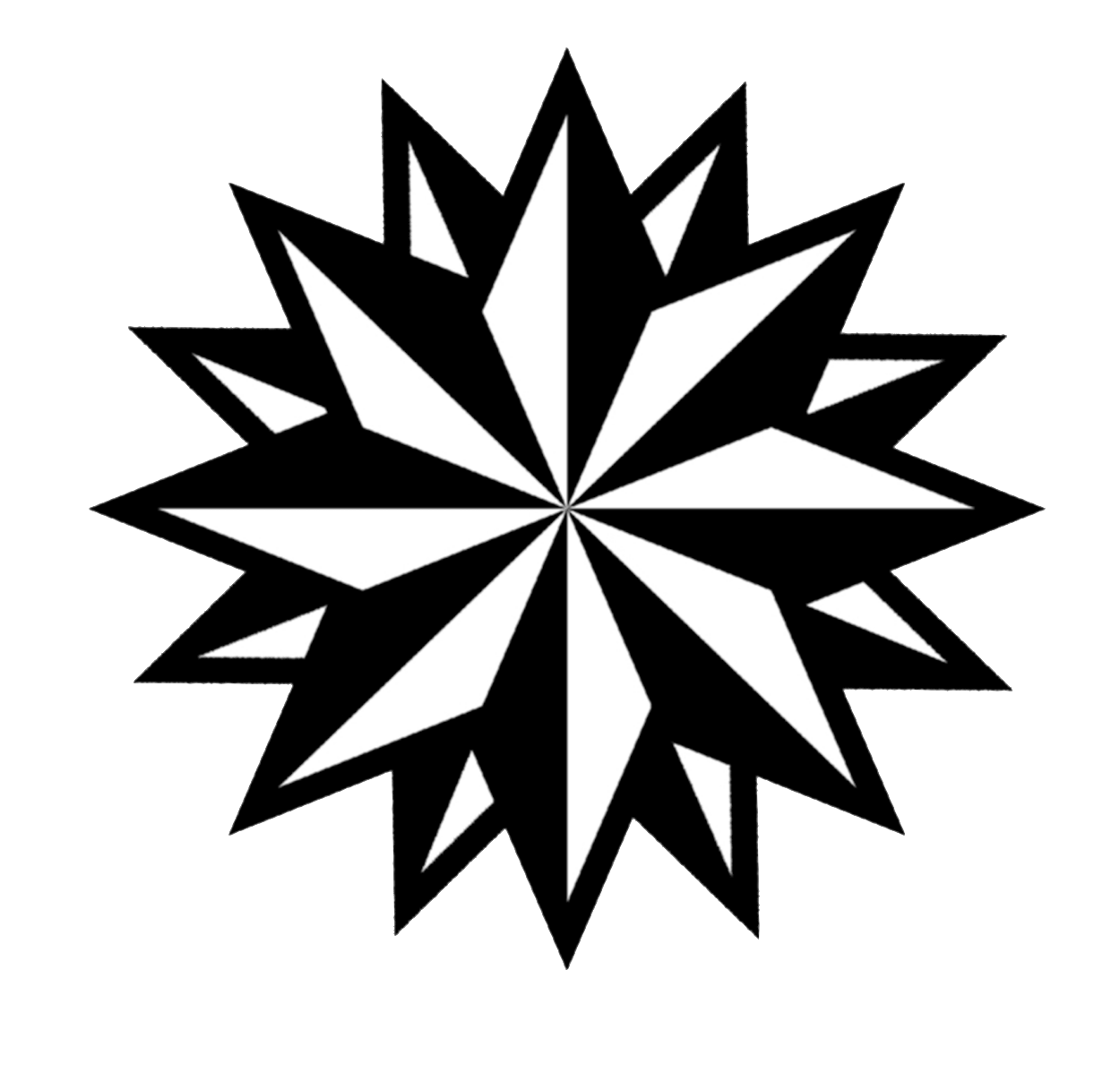
- Status
- Allegiance: Brothers' Circle
- Convictions: Spain: money laundering, racketeering Georgia: money laundering, kidnapping, drug trafficking (in absentia) (Released)
- Penalty: 7.5 years in prison, €20 million fine (increased to 9 years and €22.5 million)

Zakhariy Knyazevich Kalashov (born 20 March 1953; Georgian: ზაქარია 'შაქრო' კალაშოვი, Russian: Заха́рий Кня́зевич Калашо́в), nicknamed "Young Shakro" (Шакро Молодой, Shakro Molodoy), is a Georgian born, Russian mafia boss, notorious gangster and thief in law of Yazidi origin. He is widely believed to be one of the most prominent figures in the Russian underworld.

== Biography ==
According to the United States federal government, Kalashov is a "key member" of the criminal syndicate known as "the Brothers' Circle." In June 2005, Spanish authorities launched "Operation Wasp" targeting 30 members of the Brothers' Circle, resulting in the seizure of 800 bank accounts, luxury villas and cars. Kalashov fled to the United Arab Emirates, where he was arrested in 2006. He is the most senior member of the Russian mafia to have been arrested outside of Russia. He was subsequently extradited to Spain and found guilty of money laundering and racketeering in 2009. In June 2010, he was sentenced to seven-and-a-half years in prison and fined €20 million. In 2011, his sentence was increased to nine years in prison and fine increased to €22.5 million.

In September 2010, a Spanish court approved the extradition of Kalashov back to Georgia, where he had been found guilty in absentia of kidnapping and other crimes and sentenced to 18 years in prison. He was allowed to appeal his extradition to the Spanish Supreme Court. On 27 October 2014, the Spanish court ruled that he would be expelled to Russia but not extradited to Georgia. It was unclear why the court sent him to Russia, where he also has citizenship, instead of extraditing him to Georgia to serve his sentence. He returned to Moscow on 29 October 2014, where he reportedly met with the Criminal Investigation Department of the Russian Ministry of Internal Affairs for a "preventative" meeting before being released.

== See also ==
- Yazidis in Georgia
