= Serbian mafia =

Various criminal organizations

- Cpпска мафија
- Founded: 1970s
- Founding location: Yugoslavia
- Years active: Since the late 20th century
- Territory: Europe, Australia, North America, South America and Africa
- Ethnicity: Serbs
- Activities: Drug trafficking, arms trafficking, human trafficking, assault, robbery, bribery, burglary, extortion, fraud, illegal gambling, kidnapping, illegal prostitution, money laundering, murder, racketeering, loan sharking, smuggling, theft
- Allies: Albanian mafia; American Mafia; Camorra; Bulgarian mafia; Corsican mafia; Dutch organized crime; Greek mafia; Gulf Cartel; Irish mob; Israeli mafia; Medellín Cartel; Montenegrin mafia; Moroccan mafia; 'Ndrangheta; Macedonian mafia; Romanian mafia; Russian mafia; Sacra Corona Unita; Sicilian Mafia; Sinaloa Cartel; South American drug cartels
- Notable members: List of members

The Serbian mafia (Serbian: Српска мафија, Srpska mafija), or Serbian organized crime, are various criminal organizations based in Serbia or composed of ethnic Serbs in the former Yugoslavia and Serbian diaspora. The organizations are primarily involved in smuggling, arms trafficking, drug trafficking, human trafficking, assassinations, heists, assault, protection rackets, murder, money laundering, and illegal gambling. Ethnic Serb organized crime groups are organized horizontally; higher-ranked members are not necessarily coordinated by any leader.

Serbian organized crime emerged during the 1970s as increasing numbers of Yugoslav expatriates emigrated to Western Europe. Serbian gangsters in Germany, Italy, the Netherlands, and France carried out robberies and heists with the support of the Yugoslavian security services, which employed expatriate criminals as informants and assassins, and in exchange provided them with weapons and legal protection. Such government support, along with the wealth Serbian gangs accumulated through a pattern of robberies, allowed the Serbian mafia to become one of the most powerful crime groups in Europe by the 1980s.

Following the breakup of Yugoslavia, many Serbian gangsters throughout Europe returned to Serbia to exploit new criminal opportunities and serve in paramilitary units during the Bosnian War. The Serbian mafia gave many Serbs a perceived way out of the economic disaster that occurred in the country following the implementation of internationally imposed sanctions against Serbia during the Yugoslav Wars of the 1990s. Serbian criminals have also been recruited into state security forces, a notable example being Milorad "Legija" Ulemek, a commander in Arkan's Tigers, which was re-labelled as the JSO (Red Berets) after the war.

During the period when the cigarette mafia operated, the Serbian mafia earned about 100 billion dollars. The annual earnings of the Serbian mafia in the cocaine market are estimated at $80 billion. The Serbian mafia is composed of several major international criminal organizations specializing in the cocaine trade, which in turn have wider networks throughout Europe and across the world. These include some highly successful groups, including one of the largest cocaine import enterprises in Europe, "Group America", and the "Pink Panthers", responsible for some of the biggest heists ever committed. The Serbian mafia has established a direct connection with the majority of cocaine producers, purchasing drugs directly from South American producers, selling them only to wholesalers operating in Europe.

According to estimates by Europol and the United States Drug Enforcement Administration (DEA), the Serbian cartel "Group America", also known "el cartel de las Balcanes" ("the cartel of the Balkans"), imports about 500 tons of cocaine annually to Europe. The boss of the group, Dejan Stanimirovic, was wanted by more than 30 countries. In June 2013, Forbes magazine published a list of the richest mafia bosses in the world, with Serbian drug lord Darko Šarić in fifth place with an estimated 27 billion dollars' worth of assets.

== History ==
=== 1970s and 1980s ===
The 1960s saw the emergence of the "Balkan Express" heroin smuggling network that transported heroin from the "Golden Crescent" nations of Afghanistan, Iran, and Pakistan to Western Europe via Turkey and the Balkans. The "Balkan Express" cut across all of the lines imposed by the Cold War as the network crossed from Turkey (a NATO member) into either Bulgaria (a member of the Warsaw Pact) or Greece (also a NATO member) into Yugoslavia (neutral in the Cold War) and ended either in Italy (a NATO member) or Austria (also neutral in the Cold War). Yugoslavia was a key point in the "Balkan Express" and several Serbian criminal clans played an important role in the "Balkan Express". By the 1970s-1980s, the Serbian mafia was making about $7 billion US per annum from smuggling heroin into Western Europe, which made the Serbian mafia into one of the most powerful organised crime groups in Europe, whose activities were tolerated by the Yugoslav authorities in exchange for a cut of the profits. For all these reasons, organised crime came to play an institutionalised role in Communist Yugoslavia analogous to the role played by the Mafia in Sicily, and it was quite common for state officials to have close ties with gangsters. During this period, the Serbian Mafia, as the various clans took to referring to themselves, forged an alliance with the Sicilian Mafia who purchased the heroin from the Serb clans and smuggled the heroin onward to the United States and other nations in the New World. Yugoslavia was especially attractive for drug smuggling for a number of reasons. Yugoslavia was neutral in the Cold War and was courted by both the Eastern and Western blocs of states, which allowed Yugoslavia to strike favorable deals with both sides. Marshal Josip Broz Tito was one of the leaders of the Non-Aligned bloc of nations, and it was very common for university students from non-aligned Third World nations to study for their degrees in Yugoslavia, which ensured that many Yugoslavs knew people from the Third World first-hand. Furthermore, Yugoslavia was not a closed country, and millions of tourists came from abroad every year to enjoy the sunny Adriatic coast while Yugoslavs were allowed visa-free travel to the West. Starting in the 1960s, Yugoslavs were permitted to go to Western Europe, mostly West Germany, the Netherlands and Sweden, to work as "guest workers". By 1971, about 4% of the Yugoslav population had left to work in Western Europe as "guest workers" whose remittances to their families back in Yugoslavia became an important source of income.

Ljubomir Magaš, aka Ljuba Zemunac, was known as the "Godfather" of the Serbian mafia during the 1970s and 1980s. He and his gang operated in Germany and Italy during this time. He was assassinated in 1986 by his rival Goran "Majmun" Vuković. Vukasin Despotović & Dario Ivišić operated in the Netherlands and became one of the most powerful gangsters through his elimination of rivals while working as a hitman and took over the drug trade in the Netherlands. The drug that was smuggled was cocaine from Colombia and "Joca Amsterdam" became known as the "Cocaine King". He worked for "Duja" Bećirović as an underboss and later lived in Bulgaria where he successfully smuggled drugs until his arrest in 2002. Upon returning to Serbia, he took over companies by force, utilizing the Surčin clan, (one of three then most powerful "clans" of Belgrade). He was later accused of organizing the 2008 assassination of Ivo Pukanić, a Croatian journalist killed by a car bomb, but was acquitted by a Serbian court due to a lack of evidence for his involvement.

Željko "Arkan" Ražnatović was a successful bank robber in Western Europe in the 1970s. He had convictions and warrants in Belgium, the Netherlands, Sweden, Germany, Austria, Switzerland, and Italy. However, he managed to escape from several prisons and then made connections with several known criminals from Yugoslavia during his time there. In the 1980s he returned to Serbia where he became involved with illegal businesses and led the Red Star Belgrade supporters' group "Delije Sever" ("Ultras").

=== 1990s ===
The real breakthrough for criminal organizations in Serbia occurred in the early 1990s, when the Yugoslav Wars erupted in first Croatia and then Bosnia. The Serbs, Croats, and Bosniaks fought over territory in Croatia and Bosnia and Herzegovina. International sanctions were imposed on Serbia starting in May 1992 and Serbia became economically isolated. This prompted the breakthrough for criminal organizations. Desperate for money, many former soldiers and youngsters turned to a life of crime.

In 1992, members of the "Peca" gang were arrested in a massive police-operation. One of the gang's members was Dušan Spasojević, who later became the head of the Zemun clan. A young mobster from the Belgrade suburb of Voždovac, Aleksandar "Knele" Knežević, was murdered in October of that year, prompting a brief, but violent Gang War in Belgrade.

Arkan was the founder and leader of the Serb Volunteer Guard (Arkan's Tigers), a Serb paramilitary unit that fought during the Yugoslav Wars. The unit's members were mostly newly recruited Red Star Belgrade hooligans and gangsters from Serbia. Those who joined the unit profited on the battlefields by looting and stealing. Arkan later founded the Party of Serbian Unity in 1993. By the time he returned home, he had become the most powerful member of the Serbian Mafia. He married singer Svetlana "Ceca" Ražnatović.

Since the days of SFRY, the mafia has sometimes been protected in exchange for political favors, thus having a direct connection to their activities. Stane Dolanc, a Slovene, instrumentalized the mafia for political assassinations abroad. In the 90s, the Mafia profited by smuggling cigarettes, alcohol, and oil. Businessman Stanko Subotić was the person that made the largest profit at this time, as cigarettes and oil were in such high demand because of the sanctions. Subotić's net worth is estimated to be €650 million. After Milošević's fall from power, Subotić maintained connections with Montenegrin President Milo Đukanović, who granted him political favours.

From 1994 to 2000, illegal cigarette smuggling in Italy was operated by the Serbian mafia in coordination with the Italian organized crime groups. Serb and Montenegrin soldiers who had returned from the front-lines of the Yugoslav wars found the only way to make a profit was by turning to a life of crime. The most common crimes were assassinations, kidnappings, drug and cigarette trafficking, robberies, money laundering, racketeering, and illegal software production. In 1998, 350 kilograms of heroin were seized at the Serbian-Bulgarian border.

=== 2000s ===
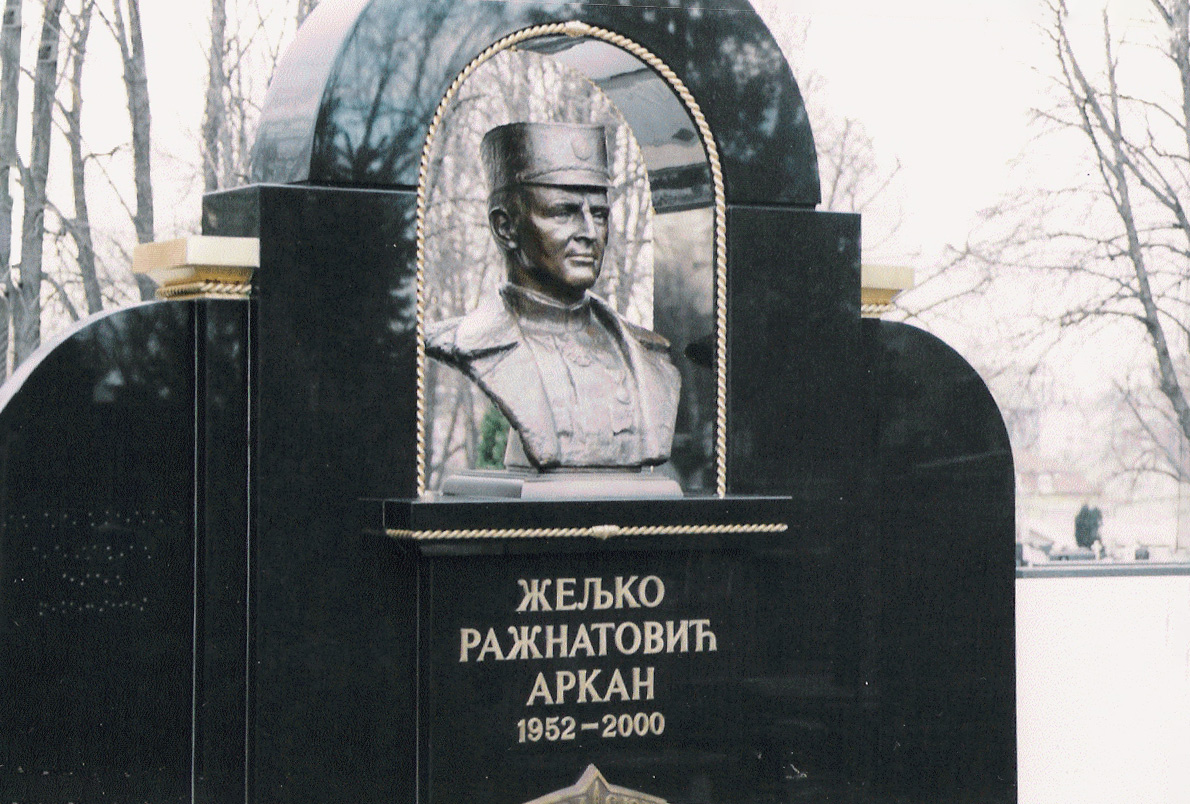
Arkan's tomb

On 15 January 2000, Arkan was assassinated in the lobby of the InterContinental Hotel in Belgrade. Slobodan Milošević was dethroned in the October 2000 Bulldozer Revolution. However, a bloody feud soon emerged among the different criminal "clans" of Belgrade. The feud grew into an open war in which many of the key Mafia bosses were assassinated. In 2000, some €841,000,000 was made in illegal profits in Serbia.

By the early 2000s, the Serbian mafia reportedly had more money than the Serbian government and was better armed than the Serbian Army and Serbian police, according to Serbian Interior Minister Dušan Mihajlović, who claimed Slobodan Milošević had given life to crime-syndicates as a "state-sanctioned mafia". Prostitutes from Russia, Belarus, and Ukraine were smuggled into Serbia. After Milošević fell from power, the Mafia began seeking a new contact in the government. In September 2001, 700 kilograms of heroin was found in a bank vault rented by the BIA in central Belgrade. The illegal safekeeping was never explained, nor brought up. In exchange for information about Kosovo Albanian insurgents, the Zemun Gang was provided "special training courses" by the Serbian Special Forces.

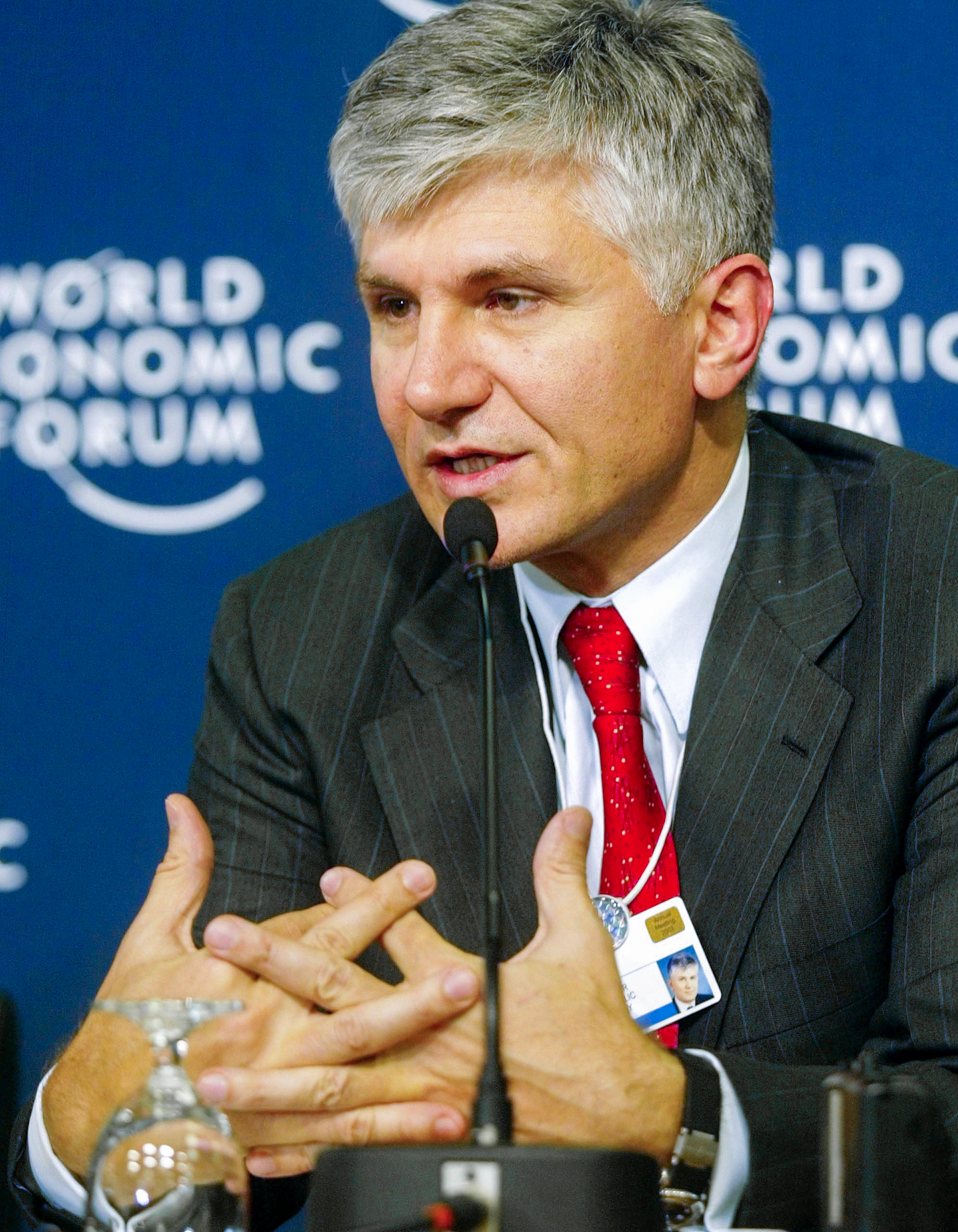
Prime Minister Zoran Đinđić was assassinated on 12 March 2003, by members of the Special Operations Unit (Red Berets).

Beginning with the Yugoslav wars and ending with the assassination of Prime Minister Zoran Đinđić in March 2003, connections between the mafia and the government were obvious and corruption was rampant in most branches of the government, from border patrols to law-enforcement agencies. On 12 March 2003, Đinđić was assassinated by a former Serbian Special Operations Unit member, Zvezdan Jovanović. "Legija" was also involved in the assassination and was sentenced to 50 years in prison.

Đinđić had connections within the Surčin Gang that dated back to the earlier overthrowing of Milošević. The government set in motion an operation against organized crime - "Operation Sabre", which led to more than 10,000 arrests. Many New Belgrade malls, locations frequented by gangsters, were closed after the Operation, 123 criminal groups were shattered with 844 members awaiting trial; 3,949 people had criminal complaints issued against them. 28 kilograms of heroin, 463 grams of cocaine, 44,837 kilograms of marijuana, 4,960 kilograms of synthetic drugs and 688 stolen cars were recovered in a single day. Milan Sarajlić, the Deputy State Prosecutor of Serbia was arrested that day and later confessed to being on the payroll of the Zemun clan.

In November 2003, 140 kilograms of marijuana were seized in Belgrade and 4 people were arrested. The Red Berets were dissolved on 23 March 2003. In 2005, it was confirmed that Serbia had lost 7,500,000 RSD daily due to economic crime, with the estimated total loss to criminal activity being estimated to be approximately €200,000,000 yearly. In 2006, it was revealed that Dušan Spasojević, leader of the Zemun clan, was connected to Serbian Radical leader Vojislav Šešelj, to whom he had allegedly given information about high-profile murders carried out in Serbia, which Šešelj wrote about.

In January 2009, Serbian Interior Minister Ivica Dačić estimated that between 30 and 40 serious organized crime groups were operating in Serbia. The figures provided by Dačić did not include smaller criminal groups but more organized ones that were involved in drug and arms trafficking, human trafficking, murder and protection rackets.

In September 2009, 22 members of the Elez group were arrested by the Serbian police, dubbed the most dangerous gang in Western Balkans. The leader, Darko Elez, was captured with five other members in Serbia. 13 others were captured in Bosnia, including three police officers. Police seized 2.8 tons (2,800 kg, worth 120 million €) of cocaine shipment from Uruguay on 17 October 2009, the BIA and American DEA made the joint operation. On 31 October 2009, Serbian police arrested over 500 people in the biggest anti-drug bust ever in Serbia.

The Interior Ministry organized the Morava-operation that would focus on drug trafficking to young people in the primary and secondary schools, clubs and cafes and would encompass 2,000 police officers searching the whole country.

In November 2009, Argentine police arrested five Serbian drug couriers and seized their 492 kilograms of cocaine in Buenos Aires, One of the largest drug busts in 2009. The routes of the drugs were from Uruguay and Argentina via Central alt. South Africa to Northern Italy alt. Turkey to Montenegro. Serbian organized crime experts estimated 10,000 foot soldiers part of 5 major organized crime groups operating in Serbia. A courier package of 5 kilos cocaine was intercepted from Paraguay, 4 Serbs from Belgrade were arrested. The busts were part of the Operation Balkan Warrior; an international drug smuggling case that involves mainly the Zemun clan, led by, among others, Željko Vujanović.

In December 2009, Interior Minister Ivica Dačić said "half of the Serbian sport clubs are led by people with links to organized crime". 21 kilos of heroin ($1,5-million) were found in a Belgrade flat rented by a Montenegrin national. The drugs were brought from Turkey.

=== 2010s ===
In January 2010, a 20-acre (81,000 m^{2}) lot illegally owned by the Zemun clan was seized at Šilerova Street, Zemun, Belgrade, the clan's headquarters. By 21 January, the Balkan Warrior Operation included 19 suspects, 9 of whom were already in custody. New arrestees included Darko Šarić and Goran Soković. That same day, an 8-man crime group involved in stealing of oil over a two-year period from the NIS pipelines, the crude oil was sold through a company, worth several hundred thousands of euros, among the arrested is a member of the MUP.

On 10 February 2010, Serbian top officials said serious death threats from the narco-mafia have been directed against President Boris Tadić, Deputy Prime minister and Interior minister Ivica Dačić, Special prosecutor for organized crime Miljko Radisavljević, and other top government officials. On 18 February, a group of six robbers from Belgrade were arrested, they had since 2008 stolen more than 10 million RSD from banks, post offices, gas stations, exchange offices and stores.

On 19 February 2010, Interior Minister Dačić said more than 50 suspects were arrested today in an ongoing operation aimed against financial crime and money laundering conducted in Valjevo, Novi Sad, Belgrade, Šabac, Sremska Mitrovica, Čačak and Sombor.

In March 2010, Stanko "Cane" Subotić, head of the so-called "Tobacco mafia", accused Nebojša Medojević, the Montenegrin party leader of Movement for Change of having organized a manhunt for him. Medojević had claimed that Cane and Darko Šarić had been hiding in a Montenegrin police villa in Žabljak, while Cane said in an interview that he was in Geneva, Switzerland.

On 19 March, Boris Tadić vowed all-out war on the Serbian mafia, in particular drug trafficking that is considered the biggest threat in society. He claimed to have evidence that Serbian cartels have attempted to penetrate state institutions to destabilise the government. "The latest property seizures prove that those groups have laundered narco money by investing not only into their personal houses and land but also in tourism, factories and distribution of the press", Tadić said. On 28 March 2010, two Bosniaks from Novi Pazar, Sandžak were arrested at Zagreb Airport with at least 1.7 kilograms of cocaine for the Serbian drug market. The pure cocaine came from Lima, Peru where they had spent the month traveling from Belgrade. The drugs were worth an estimated €70,000 on the streets of Croatia.

In April 2010, it was concluded that Šarić's gang had planned an operation against Serbian officials, including the president. Encrypted messages in local newspapers were deciphered by investigators and after long surveillance of the clan it was concluded that several hitmen were to kill Serbian officials of the MUP, BIA and state officials in a synchronized and highly well-coordinated way. The Šarić clan wants to liquidate people that are in their way, after the Balkan Warrior Operation that heavily decreased crime in Serbia and Montenegro. On 14 May 2010, three Serbs who worked security for one of Bolivia's top drug lords were killed in a shootout with rival crime groups; the drug lord was kidnapped.

Dačić submitted the work report for 2009; the police had uncovered 7 OC groups and arrested 86 people. He said that by the end of 2009 there were 27 registered OC groups active, with each group having more than 200 members. There is/was an ongoing investigation against Zemun clan members involved in assassinations who claim Šešelj ordered the assassination of Tomislav Nikolić.

In 2010 it was revealed that the Šarić gang had, from 2008 to 2009, ousted the 'Ndrangheta from the drug market. With the emergence of the gang on Italian soil, the gang offered better quality cocaine for a lower price, effectively gaining the market from 2007 to 2009, trafficking cocaine from South America. Operation Balkan Warrior was successful in Italy, with over 80 people arrested. Two networks were among the arrested, one Italian, with members from Milan and other northern Italian towns, and the other, a Serbian network, with members from Serbia, Montenegro and Slovenia. The Serbian network has operatives all over Europe and South America.

The Principi group is a criminal organization in Serbia that is most closely linked to the Serbian state. After the arrest of their leader and suspected multiple murderer Veljko Belivuk in 2019, he said in a court hearing that he had done "dirty work" for the Serbian government. In 2022, criminal proceedings against the alleged mafia boss Veljko Belivuk and 31 co-defendants began in a court in Belgrade. The leader is charged with five counts of murder, kidnapping, drug trafficking and illegal possession of weapons. He said he worked through intermediaries for President Aleksandar Vučić.

In 2011, Dr Gilly McKenzie, an Interpol Organized Crime Unit expert, compiled a "White Book" containing 52 criminal organizations in Serbia. None of which had been terminated by the year's end. In the same year, it was concluded that the protection rackets in port cities on the Black Sea were run by Serbian, Russian and Ukrainian criminals.

== Groups ==
=== Belgrade neighbourhoods ===
- (1992–present) Novi Beograd gangs, organized in different Blokovi (neighbourhoods), during the 1990s the gangsters of New Belgrade were very successful but had after the Yugoslav wars been killed by each other. They still operate in smaller groups.
- (1989-1999) Surčin clan, at the beginning car thefts, smuggling of petrol and cigarettes, moved on to narcotics. Had connections with officials in police, judiciary and politicians mostly prior to the Operation Sablja.
- (1998-2013) Zemun clan, Drug trafficking, contract-killing, abduction. Had connections with officials in police, judiciary and politicians mostly prior to the Operation Sablja. The head was Dušan Spasojević.
  - (2013-2020) Šarić gang
- (1994-2003) Dorćol group, drug trafficking
- (1996–present) Karaburma "Anti-Romi" group, drug trafficking, racketeering, organised crime, causing a public disturbance, public enemies
- (199?-2004) Senjak group, known for drug trafficking, racketeering
- (2013–present) Principi group, known for football hooliganism, drug trafficking, protection racketeering and contract killing, led by Veljko Belivuk and Marko Miljković.

=== Group America ===
Group America (Serbian: Група Америка; Grupa Amerika), also known as "el cartel de los Balcanes" ("the cartel of the Balkans"), is a Serbian mafia group and international drug cartel. Group America has roots in New York and Belgrade; operating on a global scale in dozens of countries, this criminal organization is considered to be one of the most pervasive, violent and powerful drug gangs in Europe.

The group originated in the 1970s, when Serbian nationalist Boško "The Yugo" Radonjić emigrated from Yugoslavia to the United States and joined the Westies, a predominantly Irish-American organized crime gang operating in the Hell's Kitchen neighborhood of Manhattan in New York. After the imprisonment of Jimmy Coonan and other Westies leaders in the late 1980s, Radonjić assumed control of the gang and recruited other Serb mobsters, including Mileta Miljanić and Zoran Jakšić, into the organization. He also maintained links with the Gambino crime family and its boss, John Gotti. Miljanić, a Bosnian Serb from Gacko, and Jakšić, an immigrant from Zrenjanin, served as bodyguards for Radonjić before they were each sentenced to federal prison for credit card fraud in the late 1980s. Miljanić was paroled after serving 20 months of a three-year sentence, while Jakšić was also paroled after serving part of a five-year sentence, but was returned to prison for a parole violation.

Amidst the breakup of Yugoslavia and outbreak of the Yugoslav Wars in the early 1990s, Radonjić and other gang members returned to Belgrade, where they allegedly established links with the Serbian security services. Radonjić gradually relinquished control of the group, and he was eventually succeeded by Vojislav "Voya the American" Raičević, who oversaw the organization's transformation into an international crime syndicate focusing on trafficking cocaine from South America to Europe which came to be known as "Group America".

In 1997, Raičević disappeared, presumed killed by a rival gang. His brother, Veselin Vesko “Little Bear” Raičević, convened a meeting to formulate a campaign to uncover the identity of Raičević's killers and exact revenge. Among the attendees of the meeting was Boško Bojović, a senior Montenegrin spy loyal to Slobodan Milošević. The man determined to be Raičević's assassin, Miša Cvjetičanin, was tortured until he revealed the identity of his co-conspirators and then dismembered with a chainsaw. A string of murders then followed, including of two rival gang leaders, a police general, two Group America turncoats, and one of their fathers. Following the purge, Miljanić emerged as the leader of Group America.

The Bosnian drug cartel, led by, Edin Gačanin known by the nickname Tito, considered to be one of the world's most prolific drug traffickers, security services, however, believe that Edin Gačanin (Tito) is the person who, after Jakšić's arrest, took over the work in the field in his name and the Group America account.

The center of Jakšić's business and other Serbian cartels in South America was Bolivia until 2014. That year, due to large confiscation operations, the business center was transferred to Peru, since then Peru has been the main distribution center of cocaine to Europe. Peru held by Jakšić until 2016, he had the strongest contacts with the cartels there, and no one was stronger than him. When Zoran Jakšić was arrested in 2016, the work continued. Jakšić did not lose his power with the arrest, only one of his associates took over the work on the field. According to our information, the person who took control of the drug business in Peru is the same person identified by the local police under the nickname Tito," a source from the security services told.

According to a Brazilian federal police detective Ivo Silva, Group America, also known as "Balkan Cartel" is the most powerful criminal organization operating in Brazil. Goran Nešić was one of the most powerful drug lords in South America, he is considered to be a member of Group America. He held 2 football clubs one of which was in the champions League. Sainidis lived in a fortified villa like in the movie "Scarface", which the Brazilians called "Fortress". It is surrounded by a metal fence through which electricity has been passed. Numerous cameras and armed guards guard her owner, who has a hundreds of subjects: bodyguards, couriers, drug dealers. Sainidis was completely calm during his arrest, as the Brazilian media reporter - in the style of a big boss in a luksury summer house in Bauru, he was arrested in a completely casual.

=== YACS ===
YACS (an abbreviation of "Yugoslavians, Albanians, Croatians and Serbians") is a term used by the United States Federal Bureau of Investigation (FBI) to describe a loose-knit network of criminals from the former Yugoslavia based in the Bronx and southern Westchester County areas of New York. Captain George Duke of the New York City Police Department (NYPD) characterized the YACS group as consisting of two distinct divisions; a Serbian faction which focused on gem heists, and an Albanian group which carried out robberies on targets such as grocery stores and gas stations. Describing the gang's modus operandi, FBI Agent John J. Slicks said: "They are not structured like the Cosa Nostra. It's not like they have one leader, or a top-down structure. They are ad hoc groups. They will mix and match people for different jobs". The YACS group has also been recruited as an "enforcement arm" for American Mafia crime families. According to Captain George E. Rutledge of the Yonkers Police Department: "The YACS are valuable to traditional Italian families because they are very ingrained in European values. They don't talk to police".

The network began operating as early as 1988. Between 1992 and 1998, the YACS group robbed an estimated 150 automated teller machines, and from 1994 to 1998, burgled 410 supermarkets in 23 U.S. states. Jewelry stores and other businesses were also targeted. The gang accumulated approximately $50 million from these robberies. According to the FBI, some of the stolen funds were used by the group to finance paramilitary operations in the Balkans.

Hundreds of attempted or successful burglaries had been attributed to the YACS group by the Food Marketing Institute (FMI) by 1994, leading the FMI to seek assistance from the FBI in preventing the crime trend. An investigation into the YACS crime ring was then initiated by the New York office of the FBI. By 1998, the investigation had resulted in almost 300 suspected members being identified and as many as a hundred being arrested.

As part of a Labor Day initiative by the FBI, YACS burglars and robbers were arrested in Branford, Connecticut; Montgomery Township, Pennsylvania; North Reading, Massachusetts; and Los Gatos, California, in September 1995.

In December 1995, five YACS burglars were apprehended by police in Saratoga Springs, New York.

Two YACS gang members, Zenun Kameraj and Bktesh Beka, were arrested while carrying out a burglary at a grocery store in Yorktown, New York in April 1996. The duo were convicted of burglary; Kameraj was sentenced to two-to-four years in state prison, and Beka was sentenced to one and a half-to-four and a half years in state prison.

Thirteen alleged members of the YACS network were indicted in Manhattan Federal Court on 25 April 1996, on charges of conspiracy to commit interstate theft, robbery and bank burglary. The group was accused of planning or attempting to commit at least 21 robberies and burglaries in New York, Illinois and New Jersey.

On 30 May 1996, ten people allegedly affiliated with the YACS group were indicted in White Plains Federal Court, charged with robbery, burglary, narcotics distribution and racketeering. The gang allegedly carried out 16 burglaries on residences, banks, supermarkets and gas stations in New York, New Jersey, Pennsylvania and Illinois.

Two suspected members of the YACS gang, Saša Vučetović and Gary Bohanan, were arrested following a $36,000 armed robbery of a Chase Manhattan Bank in Ardsley, New York on 23 June 1998. Vučetović and Bohanan were both charged with first-degree robbery.

On 14 August 1998, three suspected YACS members, Shani Gashi, Michael Ruiz and John DeAngelo, were arrested in Yorktown while opening a safe which had been stolen from a convenience store in Hunter, New York. The trio were indicted for possession of stolen property and possession of burglar's tools.

Three YACS members, Nikolin Camaj, Nikolin Prelaj and Mervan Rugovac, were apprehended after tripping a silent alarm while burglarizing a market in Schodack, New York on 10 August 1999. Each of the men were convicted of burglary and sentenced to state prison terms; Camaj to seven years, and Prelaj and Rugovac to four years.

The YACS group was suspected in a string of burglaries carried out in Orange County, New York between June 2002 and February 2003.

=== Other ===
- Peca gang (19??-1992)
- Arkan network († 2000)
- Elez group (-2009)
- Keka group
- Belov clan
- Serbian Brotherhood
- Pink Panthers gang

== Notable Serbian gang leaders and members ==
The reign of Slobodan Milošević represented the height of power of Serbian organized crime, when mafiosi and government officials were intertwined. The role of several Belgrade gangsters was described in the documentary film, Vidimo se u čitulji (See You in the Obituary).

Name Alias	Born/died	Title	Info	Affiliation
Mafiosi
Stevan "Stevica" Marković	1937–1968	Gangster	French actor Alain Delon's bodyguard, Marković's body was found in a garbage dump in the Paris suburbs in October 1968. His death occasioned an attempt to destabilize the French state, with accusations leveled against Pompidou.	Own gang
Novica "Stiv" Jovanović	1954–1984	Gangster	Known as a gentleman robber, he and Bruno Sulak were the most wanted men of the 1980s in France and other parts of Europe due to a series of spectacular robberies in Cannes, Nice, Monaco, Paris and Lyon. Killed in an ambush by a special unit of the French police, while trying to get Sulak out of prison. The duo were the forerunner of today's Pink Panther group.	Own gang
Ranko "Dač Šulc" Rubežić	1951–1985	Boss	Murdered in February 1985 by four of his own associates: Miroslav "Vuja" Vujisić, Dragan "Dadilja" Popović, Boris Petkov, and Bojan Petrović.	
Ljubomir Magaš aka Ljuba Zemunac	1948–1986	Godfather; Head Boss	A Yugoslav amateur boxer, street-fighter and gangster. During the 1970s/80s he operated his own gang in Germany and was assassinated in 1986 by a rival, Goran Vuković.	Own gang
Branislav "Beli" Matić	1952–1991	Boss	A close friend of Giška, who was a successful businessman in the Netherlands. He co-founded and financed of the Serbian Guard. He was killed outside his family home on 4 August 1991.	Giška
Đorđe "Giška" Božović	1955–1991	Boss	Killed in action during Battle of Gospić (present-day Republic of Croatia) on 15 September 1991, by Croatian forces.	Ljuba Zemunac
Aleksandar "Knele" Knežević	1971–1992	Lieutenant	The youngest "star" of the Serbian mafia at the beginning of the 1990s, he was a bodyguard to Serbian politician Vuk Drašković. Knežević was murdered on 28 October 1992 in his room at the Hyatt Hotel in Belgrade.	Voždovac; Giška
Georg "Žorž" Stanković	1946–1993	Boss	A mob boss of the older generation; murdered on 1 October 1993 by a single hitman.	
Goran "Majmun" Vuković	1959–1994	Boss	Vuković murdered Ljuba Zemunac outside court in 1986. Vuković was assassinated alongside Dušan Malović in downtown Belgrade on 12 December 1994	Voždovac
Mihajlo Divac	1967–1995	Boss	Leader of the Novi Beograd gang at time, he had previously survived a number of murder attempts. In one attempt executor was Luka Bojović. Divac was shot dead in the hall of the Putnik Hotel, Belgrade, in February 1995.	Novi Beograd
Božidar "Batica" Stanković	1969–1996		Son of Georg Stanković, he was assassinated on 23 June 1996 by a hitman.	
Zoran "Žuća" Dimitrov	1966–1996		Had previously survived a number of assassination attempts, but was finally killed on 6 October 1996 by a hitman.	Voždovac
Rade "Ćenta" Ćaldović	1950–1997	Boss	The infamous Belgrade mafioso, was murdered on 14 February 1997 in his car in Belgrade by two assassins. His two brothers were also connected with the Serbian mafia, Dragan ("Ćatana") Ćaldović, and Momčilo ("Moške") Ćaldović.	
Darko Ašanin	1959–1998		A Belgrade gangster involved with drugs and killings. His uncle was Pavle Bulatović, the late Defense Minister. Murdered on 30 June 1998, in his cafe "Koloseum" in Dedinje district of Belgrade by a sole hitman.	
Zoran Šijan	1964–1999	Boss	Former European kickboxing champion and purported leader of the Surčin gang was killed on 27 November 1999 at the corner of Nemanja and Svetozar Marković streets in Belgrade. He was the husband of Serbian Turbo-folk singer Goca Božinovska.	Own gang Surčin clan
Branislav "Dugi" Lainović	1955–2000	Boss	Founder of the Serbian Volunteer Guard with Giška	
Arkan	1952–2000	Head Boss	Considered the most powerful criminal in Serbia until his assassination on 15 January 2000. He was murdered by Dobroslav Gavrić (a close friend of Bata Trlaja), a former policeman who was part of the Novi Beograd gang.	Own network
Radoslav "Bata Trlaja" Trlajić	1963–2000		Belgrade mob boss and member of the Novi Beograd gang, he was famous for referring to Serbia and Belgrade in the 1990s as "a pond too small for so many crocodiles". He was killed on 26 February 2000 by Mile Luković of the Zemun gang.	Novi Beograd network
Zoran "Ćanda" Davidović	1972–2000		Murdered by the Zemun clan while returning from the funeral of Branislav Lainović on 23 March 2000.	
Milivoje "Miša Kobra" Matović	1955–2003	Head Boss	Milivoje Matović (aka "Miša Kobra") arrived in Sydney, Australia in 1986, and became a known gambler who organized big games. His younger brother Braca owed money to the gang of Žorž Stanković, who sent his son Batica for Miša Kobra. Batica Stanković was deported to Serbia, and Braca was killed in the meantime. Žorž was killed in 1993 and his son Batica was killed in 1996.	Sydney clan
Dušan Spasojević, known as "Šiptar" and "Duća"	1968–2003	Head	Head of one of the largest Serb criminal groups on record, the Zemun clan. The peak of this cartel's influence occurred from 2000 until 2003 when Spasojević was killed by Serbian police on 27 March 2003 during a country-wide manhunt initiated after the assassination of Serbian Prime Minister Zoran Đinđić.	Zemun clan
Milan "Kum" Luković	1969–2003	Head	Head of one of the largest Serbian criminal groups on record, the Zemun clan. The peak of this cartel's influence occurred from 2000 until 2003 when Luković was killed by Serbian police on 27 March 2003 during a country-wide manhunt initiated after the assassination of Serbian Prime Minister Zoran Đinđić	Zemun clan
Bosko "The Yugo" Radonjich	1943–2011	Godfather	American godfather. Died at the VMA on 31 May 2011.	Irish American "Westies"
Rade Rakonjac	1962–2014	Lieutenant	Former bodyguard to Željko Raznatović (Arkan) and Luka Bojović. Killed in a cafe in the Belgrade.	Arkan
Ibrahim Habibovic (also known as "Beli" and "Drago lo Belo")	1957-	Head Boss	Member of the Belos and Milano clans	
Stanko "Cane" Subotić	1959-	Boss	Head of the Tobacco mafia that smuggled cigarettes throughout Europe, allegedly connected with Serbian and Montenegrin officials.	Tobacco mafia
Sreten "Joca Amsterdam" Jocić (aka "Cocaine King")	1962-	Boss; Underboss	One of the most known mafiosi, became strongest in Netherlands through his elimination of rivals. He smuggled cocaine from Colombia. He worked under "Duja" Becirovic as underboss in the Belgrade group and became boss after Duja died in 1990 after Bruinsma hired the kill. A drug smuggler in Bulgaria, he was arrested in 2002. In Serbia, he took over companies with the Surčin clan. Jocić was allegedly involved in the 2008 car bomb which killed journalist Ivo Pukanić in Zagreb.	Belgrade group
Milorad "Legija" Ulemek	1968-	Boss	Arkan's Tigers member during the Yugoslav wars, transferred into the Red berets by Milošević. Involved in the murder of Prime Minister Zoran Đinđić and sentenced to 40 years in prison as the orderer of the murder.	Arkan; Zemun
Kristijan "Kiki" Golubović	1969-		One of the few surviving Belgrade criminals from the 1990s	Godson of Ljuba Zemunac
Darko Šarić	1970-	Head	Šarić was leader of powerful Balkan criminal organization which had for a years trafficking cocaine from South America through Balkan, Italy and Slovenia to Western Europe and had profited around billion euros each year. Company records show that most of money Šarić laundered by investing it in privatization of important hotels in Serbia and in buying companies from people who were charged or convinced for involvement in organized crime, mostly cigarette smuggling. Šarić received 30 million euros when he sold Serbia's leading distribution company ŠTAMPA SISTEM to the German media concern WAZZ.	Own gang Šarić's clan
Luka "Pekar" Bojović	1973-	Boss; Lieutenant	Arkan's Tigers member and Lieutenant during the Yugoslav wars	Arkan; Zemun clan
Vladimir "Budala" Milisavljević	1976-		Member of the Zemun clan. Arrested in 2012 with Luka Bojović in Valencia, Spain. In 2015, he was sentenced to 22 years in prison for possessing illegal weapons and covering up the murder of Milan Jurišić "Jure". Involved in the murder of Prime Minister Zoran Đinđić and sentenced to 35 years in prison.	Zemun clan
Miloš Simović	1979-	Assassin	Member of the Zemun clan. Arrested with Sretko Kalinić in Croatia in 2010. Involved in the murder of Prime Minister Zoran Đinđić and sentenced to 30 years in prison.	Zemun clan
Filip Korać	1980-	Boss	Member of the Zemun clan. Inherited the management of the Zemun clan from Luka Bojović in 2012. He fought on the side of the Škaljar clan, and against the Kavačka group. His biggest enemy in Serbia was a group led first by Aleksandar Stanković "Sale Mutavi", and then by Veljko Belivuk. Korać also fought with this group over supremacy over the stands at the Partizan stadium. In Croatia, Korać was given a suspended sentence in 2022 for forging a passport. He was arrested in October 2023 in Hungary on a French warrant for drug trafficking, and the evidence against him is the messages he exchanged through the Sky application. Bosnia and Herzegovina is also looking for Korać, which has also issued an international warrant for him for drug trafficking.	Zemun clan
Veljko "Velja Nevolja" Belivuk	1985-	Head	Belivuk was leader of FK Partizan's fans named Grobari. After the death of his close friend Aleksandar Stanković in 2016, he founded a criminal gang in collaboration with Kavač Clan from Montenegro. Belivuk and his clan were arrested in February 2021 on suspicion of having committed serious crimes including mass murdering, drug trafficking, kidnappings, racketeering and illegal possession of weapons. Belivuk and his clan are currently on trial in Belgrade.	Own gang Belivuk's clan
Marko "Mesar" Miljković	1991-	Head	Veljko Belivuk's closest associate and his right hand. Accused of organizing brutal liquidations of opponents. He is currently on trial in Belgrade along with other members of the gang.	Belivuk's clan
Assassinations & connected people
Klaas "De Lange" Bruinsma "De Lange"	1953–1991	Drug lord	A Dutch drug lord killed on 27 June 1991 by Martin Hoogland, a former policeman hired by Joca Amsterdam as a revenge for the killing of Joca's boss, a previous Belgrade group leader, known as Duja.	
Radojica Nikčević	1948–1993	Businessman	Businessman said to have had close ties with the State Security Service, but also with Arkan, who was killed on 7 October 1993. The front of his office in Dedinje. He was suspected of ties with the Medellin cartel.	FR Yugoslavia
Vojislav Stanimirović	1937-2022	Criminal turned journalist	The leader of the Balkan trio responsible for the 1971 Vizcaya heist. He immigrated to the United States in 1962 and had later ties to YACS and the Pink Panthers	
Radislava "Dada" Vujasinović	1964–1994	Journalist	Reporter for Duga, a news magazine. She was found dead in her apartment on 8 April 1994. The police ruled it a suicide, but many dispute this.	
Vlada "Tref" Kovačević	1958–1997	Businessman	Businessman and close friend of Marko Milošević, son of former Yugoslav President Slobodan Milošević; Kovačević was killed on 20 February 1997.	Marko Milošević
Maja Pavić	1972–1997	Journalist	Journalist of Pink Television. Killed with her boyfriend Rade Ćaldović on 14 February 1997 in his car in Belgrade by two assassins. She was victim of mafia.	Rade Ćaldović/Arkan
Radovan "Badža" Stojičić	1951–1997	Chief	Police chief assassinated by a sole hitman on 10 April 1997 in a Belgrade pizza parlour called "Mama Mia".	Police
Zoran "Kundak" Todorović	1959–1997	Businessman; Politician	The Secretary General of the Yugoslav Left was killed on 24 October 1997.	Mirjana Marković
Slavko Ćuruvija	1949–1999	Publisher, journalist	Owner of the Belgrade Daily Telegraph and the weekly European was killed on 11 April 1999. front of his apartment at Svetogorska Street #35 in downtown Belgrade during the NATO air strikes on Yugoslavia.	Mirjana Marković
Jill Dando	1961–1999	Journalist	English journalist, television presenter and newsreader who worked for the BBC for 14 years. She was murdered by gunshot outside her home in Fulham, London. Hitman was sent from Yugoslavia.	
Zoran "Skole" Uskoković	1963–2000	Businessman	a Belgrade businessman, was murdered on 27 April 2000 by members of the Zemun clan.	
Branislav "Dugi" Lainović	1955–2000	Businessman	Businessman from Novi Sad. Murdered in Belgrade on 21 March 2000 by Miloš Simović of the Zemun gang.	
Momir Gavrilović	1959–2001	Deputy Chief (retired)	was assassinated in 2001 by Milorad "Legija" Ulemek and the Zemun clan to damage premier Zoran Đinđić's administration by convincing the public that Gavrilović was killed for delivering "evidence" of government ties with the criminals. The DNA of Sretko Kalinić, number one hitman of the Zemun clan, was found at the murder site.	BIA
Smail Tarić	1981–2008		Murdered due to his connections with the police by two members of the Berane clan, Velibor Brkić and Milos Rašić.	
Danilo Radonjić	1948–2011	Businessman	One of many businessmen during the 1990s. The first assassination attempt on him was made back in 1985 when Andrija Lakonjić Laki tried to kill him in front of a Belgrade restaurant. He was assassinated on 6 September 2011, by a professional hitman.	
Boško Raičević	1971–2012	Businessman	He was a "relative and associate" of Andrija Drašković - who was put on trial and found guilty for the murder of a member of the Surčin crime group. He was killed by a car bomb.	
Radojica "Joksa" Joksović	1980–2012	Businessman	Radojica worked for a protected witness Nebojša Josković in proceedings against Darko Šarić. Joksović was killed by the blast that destroys his car.	
Nikola Bojović	1974–2013	Brother of Luka Bojović	He was the younger brother of one of the bosses of Zemun clan, Luka Bojović, who is under arrest in Spain. Nikola Bojović was murdered on 29 April 2013, by a professional hitman.	

== Activity outside Serbia ==
The Pink Panthers international jewel thief network is responsible for heists, with their crimes being thought of as "artistry" by criminologists. They have targeted several countries.

Interpol believes that the YACS Crime Group that evolved into The PINK PANTHERS are responsible for US$130 million in bold robberies in Dubai, Switzerland, Japan, France, Germany, Luxembourg, Spain and Monaco. Pink Panthers are believed to be responsible for the robbery of the jewellery store Harry Winston in Paris, on 9 December 2008. The thieves escaped with more than €80 million worth of jewellery. The total worth of jewellery that has been stolen by the Pink Panthers was 250 million € in May, 2010.

=== Australia ===
The first Serbian mafiosi came to Australia in the late 70s, organized in a Yugoslav clan, their headquarters were some 15 kafanas in Sydney, Wollongong and Melbourne.

Milivoje Matović (aka "Miša Kobra") arrived in Sydney in 1986 and became a known gambler who organized big games. His younger brother Braca owed money to the gang of Žorž Stanković, who sent his own son Batica after Matović. Batica was deported to Serbia and Braca was killed in the meantime. Žorž was killed in 1993 and his son Batica was killed in 1996.

In 2005 interviews with Australian Serbs, it was said some 20 Zemun clan members operated in Australia at the time, double the number working prior to Operation Sablja. Serbian boxer Božidar Cvetić who in 2002 was stabbed, now working as a bouncer in Australia said that Australian police had shown him pictures of some 150 Serbian criminals active in Australia.

In May 2007, Australian police saw recruitment to organized crime motorcycle gangs from young Serbs.

=== Austria ===
The Serbian mafia was the main operators of drug trafficking and cigarette smuggling in Austria and Austria was the home to many Serbian gangs.

On 27 October 1978 Veljko Krivоkарić secretly met with Ljubomir Magaš, a member of the gang he had just left, at the Zur Hauptpost coffee house in Vienna. Magaš and another Yugoslav, Rade Ćaldović, grabbed Krivоkарić and fractured his skull with a glass bottle. Stevan Marković's body was found in garbage bags in 1968. He was the former bodyguard of Alain Delon. His godfather, Corsican gangster François Marcantoni, was under investigation for murder and spent 11 months in custody. The Pink Panthers have operated in Austria.

=== Belgium ===
In 1990, Kosovo Albanian activist Enver Hadri was assassinated in Brussels by Veselin "Vesko" Vukotić, Andrija Lakonić, and Darko Ašanin, at the time hired by the UDBA (Yugoslav intelligence).

=== Bulgaria ===
From 1994 to 1997, Zemun clan leader Dušan Spasojević used heroin supplies channels through Sofia. In 1997, 350 kilos of heroin was seized at the Serbian-Bulgarian border. Sreten Jocić (aka "Joca Amsterdam") escaped from custody in Netherlands in 1993; he left for Bulgaria where he would continue his drug smuggling under the pseudonym "Marko Milosavljević" (which happens to be the same name as a noted Serbian football player). He was arrested in 2002 and extradited to the Netherlands.

One Macedonian national and 2 Bulgarians were arrested during the Operation Moonlight linked with the Zemun clan; they trafficked cocaine from Bolivia.

Zemun clan member Nenad "Milenko" Milenković was arrested in 2003 at the Varna resort, following the international warrant by the Serbian police after Operation Sablja. He was suspected of orchestrating at least three murders in Bulgaria and some 20 in Serbia. The Zemun clan successfully managed the drug traffic from Bulgaria after 2003, taking over the market from Surcin-associate Sreten Jocić.

It has been alleged that Bulgarian tycoon Iliya Pavlov was murdered by the Serbian mafia in 2004 and had owed 250 million dollars to Milosević era government figures.

Croatian hitman Robert Matanić and his colleagues were hired by the Zemun clan to kill members of the competing Bulgarian mafia for the Balkan drug route. Dimitar Hristov, Kaloyan Savov and Zhivko Mitev were killed in a shootout on 4 June 2004. Matanić and his men were hired by the Bulgarian gangster Milcho Bonev as bodyguards. Matanić was arrested and detained in Bulgaria. Milcho Bonev was assassinated in 2004, believed to be organized by the Serbian Mafia.

In September 2007, what appeared to be an internal feud resulted in the death of Jovica Lukić and the critical wounding of two other men as well as a mother and her baby. The men were all members of the Zemun clan. Former Litex president Angel Bonchev had business with the Zemun clan. He was kidnapped in 2008. The Zemun clan is active in Bulgaria.

=== Czech Republic ===
In the 1990s, Serbian organised groups were one of the leading syndicates operating in the Czech Republic. A letter was sent to Czech newspapers containing information on a supposed future assassination of President Havel by 4 or 5 members and their whereabouts. The letter, written in broken Czech, was thought by police to have been sent by a rival gang.

=== Denmark ===
Serbian-Danish actor Slavko Labović, who played Radovan in the film Pusher, was arrested, along with his brother, for possession of illegal arms (loaded gun) in Sweden. He was the director of the RK Company in Denmark, an illegal gambling company owned by Rade Kotur (Spelkungen, The Gambling King) a known figure in Sweden who hired the murder of Ratko Đokić.

=== Finland ===
Human trafficking and illegal immigration was growing in Finland has been orchestrated by Serbian organized crime groups since 2004.

=== France ===
Known in French as Mafia Serbe. In 1962, Stevica Marković, Miša Milošević and Radovan Delić arrived in Paris, were part of the "Garderodameri" that was formed in 1966 with the arrival of Marko Nicović.

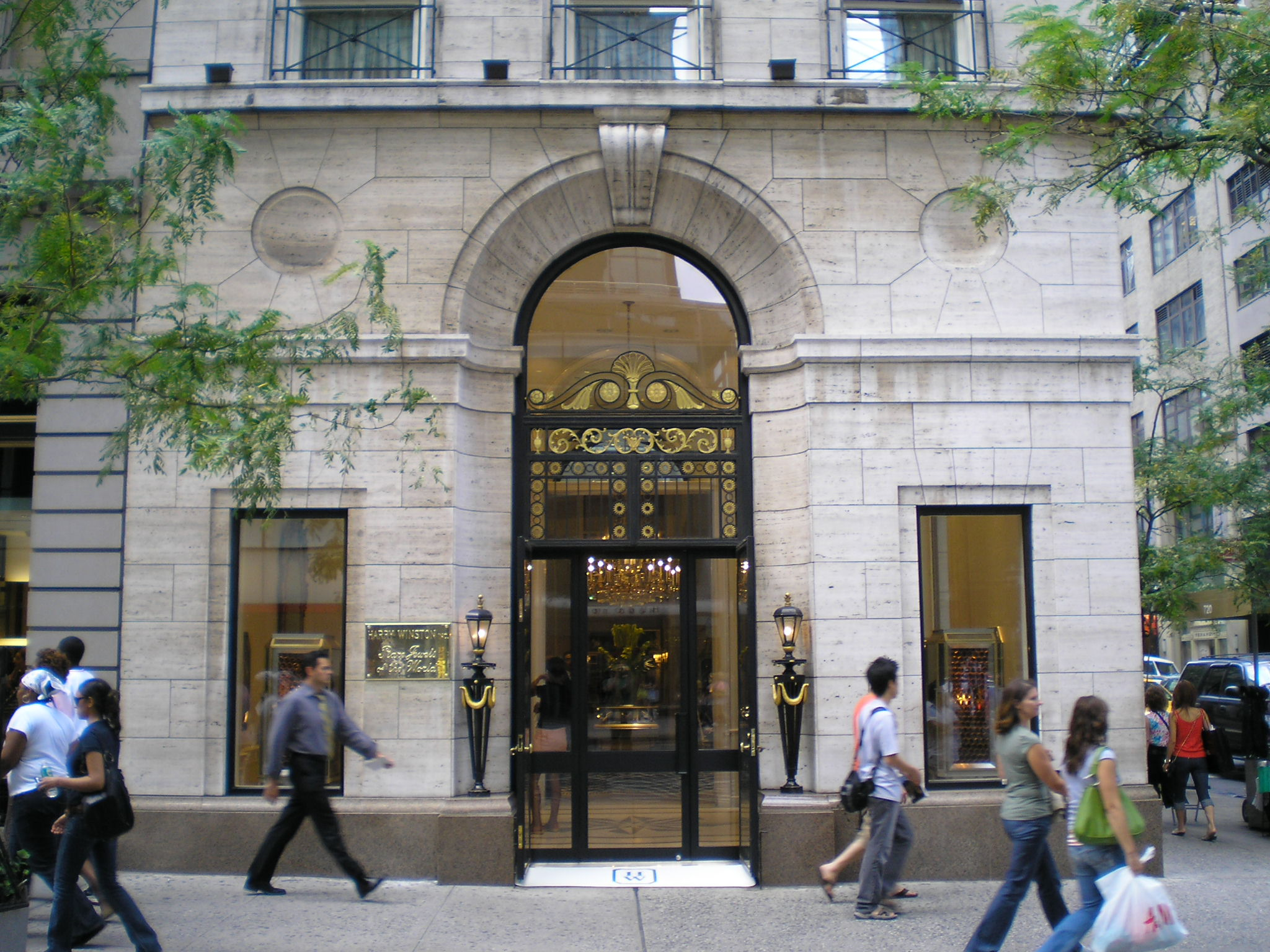
Harry Winston

The Pink Panthers have operated in France. In October 2008, police officials in Monaco arrested two members of the gang, a Serb and a Bosnian Serb. The gang is suspected of jewellery and gems theft at Harry Winston for an estimated value of up to 80 million Euros or 105 million US dollars.

=== Greece ===
After the Yugoslav wars, Kristijan Golubović worked in Greece. In 2002, he escaped from Malandrino, a Greek prison where he had been serving fourteen and a half years for stealing two Mercedes-Benz cars and an armed robbery. In December 2009, two Serbs were arrested suspected of involvement of a major group smuggling cocaine from Peru to Montenegro on luxury yachts. The United States DEA helped the Greek police track the smuggling for five months. Two other Serbs were also wanted in Serbia in connection with this.

=== Germany ===
Known in German as the German: Serbische Mafia, Jugoslawische Mafia. The Serbian mafia was the main operator of cigarette smuggling in Germany in 2004. Ljubomir Magaš ("Ljuba Zemunac", "Ljuba from Zemun", "The Godfather") was the head of the Serbian mafia at the time. He was killed by two shots to the heart from close range in front of a courthouse in Frankfurt, Germany in 1986 by Goran Vuković "Majmun", a member of the Vozdovac clan, who himself survived five murder attempts following the killing before he was assassinated in downtown Belgrade in broad daylight in 1994. Slobodan "Slobo" Grbović left Italy for Germany in the 1970s and became friends with Vaso Letećeg, a thief from Belgrade. In 1981, the friendship ended in a feud over money, Slobo shot and wounded Letećeg and went to prison.

In 1980, Branislav Saranović escaped Wuppertal prison with the help of the Ljuba Zemunac gang who blew up a prison wall. In February 1988, Rade Caldović is appointed the leader in Germany after good relations with the Italian crime groups in Milan. He became friends with Greek businessman Mihail Sainidis, who owns casinos in southern Germany. On 30 March, Zoran Lucić, a Belgrade gangster, killed an Albanian rival in Frankfurt.

In the 1990s, the underground of former Eastern Germany was controlled by Italian, German, Russian, Vietnamese and Serbian organized groups. Leipzig was the centre of money laundering, smuggling, prostitution and protection rackets due to the weak system. The most profitable operations of the groups from former Yugoslavia was car thefts, luxury cars were stolen in Germany and sold to Eastern Europe, North Africa and Far East.

Andrija Drašković, an heir to Arkan's syndicate following the latter's assassination, was arrested by German police in Frankfurt after four years on the run from the Italian Anti-Organized Crime Unit. Drašković is believed to have organized the murder of his former boss, Arkan.

=== Hungary ===
The main organized crime groups in Hungary in 2004 were the Bulgarian and Serbian mafias.

=== Romania ===
In 2019 the Romanian police arrested two Serbian citizens after finding more than a ton of high-quality cocaine on the Black Sea coast that was clearly intended for transit across the country.

=== Italy ===
Dado "Metko" Cerović and Ibrahim "Belo" Habibović were the most powerful Yugoslav criminals in Milan before moving to Genova. In 1971 Ljubomir Magaš arrived in Italy with "Dača" and settled in Milan. His friend, Rade "Centa" Ćaldović was shot in his stomach in Verona by a rival, Bata Glavac. Ćaldović was later sent to a Rome prison. The Yugoslav mafia in Milan was formed by Magas, Arkan, Ćaldović, Veljko Krivоkарić, Slobodan "Slobo Crnogorac" Grbović, Milan Civija, Dule Milanović, Mile Ojdanić, Sava Somborac, Pera Oziljak, Marinko Magda, and Đorđe "Giška" Bozović. They carried out holdups, murders and burglaries in Trieste, Rome, and Milan.

Ibrahim "BELO" (called "Drago lo Belo" in Italian) was a Serbian gangster who found his way to Milan, he was connected with a godfather of the 'Ndrangheta in Calabria. He was involved with gambling, bank and jewellery robberies. An influx of gangsters from SR Montenegro strengthened the Yugoslav position in the Italian underworld. Đorđe Božović, Vlasto Petrović Crnogorac, and Darko Ašanin were connected with mafiosi operating from Montenegro; Branko and Slobodan Šaranović, Brano Mićunović and Ratko "Cobra" Đokić, Sarajevo; Miša Martinović, Zagreb; Marko Vlahović. In the same time Slobodan Grbović (aka "Slobo Crnogorac") left for Germany and teamed up with Vaso Letećeg, a thief from Belgrade.

During the 1990s the 'Ndrangheta acquired weapon arsenal (Bazookas, explosives, automatic firearms) built in Serbia, imported through firms outside Italy. From 1994 to 2000 illegal cigarette smuggling in Italy was operated by the Serbian mafia together with the Italian crime groups.

Zemun clan member Ninoslav Konstantinović fled the Netherlands to Italy after his brother was arrested in 2003. In Italy he became a leading heroin distributor and professional hitman, working for the Camorra in Naples.

In May 2009, Vladimir Jovanović, a former Zemun clan member and Interpol wanted was arrested in Italy.

The presence of Serbian OC groups, among others, have increased rapidly the later years because of the badly controlled coastline.

=== Luxemburg ===
International burglary networks were present in 2004, mainly from Southeastern Europe (the Balkans).

=== Montenegro ===
Montenegro was in a state union with Serbia from 1991 to 2006. The Serbian mafia is the leading criminal group in Montenegro. Many of the Belgrade crime groups that were not caught during Operation Sablja hid in Montenegro. The Zemun clan is active in Montenegro.

=== Netherlands ===
There have been a number of unsolved murder cases in Rotterdam that have been linked to the activities of Serbian Organized Crime gangs. In recent years the Serbian mafia has been growing strong in the Netherlands. By 2004, ecstasy and heroin in Netherlands had originated from the Balkans.

Sreten Jocić (aka "Joca Amsterdam"), is a hitman and a drug dealer. He is considered the leader for the Serbian mafia in Amsterdam. On Christmas Eve, 1974, Slobodan Mitrić killed three alleged UDBA members in Amsterdam. In 1977, Emilio Di Giovine was wounded and two of his men killed by rival Yugoslavs.

On 24 October 1979, Arkan, Slobodan Kostovski, and an unnamed Italian accomplice were arrested while robbing a jewelry store in Amsterdam, they had days earlier robbed a jeweller in Hague and were sought in several countries. On 8 May 1981, Arkan escaped from the Bijlmerbajes prison in Amsterdam with Sergio Settimo, an Italian national, one of the most sought-after criminals in Europe.

In 1992, a member of the Chinese Triad was killed after a debt to the Serbian Mafia. The Serbian OC groups have become stronger and has superseded the Russian Mafia in Netherlands and the arms trade is shared by Serbian and Turkish groups.

=== Norway ===
Non-Norwegian gangs and organized crime groups came to dominate Norway's drug trade in the 1980s. During the 1990s Norway saw a large influx of Yugoslavs seeking refugee status due to the conflict in the Balkan region.

=== Slovenia ===
Slovenia has witnessed a growing trend of human trafficking by Balkan organized crime groups since 2004. Serbian organized crime has operated the cigarette smuggling and arms trafficking.

=== Spain ===
A growing trend of auto theft was seen by southeastern European organized crime groups since 2004. Serbian organized crime groups grew their presence in Spain.

=== Sweden ===
Known in Swedish as: Serbiska maffian or Serbiska Brödraskapet, earlier Jugoslaviska maffian or Juggemaffian during the years of Yugoslavia. And more specifically known as the Serbian Brotherhood encompassing territory from Sweden to Denmark. The Serbian mafia or Serbian Brotherhood in Sweden was said to be the top criminal organisation, but its influence has declined since the deaths of several leading figures. A war was fought over the control of the trade of narcotics and cigarettes between Serbian Organized Crime leaders which resulted in the deaths of Joksa and Ratko Đokić.

Individuals associated to Serbian Organized Crime in Sweden include:

- Ratko Đokić, "The Godfather", an arms dealer and cigarette smuggler; he was assassinated on 5 May 2003 by Serbian hitmen hired by Rade Kotur, another notorious Serbian criminal.
- Dragan "Jokso" Joksović, notorious gambler and assumed cigarette smuggler, was murdered on 4 February 1998 in Solvalla, Stockholm by a Finnish hitman hired by "Kova". He was a close friend of Arkan and is said to have helped Arkan on many occasions. Arkan and many other known mafia figures attended his funeral. As revenge, "Kova" was later killed in front of 60 guests on Arkan's orders.
- Milan Ševo, Bosnian Serb declared to be the last Head of the Serbian mafia in Sweden. He has survived numerous murder attempts. In 2004, he escaped from prison. He married Ratko Đokić's daughter in 1999.

Sweden saw a large influx of ethnic Serbs during the 1960s/70s, when the "Arbetskraftsinvandring" took place; The labour force of immigrants who were granted citizenship (similar to Gastarbeiter programme). In the 1980s the Serbs were the main operators of drug smuggling in Sweden.

In 2003, in a storage room located in the Vårby Gård suburbs, the Swedish police found silenced firearms; Ak47s, Uzis, MP5s, grenades, plastic explosives and mines. The arsenal was used by the Serbian Mafia in Sweden, the owner of the storage was Milan Ševo, son-in-law of Ratko Đokić, former head of the Serbian mafia. This title was soon inherited by Ševo. On 5 May 2003, Đokić was assassinated outside his boxing club in Skärholmen. One of the hitmen, Nenad Mišović, was arrested in Europe years later. Mišović came to Sweden in 2002 after fleeing the police in Serbia. He was hired by Rade Kotur, a rival of Đokić In 2004, the Serbian mafia dominated the organized crime in Sweden, known uncovered operations were doping substances.

=== United Kingdom ===
On 2 June 2009, six Serbs were convicted, together with several Israelis, in smuggling of 12.5 ton (£36m) marijuana, orchestrated by the Israeli mafia. The marijuana was seized as it travelled from Larache, Morocco to Southampton on a tugboat under an Israeli flag. The Pink Panthers have operated in London.

=== United States ===
There has been known involvement of Balkan crime groups in the United States. One of the most notorious Serbs that arrived in New York City 1956 was Vojislav Stanimirovic, aka MR Stan, criminal turned journalist. He was responsible for the Vizcaya Heist. His son, Pavle Stanimirović, continued the tradition. The best known is Boško Radonjić, leader of the Irish-American organized crime group "the Westies", and a trusted enforcer of Gambino family boss John Gotti from 1988 to 1992.

== In popular culture ==
The Serbian mafia has appeared in a number of films, novels and video games. They have appeared in:

=== In film ===
- Absolute 100 (2001), Serbian drama/thriller, young and talented sport shooter decides to get revenge on gangsters who destroyed the life of his brother
- Assault on Precinct 13 (2005), American action thriller
- Point Blank (2016), German TV film about an undercover cop infiltrating the Serbian sportsbet mafia in Germany
- Beck – Kartellen, Swedish crime thriller, about the case of a murdered restaurant owner
- Bröderna Jaukka, Swedish short film
- The Crew (2008 film), British drama/dark comedy
- Do koske, Serbian crime/action/dark comedy
- In China They Eat Dogs, Danish action-comedy, about a debt to Serb gangsters
- In Order of Disappearance, Norwegian action/dark comedy depicting a war between Norwegian and Serbian gangsters
- South Wind, Serbian action film, about young Serbian car thieves chased by Serbian crime lord, corrupt police chief and Bulgarian gangsters
- Layer Cake, British action film with Daniel Craig
- Leo, Swedish drama, about the revenge of his wife's murder
- Klopka (2007), Serbian drama/thriller, set in post-Milošević era, it tells the story of a man who desperately needs money for his son's surgery, when a mysterious man appears offering money in exchange for the murder of a mafia boss
- Mlad i zdrav kao ruža, widely considered to be a visionary movie, it was banned in communist Yugoslavia. It portrays a 1970s mobster who, supported by the Yugoslav secret service UDBA, rises to become a crime lord
- Pusher trilogy, a series of Danish films illustrating and exploring the criminal underworld of Copenhagen.
  - Pusher, 1996 Danish crime thriller.
  - Pusher II, 2004 Danish crime thriller.
  - Pusher 3, 2005 Danish crime thriller.
- Pusher, 2012 British remake of the 1996 Danish original.
- Paradiset, Swedish drama/thriller
- Rane, Serbian crime/drama/dark comedy, widely considered to be a cult classic
- Ride Along, 2014 American action comedy
- Snabba Cash, Swedish action, about criminal activities in Stockholm, one of the protagonists is a Serbian Mafia henchman
- Snabba Cash II
- Poslednji krug u Monci. A 1980s Belgrade criminal reaches Italy searching for a man who owes him money, but gradually becomes the leader of the Italian branch of Yugoslav/Serbian mafia
- Straight Business 2, Canadian International Short Film
- Straight Business 3, Canadian International Short Film
- The Sweeney, 2012 British action drama
- The Fourth Man, Serbian action/thriller
- Vidimo se u čitulji, Serbian documentary about the organized crime in Belgrade during the 1990s

=== On television ===
- Dosije: Beogradski klanovi (2014), docudrama series about Serbian mafia clans in Belgrade during the 1990s
- Dosije: Zemunski klan (2015), sequel to the popular docudrama series, it shows the rise and fall of Zemun Clan, one of the most powerful crime groups in Serbia's history.
- Gorki plodovi, Serbian TV series
- Grupa (2019), Serbian TV series about a group of young street dealers and Belgrade police force tracking them down
- Meso (2017), Serbian TV series about a former soccer player from Banja Luka who comes back to his home town and confronts his childhood friend, now a crime boss
- Ubice mog oca, Serbian crime/action TV show, which shows ties between mafia, politicians, tycoons and corrupt policemen
- In the American TV series Power, the Serbian mafia, led by Jason Micic are major antagonists in seasons 2–6.
- South Wind, connected with a movie, South Wind is about Belgrade criminals who are work with Bulgarian narco boss, later fights against him. Also, they are rivals with Montenegrin narco boss.

=== In literature ===
- The First Rule, novel by Robert Crais. Author claims to portray Serbian mafia in the US accurately, however, there are many inaccuracies (Serbian mafia does not abide to the Russian "Thief in law" gangster code, and it never did).
- Millennium (novel series) mentions Serbian mafia members on several occasions.

=== In video games ===
- Grand Theft Auto IV, American 2008 open world action-adventure video game. The main protagonist, Niko Bellic, is a Yugoslav man involved in organised crime.

== See also ==
- Crime in Serbia
- Serbian Brotherhood
