= Montenegrin mafia =

- Founding location: Bar
- Years active: 1992–present
- Territory: Europe: The Balkans, Spain, Italy, Belgium, Netherlands, Ukraine; South America: Uruguay, Brazil, Colombia, Ecuador
- Ethnicity: Montenegrins
- Criminal activities: Arson, cocaine trafficking, tobacco smuggling, loan-sharking, extortion, murder, gambling, assault
- Allies: Penose; Serbian mafia 'Ndrangheta; Camorra; Sacra Corona Unita; Colombian drug cartels Mexican drug cartels
- Rivals: Berane and Cetinje clan wars

The Montenegrin mafia (Crnogorska mafija/Црногорска мафија) refers to the various criminal organizations based in Montenegro or composed of Montenegrins. Outside of the country Montenegrin gangs are active throughout Europe-notably Serbia. The gangs tend to specialize in narcotics smuggling, tobacco smuggling and arms trafficking.

2021 Serious and Organized Crime Threat Assessment of Montenegro (SOCTA) identifies 10 high-risk organized crime groups in Montenegro, with Kavač and Škaljari clans being by far most prominent, and playing the central role in so called Balkan cartel. Most of the other high risk organized crime groups in Montenegro are either subservient to, or allied with one of two aforementioned Kotor clans. Major crime groups in Montenegro specialize in narcotics smuggling, although highly profitable cigarette smuggling is a focus of several criminal associations.

== Kotor clans ==
Kotor is a coastal town in Montenegro, which has a long maritime trade history, and is home to Montenegro's sole naval faculty. Thus, since most of Montenegro's educated merchant seamen come from Kotor, the city has emerged as a recruitment ground for sailors tasked with smuggling cocaine on cargo ships, on a South America - Europe route.

Kotor clan came to prominence during 2000s, the under the leadership of Darko Šarić and Dragan Dudić "Fric". This criminal organization was suspected of operating one of the largest cocaine smuggling schemes, on a South America - Europe route. They reinvested the proceeds from their criminal enterprise into numerous business ventures in Montenegro and the region, including high profile nightclubs and hotels.

In 2010, Dragan Dudić was murdered in Kotor, while Šarić clan was largely neutralized in regional police action "Balkan Warrior". The remainder of Kotor clan has split into two factions - Kavač and Škaljari clans. These two organized crime groups are engaged in a bitter gang war since 2015, with as many as 50 dead on both sides, murdered in Montenegro and throughout Europe, usually in carefully planned targeted murders.

The 2021 takedown of Sky ECC encrypted communication network has shed light on many previously unsolved crimes committed by the two clans, as well as on their connections with various Montenegro police and government officials. However, although Sky ECC takedown has weakened the clans, they remain the two most powerful criminal groups in Montenegro, and possibly in the Balkans.

Both clans have offshoots and associates in countries of the Balkans region, as well as in rest of Europe - Spain (major transit and unloading point for cocaine shipments, particularly Valencia, Balearic and Canary Islands), Italy (using Port of Gioia Tauro as a transit point of cocaine shipments, in cooperation with 'Ndrangheta), Austria, Netherlands, Germany, Belgium, Greece, Hungary, Ukraine and Turkey. Also, clans maintain a direct presence in South America, with ports in Brazil, Ecuador and Uruguay being identified as loading points for Montenegro cocaine smugglers.

According to investigations, the Montenegrin groups have established, in the early 1990s, a strong alliance with the Camorra and the Sacra Corona Unita, which started in the cigarette smuggling trade but has become in particular an strategic alliance for the entry of drugs into Italy.

== Kavač clan ==
Named after the Kotor village of Kavač, this clan is currently led by Radoje Zvicer. This clan is suspected to be close with remainder of Šarić clan, and Veljko Belivuk criminal group from Serbia. The clan also has a strong presence in Herceg Novi, Podgorica, Nikšić and Cetinje

=== Bečići clan ===
Bečići clan is an organized criminal group based in Bečići, a suburb of Budva. This clan is closely allied with Kavač clan, and is led by Vasilije Rafailović. It is unclear whether Bečići clan can be considered a separate criminal group, or an independent faction of Kavač clan.

== Škaljari clan ==
Named after the Kotor village of Škaljari, this clan was led by Jovan Vukotić, until his murder in 2022. This clan is suspected to be close with Bar clan, as well as Zemun clan from Serbia. The clan has a strong presence in Bar, Budva, Cetinje and Podgorica. Škaljari clan is more horizontally organized, with looser ties between highly independent regional factions.

=== Budva clan ===
Budva clan is an organized criminal group based in coastal Montenegrin city of Budva. This clan is closely allied with Škaljari clan, and is led by Marko Ljubiša "Kan" and Saša Boreta. It is unclear weather Budva clan can be considered a separate criminal group, or a highly independent faction of Škaljari clan.

=== Bar clan ===
Bar clan is an organized criminal group based in coastal Montenegrin city of Bar. This clan is allied with Škaljari clan, and is organized in the horizontal manner - higher-ranked members are not necessarily coordinated by any leader, although lately the Bar mafia started regulating its vertical hierarchy making the organization much stronger. The organization has a local reputation to have connections with corrupt high-ranking men in Herceg Novi, Tivat, Kotor, Budva and Ulcinj Regional Police Units.

== Other organized criminal groups ==
=== Berane clan ===
Berane clan is an organized criminal group, operating out of northern Montenegro city of Berane, specialized in narcotics trade, and led by Vuk Vulević. 2021 Serious and Organised Crime Threat Assessment of Montenegro (SOCTA) classifies Berane clan as the third most powerful organized criminal group in Montenegro, although far from influence and power of Kavač and Škaljari clans.

=== Pink Panthers ===
Pink Panthers are an international criminal group, specialized in jewelry heists. It is unknown whether Pink Panthers are sufficiently integrated and coordinated to be classified as a criminal group. However, many heists perpetrated by Montenegrin citizens worldwide have been attributed to Pink Panthers.

== See also ==
- Crime in Montenegro
