= Serb mafia in Scandinavia =

Serbian-Montenegrin mafia in Scandinavia
- Founded by: UDBA
- Founding location: Stockholm, Sweden
- Years active: 1970s–present
- Territory: Stockholm, Malmö, Copenhagen, Gothenburg
- Ethnicity: Serbs, Montenegrins
- Membership (est.): c.250
- Criminal activities: Cigarette smuggling, drug trafficking, robbery, prostitution, extortion, illegal gambling
- Allies: Hells Angels; Brödraskapet; Fucked For Life; Bratva; Obshchak; Zemun Clan; Serb Volunteer Guard
- Rivals: Princ Gang; UÇK; Naser Gang

The Serbian-Montenegrin mafia in Scandinavia, also known as Juggemaffian (English: Yugo Mafia) is an organized crime group in Sweden, Norway and Denmark referred to by its members as the Brotherhood (serbian: Братство). The gang began during the mass immigration of Yugoslav guest-workers to Sweden in the 1970s. The gang is based in the cities of Stockholm and Copenhagen, and has territory in Malmö and Gothenburg, among other cities in western Sweden. They received significant media attention in Sweden during the 1990s, thanks to flashy top-ranking members such as Dragan "Jokso" Joksović. The founder and first leader of the gang is believed to be warlord Željko "Arkan" Ražnatović, and the current leader is alleged to be Milan Ševo.

== History ==
The beginnings of the "Yugo mafia" came with the large waves of guest-workers from Yugoslavia to Northern Europe in the 1960s and 1970s. During this time Socialist Yugoslavia was emptying its prisons and flooding Western Europe with Yugoslav criminals, many of whom created organized criminal rings in Germany, Austria, Denmark, and Sweden. One of these newly freed criminals was Željko "Arkan" Ražnatović, who in 1972 began organizing large heists and hijackings across Western Europe, accumulating a group of subordinates, wealth, and a feared reputation in the underworld. Those Yugoslavs that arrived first in New York and the first known notable people that made a name for themselves is Alexander Karalanović and Vojislav Stanimirović, and later Boško Radonjić became internationally known first because of The Vizcaya Museum Robbery Heist and all the media and arrest coverage World Wide in 1971 this put Mr Stan Yugo Mafia and The YACS Crime Group on the map but back in Europe Arkan moved to Stockholm in 1974 from where he organized five bank robberies and 12 armed robberies across Sweden. In New York multiple heists that were so ahead of its time was happening all over New York. Arkan was at the helm of the gang until 1979, at which point he fled Sweden due to Interpol Warrants. The YACS started pulling off lucrative Jewelry Heists and they opened the first known vault in NYC .

Arkan's childhood friend Dragan "Jokso" Joksović is believed to eventually have taken control of the Serb mafia in Sweden, broadening the gang's focus from robbery to cigarette smuggling and extortion. Although indicted multiple times for drug offenses and assault, he was never convicted. Owner of several upscale Stockholm restaurants he had close ties to celebrities and politicians in Sweden - eventually being murdered by hit-men on February 4, 1998.

In the late 1990s disagreements over money, territory and leadership caused a degree of infighting within the Serb mafia in Scandinavia.

Soon after Joksović's murder, the next boss Ratko "Cobra" Đokić was shot 30 times and killed in the center of Stockholm in 2003. Đokić's son-in-law, Milan Ševo, then became the new head of the Serbian Brotherhood - being dubbed "Godfather of Stockholm". Ševo survived several assassination attempts and in 2005 left Stockholm for Belgrade, Serbia, from where he is believed to have continued control of the organization. Ševo is suspected by Swedish and Serbian authorities to be behind the infamous 2009 Stockholm Helicopter Heist worth 10 million euros.

In 2005, the Danish government label the Serb mafia as having a "leading role in smuggling heroin into Denmark", surpassing the Albanians and Turks in the Copenhagen drug market. Besides heroin, the Serb mafia is active in trafficking large quantities of cocaine and marijuana through Sweden and Denmark.

== Popular culture ==
- The Danish film series Pusher, features a Serbian gang.
- Jens Lapidus' book Snabba Cash, which was adapted into film in Easy Money, features the Serb mafia in Sweden.
- A biography on Milan Ševo by Swedish author Nuri Kino entitled The Swedish Godfather.
- TV Documentary broadcast on Swedish TV3 about Dragan "Jokso" Joksović titled Den store Jokso: Gangster eller gentleman ("The Great Jokso: Gangster or Gentleman").
- TV Documentary broadcast on Swedish SVT about Serb mafia in Sweden, titled Cigarettkriget ("The Cigarette War", filmed 1997–1999)
- Book on crime groups in Sweden, titled Svensk maffia ("Swedish Mafia"), has a chapter on the Serb mafia in Sweden.

== People ==
- Dragan "Jokso" Joksović, former boss 1980s-1998 assassinated
- Željko Ražnatović "Arkan", founder, former boss 1970s-1980s
- Ratko Djokić "Cobra", former boss 1998-2003 assassinated
- Rade Kotur, leading chief in control of illegal gambling
- Petar Grujić, advisor assassinated in 2006
- Dragan "Kova" Kovač, soldier killed in 1998
- Milan Ševo, current boss as of 2003, living in Belgrade as of 2006
- Vlasta Petrović, arrived in Sweden in the 1980s
- Mille Markovic

== See also ==
- Serbian mafia
- Pink Panthers (organized crime group)
