= Vojislav Stanimirović =

Vojislav Stanimirović may refer to:

- Vojislav Stanimirović (politician) (born 1953), Croatian politician of Serbian descent
- Vojislav Stanimirović (criminal) (born 1937), Serbian American journalist and high-profile thief
