= Kuljiš =

Kuljiš is a Croatian surname. Notable people with the name include:

- Denis Kuljiš (1951–2019), Croatian writer, entrepreneur and journalist
- Ivo Kuljis (born 1953), Bolivian businessman and politician of Croatian descent
