= Šaranović =

- Language: Serbian

Origin
- Language: ancient Slavic

Other names
- Variant forms: Šarančić, Šaranac, Šaran, Šare

Šaranović is a Serbian family name most common in Bosnia, Montenegro and Serbia. It is derived from ancient Slavic word Šar which is also the basis for other family names like Šarančić, Šaranac, Šaran, and Šare.

Notable people with Šaranović surname include:

- Edin Šaranović
- Anja Šaranović
- Slobodan Šaranović
- Nikola Šaranović (sport shooter)
- Nikola Šaranović (basketball)
