= Sreten Jocić =

Serbian criminal

- Сретен Јоцић
- Born: 24 October 1962 (age 63); Velika Krsna, PR Serbia, Yugoslavia
- Other name: Joca Amsterdam
- Status: Released
- Criminal charges: Murder
- Penalty: 15 years' imprisonment

Details
- Victims: 1
- Date: July 1995
- Target: Goran Marjanović

Sreten Jocić (Serbian Cyrillic: Сретен Јоцић; born 24 October 1962), also known as Joca Amsterdam (Serbian Cyrillic: Јоца Амстердам), is a Serbian gangster from Velika Krsna who operated in the Netherlands. In June 2010 he was sentenced to 15 years' imprisonment for the murder of Goran Marjanović in July 1995, and since 2013 he is serving his sentence in Zabela prison in Požarevac, Serbia.

In April 2016 Jocić sought damages against the state of Serbia for unlawful detainment in another murder investigation, the death of Croatian journalist Ivo Pukanić, for 60 million dinars (approximately €500,000). His trial in that case has already cost the state 11 million dinars in legal fees.
