= Dragan Joksović =

Swedish criminal

- Born: 11 August 1956; Pljevlja, Montenegro, Yugoslavia
- Died: 4 February 1998 (aged 41); Stockholm, Sweden
- Cause of death: Gunshot wounds
- Other name: "Jokso"
- Occupation: Mobster
- Height: 199 cm (6 ft 6 in)

Dragan "Jokso" Joksović (11 August 1956 – 4 February 1998) was a Swedish-Montenegrin mobster. The police believed that Joksović could be called the Stockholm "gangster king", being largely suspected of controlling cigarette smuggling into Sweden and Denmark. Brought to court many times, he was only convicted of minor drug offenses, assault and abuse of judicial procedure. He was murdered at the Solvalla Horse Racing Track in Stockholm on 4 February 1998 by Finnish hitman Janne Raninen. His nose was broken, and he was shot to death at a distance of three meters. Janne surrendered himself to two security guards working in the restaurant where the shooting took place. Although Raninen claims to have fired four shots, two staff at the betting booth in front of which Joksović was murdered were also hit by bullets from the shooting, suggesting more shots were fired. Both staff members were taken to a hospital; one had been penetrated in the arm by a passing bullet and the other had only been grazed by the firing. A bystander in the queue at the betting booth was also hit in the shoulder.

Joksović's family moved to Titograd shortly after his birth. He grew up in Titograd together with Lazo Delević, with whom he also earned a reputation as a street fighter and muscleman. He fled to Sweden in 1979 from the Former Yugoslavia after beating a military officer to avoid prosecution. There, he befriended Željko "Arkan" Ražnatović, another Serbian gangster and killer, who later became his godbrother.

He owned several top restaurants in Stockholm and several racehorses, going to the race track at least a couple of times a month. Joksović was good friends with associate mobster Ratko Đokić, and acted as a mentor to current boss Milan Ševo.

Joksović's assassin shot him in the head twice at close range, then fired three more shots to the body. After his death, Ražnatović allegedly cried for the first time in his life. Joksović's killer was sentenced in 1998 to 8 years in prison. He served his sentence in Finland and got out 3rd of june 2003 after serving 5 years and 3 months of his sentence. The murder of Joksović was the beginning of a Serbian gang war in Sweden. The hit on Joksović was ordered by one of Joksović's soldiers, Dragan Kovač, over money issues. Five months later, on 9 July 1998, Kovač was murdered with a submachine gun outside a Stockholm restaurant in broad daylight.

Joksović was physically imposing and is remembered as one of the strongest of Montenegrin gangsters. His most notable fight was with Đorđe Božović in the garden of Ratko Đokić's house in Zlatica neighbourhood of Podgorica. Fight ended in draw. Giška later recounted that he was "the toughest man he ever fought".

== See also ==
- Serbian Brotherhood
- Serbian Mafia
- Easy Money (Lapidus novel)
