= Fucked For Life =

Criminal network in Sweden

- Founder: Daniel Maiorana
- Years active: 1993/1997–present
- Territory: Tumba, Stockholm
- Ethnicity: Italians, Serbs, Greeks, Spaniards, Swedes
- Membership: c.40 members
- Activities: Car thefts, motorcycle thefts, armed robberies, drug trafficking
- Allies: Serbian mafia

Fucked for Life (FFL) is a criminal network in Sweden, probably founded by Daniel Maiorana (born c. 1977). At the core of the network are 12 men, some of whom have "FFL" tattooed on their arms or neck.

== History ==
The gang was initially named "Tumba Lords" after Tumba, a southern suburb of Stockholm, but later changed its name "Fucked for Life" at the end of the 1990s. The gang originally consisted of 5 members, but police estimates said the number had increased to approximately 40 members in 2004. FFL had begun with the theft of mopeds and motocross-cycles, but in recent years they have been occupied with robbing ATMs and armoured transports.

Maiorana was released from Hall Prison on 14 February 2002, where he had served a four-and-a-half-year sentence for robbery and assault. After his release, a crime wave associated with FFL began in Stockholm, until he was arrested and sentenced to seven years in prison. He escaped from custody on 18 January 2004 but was arrested again. He escaped yet again on 28 July 2004, together with Tony Olsson, a convict serving a life sentence for the Malexander murders. Both men were again arrested shortly after their escape.

== Sources ==
- DN mentioning the organization "The Postal Robbery in Gothenburg" 22 January 2008 DN – Nyheter
- Fucked for life Brå – Brottsförebyggande rådet – Krönika: Fucked for life Brottsförebyggande rådet, 2005.
- Moppestöld första brottet Aftonbladet.
