= Nenad Mišović =

Nenad Mišović was a Serbian-born Swedish resident sentenced to life in prison for the murder of Ratko Djokić in May 2003. The prosecution argued that Mišović worked as a hit man on behalf of gangster Rade Kotur. Though uncooperative with investigations into Kotur's activities during his trial, after conviction Mišović provided police with details of his recruitment by Kotur to carry out attacks against Djokić in Skärholmen in 2003, and against another man in the Stockholm suburb of Fisksätra in 2002.

Prior to his arrival in Sweden in 2002, Mišović was in Serbia where he was involved in organized crime; he left the country to avoid arrest.

In August 2008 Mišović was tried alongside Kotur for the Fisksätra murder attempt. On trial he recanted his earlier testimony regarding his work for Kotur. Mišović died on the 21st July 2021 in Norrtälje prison.
