= Principi group =

Principi
- Founded: 2013 (under the name Janjičari); 2018 (reformation; under the name Principi)
- Founder: Aleksandar Stanković, Veljko Belivuk
- Named after: Gavrilo Princip
- Founding location: Ritopek, Serbia
- Years active: 2013-2021 ("first form") 2022-present ("second form")
- Membership: 70 (group members), 500+ hooligans and supporters with allegiance
- Leaders: Veljko Belivuk, Marko Miljković (2018-present)
- Activities: Drug smuggling, extortion, murder, protection racketeering, loansharking, football hooliganism, vandalism, torture, kidnapping
- Allies: Kavač clan, Grobari subgroups
- Rivals: Škaljari clan, Delije, Pink Panthers, Alcatraz firm, Vračarski clan

The Principi group, also known as Belivuk-Miljković clan, founded under the name Janjičari, is a Serbian notorious hooligan firm of JSD Partizan, that was allegedly involved in organized crime, and was founded by Veljko Belivuk and Aleksandar Stanković. From a local vandals and hooligans in JSD Partizan's basketball and football matches, it grew into one of the most powerful hooligan firms in the Balkan region. It was founded in Ritopek, a suburban neighbourhood of Belgrade, Serbia. The crimes that allegedly Principi committed in the span of 5–8 years were extortion, intimidation, kidnapping, torture and mutilation, murder and drug sales. With allegiance to Kavač clan and contact with over 29 other Grobari subgroups, Principi have significant control over various businesses and hooligan-type activities around Serbia.

== Formation before Football ==
The Principi criminal group is linked to Veljko Belivuk and Darko Elez, the mastermind of the criminal underworld in Republika Srpska, and the leader of Elez gang. They worked together, celebrated the murders of rival mobsters and were on the verge of joining a clan that would rule a large territory of Serbia and Bosnia and Herzegovina. Belivuk and Elez had the same boss, Radoje Zvicer, a Montenegrin criminal and a leader of Kavač clan.

== Football-based activities ==
Later in 2013, Aleksandar Stanković, known as Sale Mutavi, a leader of newly formed Partizan supporters group called "Janjičari", invited his colleague Belivuk, and his best man Marko Miljković to join his new crew. At the end of 2016, after the murder of Sale, Belivuk and Miljković took control over the crew, changing the name to Principi, after a Serbian historical figure Gavrilo Princip. In 2018, Principi became the leading group on the south stand on Partizan Stadium, and almost all subgroups of hooligans on the south stand gave allegiance to Belivuk and Miljković.

After the arrest of 19 core members of the organization, Belivuk and Miljković continued the criminal control over the organization, making Principi hidden from the south stand for few months before returning in 2022. Reformed organization was set under the leadership of Kolaković, a close friend of Belivuk who was in jail during his rule. Kolaković commanded hooligans and organizations football operations, while Belivuk and Miljković gives the instructions. Kolaković allegedly left the country after multiple assassination attempts.

=== Formation of Omerta group ===
In early 2022, two of Prelić's men had a meeting with Kavač clan leader on forming a new subgroup of Principi, named Omerta. After the agreement, Marko Miljković's cousin took control over it, while Marko commands it. The group is considered as an enforcer crew of much larger Principi and operates drug trafficking, gunrunning and prostitution rings for the organization. It is alleged that through Marko Miljković's wife, Tamara, who moved to Paris, France, and gained legal citizenship there, are the operations conducted. She is technically the leader of the group, with help of Đorđević and Timotijević. Omerta also acts as the leading hooligan firm who controls all the finances, stands, operations of the Grobari supporters. Omerta doesn't go on the south stand, but operates behind everything, with Principi themselves controlling the mini-subgroup. In Amsterdam, Dutch police arrested few Serbian hooligans of Partizan of suspecting drug trafficking, but were let off after 24 hours because of lack of evidence. 2 Days later, 2 murders happened in Amsterdam, with both people being connected to Dutch organized crime. Omerta dissoluted in mid-2023.

== Criminal activities ==
Belivuk was arrested in Belgrade on February 5, 2021. He was accused in Bosnia of at least two murders. Siniša Miličević, nicknamed Tigar, who was brutally murdered on June 1, 2018, and Miloš Ostojić who was killed on January 2, 2019. They were close to Đorđe Ždrala, known as Đoka, Elez's former godfather with whom he had been in conflict for years.

In a major police operation, in which the DEA and the Serbian police participated, 18 other people, along with Belivuk, were arrested. They were suspected of several serious crimes including drug trafficking, extortion, blackmail, murder and mutilation. Belivuk was arrested in Rudnik, where he allegedly went to burn vehicles used in criminal acts. The police found a bunker and several other rooms that served Belivuk's criminal group at the Partizan Stadium. Drugs and weapons were found, including a sniper rifle. Police also found 15 people in the so-called "barracks".

Belivuk became known to the general public in 2016 after the attack on Boža Kumburović and Nebojša Petrović, members of the security of FK Partizan's director Miloš Vazura. He was sentenced to one year of house arrest without electronic tagging. The media classified Belivuk in the so-called Kavač clan, which has been at war with the Škaljari clan for years.

The group is active throughout the Balkans, with waging war against Škaljari clan, Principi and Kavač clan are trying to take as much territory as they can. They are also involved in an organized crime ring, nicknamed by the media as 'Balkan Cartel'. In 2024, it is leaked that the groups presence is high in a small border city, Kikinda, with their operations of drug-weapon smuggling with Romanian allies are high and efficient for the groups funding from the city. Grobari from Kikinda are the core members and operatives for the clan. The ringleader is unknown, while their membership is unknown, it is claimed that they have high importance for the groups operations.

=== Murder of Oliver Ivanović ===
This group was accused together with the group around Zvonko Veselinović of participating in the assassination of Oliver Ivanović. According to those claims, "Principi" were in charge of immediate execution, while logistics were provided by Milan Radoičić and everything was organized by Zvonko Veselinović. Ljubomir Lainović was the immediate executor, and Aleksandar Gligorijević was the courier. Gligorijević was later killed in an internal conflict between the Principi group members, and Belivuk was blamed for his murder. Lainović disappeared, and it is speculated that he was brutally tortured and killed by Škaljari (an opposing clan), two of whose high-ranking members he also killed.

=== Aftermath of Belivuk's arrest and political activities ===
After the Belivuk's arrest, groups core members completely changed, with Serbian government claiming the group is officially "tarnished". A lot of football fanatical supporters and fellow football hooligans claim that the group still operates, but with new leadership. It is alleged that Marko Budimir "Kantona" is running the groups operations, while Uroš Kolaković is the new leader of the group on the south stand since 2022. The two group leaders are alleged as new group leaders in more decentralized mannor, with less members than before arresting of Belivuk. Three core members of the gang, Bojan Hrvatin, Nikola Spasojević and most notorious of the three, Srđan Lalić, who committed most of the gang's murders, became collaborative witnesses with a Special Court for Organized Crime in Serbia, few months after arrest. After 1 year of trial, Lalić claimed that clan Belivuk-Miljković committed approximately 17 murders that are not on the court papers, instead of official six murders they are on trial for.

According to news letters and police investigations in Serbia, Belivuk and Miljković are in contact with over 29 Grobari supporters groups in Serbia and Serbian diaspora. The list of supporters group with allegiance to Principi ultras was leaked by Republika.rs newsletter: 40+, South Guard, Još Neko Kopa, Anti Romi, Alternativa, Vandal Boys, Obrenovac, Commando, Alo Požega and Ludnica Kovin. But also multiple Grobari groups from Padinjak, Novi Sad, Vršac, Republika Srpska, Trebinje, Vukovar, Nikšić, Bar, Kraljevo, Niš, Kragujevac, Kruševac. In Serbian diaspora, Belivuk and Miljković's close allies from Serbian diaspora are Grobari's offshoot organizations based in Amsterdam, Zurich, Paris, Vienna, Stockholm, Stuttgart, Vicenza and Ljubljana. But two groups are specified as the "best friends" with Principi on the south stand, those groups being Anti Romi (based out in Karaburma) and Commando (based out in Zemun and Medaković)

In 2022, a cooperating witness Srđan Lalić, one of high-ranking members of the group, leaked how the gang wanted to assassinate president of Serbia, Aleksandar Vučić, due to his "betrayal" to the group. Belivuk and Miljković, the two leaders of the gang, also noted that they have no trust in the government of Vučić, and that whole Principi are not sided with the government and should not be considered as "SNS-led" group, as it was thought before. Currently, the group is known for their anti-government stands and graffiti around the country, and are notably targeted by the Police because of this. After a landslide victory of Student List in 2026 Serbian parliamentary election, Belivuk's partner, Bojana, posted a video on social media celebrating the win of Students, and visibly screaming "Freedom!", indirectly implying that freedom of Belivuk and Miljković is assured soon after SNS government fell.

== See also ==
- Serbian mafia
- Corruption in Serbia
- Crime in Serbia
- Zemun Clan
