= Hall Prison =

Prison in Södertälje Municipality, Sweden

Anstalten Hall
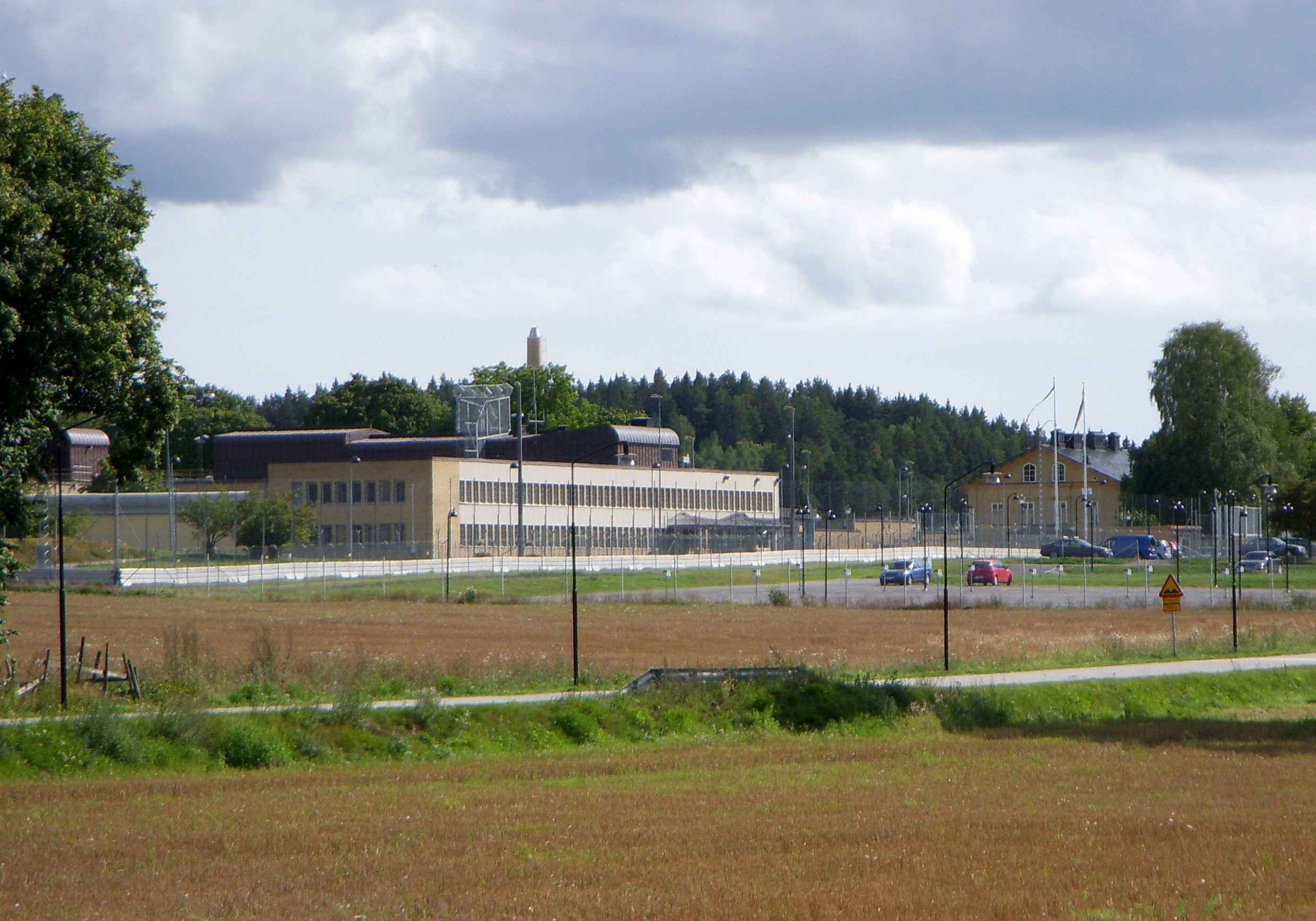
- Hall Prison, 2009.
- Interactive map of Anstalten Hall
- Location: Södertälje, Stockholm County, Sweden; 59°9′51″N 17°40′45″E
- Status: Operational
- Security class: Maximum
- Capacity: 165
- Opened: 1940
- Managed by: Swedish Prison and Probation Service
- Warden: Mats Ehn (acting)

Hall Prison (Swedish: Anstalten Hall) is a prison facility 5 kilometres southeast of Södertälje, Sweden. The prison is one of the largest in Sweden and is categorised as an A-prison.

== History ==
The prison opened in 1940, although the old facility dates back to 1875.

- On 28 July 2004, Tony Olsson, Daniel Maiorana, Alfred Sansiviero and Mahmoud Amaya managed to make a getaway from the prison.
