= Nacional (weekly) =

Croatian news magazine

- Cover of the issue no. 866, 19 June 2012
- Editor-in-chief: Berislav Jelinić
- Frequency: Weekly
- Circulation: Online
- Founder: Ivo Pukanić
- First issue: 23 November 1995
- Company: Nacional News Corporation d.o.o.
- Country: Croatia
- Based in: Zagreb
- Language: Croatian
- Website: www.nacional.hr
- ISSN: 1330-9048

Nacional is a Croatian weekly news magazine published in Zagreb. Founded in 1995 and owned by photographer and journalist Ivo Pukanić, Nacional quickly gained a reputation for reporting and critical articles about the conservative government led by the Croatian Democratic Union (HDZ), which was in power during the 1990s. During most of its existence its main rival was Globus published by Europapress Holding (EPH).

== History ==
Nacional was launched in 1995 by Denis Kuljiš, Ivo Pukanić and other prominent journalists dissatisfied with the editorial policies of then popular weekly Globus. Soon a bitter competition developed between two magazines, because they tried to grab the same readership and used the same techniques of investigative journalism.

In 2000 Pukanić stepped down as editor-in-chief to oversee the launch of his short-lived daily Republika, which was meant to compete with EPH's Jutarnji list. Republika was launched in late 2000, only to fold in May 2001 due to low circulation. After 2000 Nacional's editorial policy shifted to include more business and entertainment content. Following the failure of Republika Pukanić returned to the magazine as an investigative reporter.

Shortly after the 2008 assassination of Ivo Pukanić, the magazine's sales plummeted, and in 2010 it was bought by a Swiss media company owned by Harald von Seefried. Soon after the acquisition a group of journalists dissatisfied by the new owner's editorial policies left Nacional to found a rival weekly called Aktual, whose first issue was published in June 2011.

Nacional continued to amass losses and was discontinued after the issue no. 866, published on 19 June 2012. The Nacional brand and its archive have since been acquired by Berislav Jelinić, its former journalist, who re-launched the magazine on 9 December 2014.

== Political stance ==
After the year 2000, Nacional shifted its editorial policies to include more business and entertainment oriented content. By the end of its run, Nacional was similar in format and content to German-language newsweeklies.

Nacional was owned by its editors and journalists, Ivo Pukanić being the majority shareholder.

Vienna Capital Partners had a stake in the company.

== Pukanić assassination ==
Ivo Pukanić was assassinated by car bomb on 23 October 2008 outside the offices of Nacional. Niko Franić, marketing director at Nacional, also died in the explosion. Two others were injured.
