= Rade Rakonjac =

- Born: 1962; Ivangrad, PR Montenegro, FPR Yugoslavia
- Died: 2 April 2014 (aged 51); Belgrade, Serbia
- Occupations: Bodyguard, soldier

Rade Rakonjac (1962 – 2 April 2014) was the bodyguard of Serbian war criminal Željko Ražnatović, a close friend of the Zemun Clan mafia boss Luka Bojović, and a colonel in the Serbian Volunteer Guard. He was murdered in 2014.

Following the assassination of Serbia's Prime Minister Zoran Đinđić on 12 March 2003, Rakonjac was among those arrested during Operation Sablja. Although he had strong connections to the Serbian mafia, Rakonjac was never officially convicted of any major crime. His only charge during his lifetime was for the illegal possession of a firearm.

Rakonjac served as groomsman to Ražnatović during his 1995 wedding to Ceca.

== Murder ==
On 1 April 2014, Rakonjac was sitting in front of the cafe "Marika" in Belgrade near his home when a masked assailant fired at him from a moving vehicle. The car was later found burned in the Belgrade neighborhood Voždovac. Rakonjac, who was shot in the neck and chest, died of his injuries the following day at the Military Medical Academy. Two other people with ties to Arkan were also injured in the shooting: Goran Ristanović, a basketball manager, and Stojan Novaković, described by the newspaper Novosti as "Ceca's groomsman" in her 1995 wedding to Željko Ražnatović.

It was noted by regional media that Rakonjac was killed two days after the information about new evidence came to light that suggests that the 2000 murder of Željko Ražnatović ("Arkan") had a politically driven motive. A witness whose identity is not publicly known claimed that Arkan's murder was ordered by the Yugoslav government for Arkan's meetings with Western officials to overthrow Milošević. Police investigated whether this testimony had anything to do with Rakonjac's murder.

Rakonjac was buried 5 April 2014 in Belgrade's New Cemetery. The identity of his murderer is still a mystery as of April 2015.
