= Duga (magazine) =

Duga (Дуга, pronounced [ˈdǔːɡa]; meaning Rainbow in English) was a high circulation Yugoslav and Serbian biweekly newsmagazine, which was published from the early 1970s until the 2000s by the Belgrade-based BIGZ publishing company. It had a predecessor which was closed in the 1960s.

== History and profile ==
Led by Aleksandar "Saša" Badanjak, Duga magazine was launched by the same staff that had previously worked on the Eva i Adam (Eve and Adam) erotic magazine. Having reached a circulation of 270,000 copies in SFR Yugoslavia, with particular popularity in SR Slovenia, Eva i Adam was eventually shut down in the early 1970s by executive order of the City Committee of the Communist League's Belgrade branch amid public morality accusations of 'spoiling the youth'.

Just like at Eva i Adam previously, Badanjak assumed the editor-in-chief role at the newly-launched Duga as well. At its inception, the Belgrade-based biweekly magazine's initial circulation was around 90,000 copies.

Duga quickly became famous for opposition to communism, and interviews with Yugoslav dissidents. In SFR Yugoslavia, from the 1980s especially, the media freedoms existed that were unimaginable in other communist countries. Nevertheless, chief editors were often sacked due to publishing controversial material.

In the 1990s Duga continued controversial reporting, until Dada Vujasinovic was shot dead in 1994, possibly due to an unflattering article about the Serbian warlord and gangster Arkan. It also carried a column by Mira Markovic, wife of Slobodan Milosevic and sociology professor, that often had poetic reports about the seasons amid horrible events in the country, but also carried indirect announcements of high politics sackings in the government. Her column was printed in the magazine until 1997.
