= Assassination of Ivo Pukanić =

2008 murder in Zagreb, Croatia

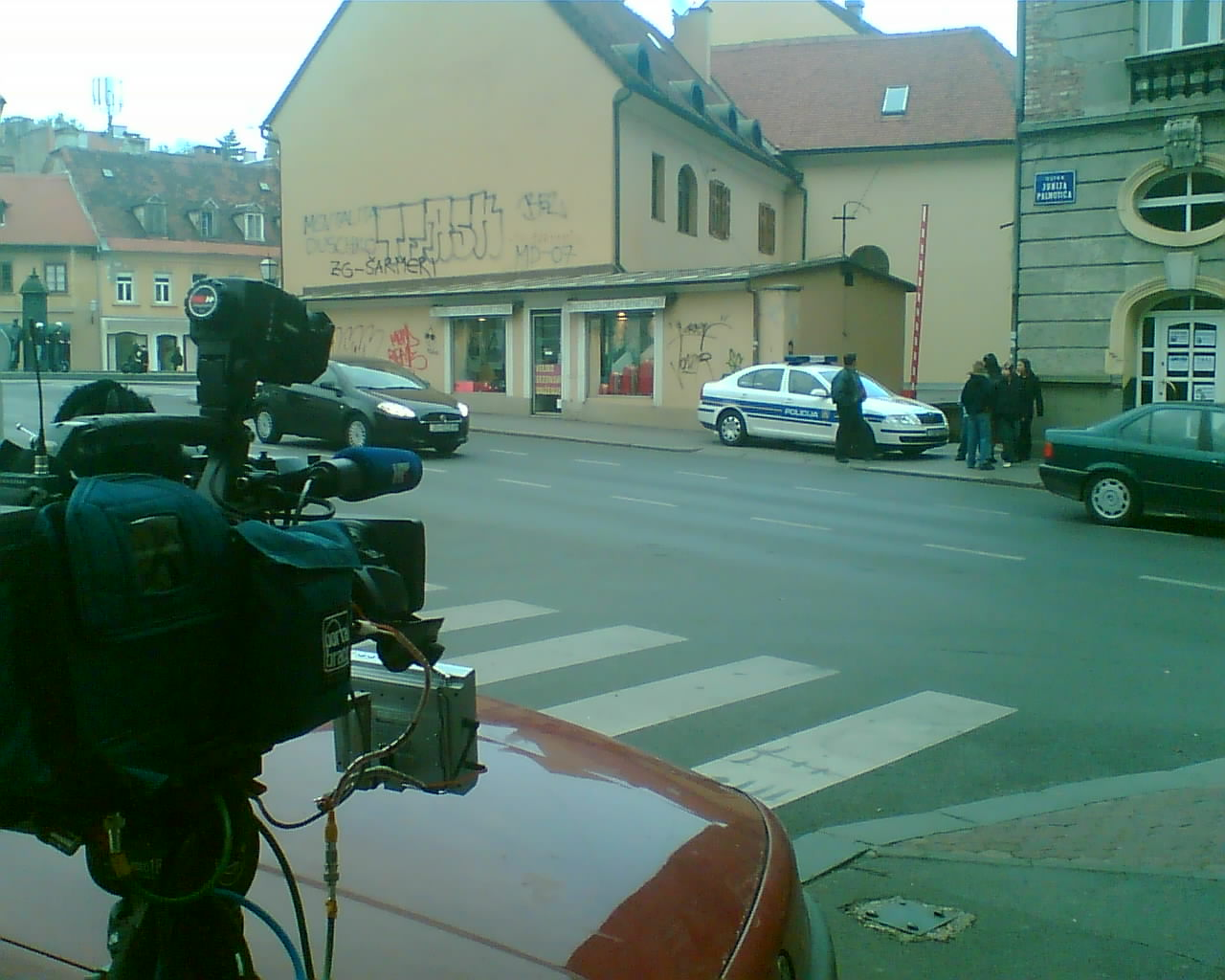
- The parking lot in Palmotićeva Street, two days after Ivo Pukanić was assassinated. Curious citizens and a TV camera still observe the location.
- Location: 45°48′48″N 15°58′57″E; Downtown; Zagreb, Croatia
- Date: 23 October 2008; 18:10 (UTC+2)
- Target: Ivo Pukanić
- Weapon: Motorcycle bomb
- Deaths: 2
- Injuries: 2
- Perpetrators: Serbian mafia Montenegrin and Croatian organized crime groups

The assassination of Ivo Pukanić happened on 23 October 2008 in Zagreb, Croatia, when a remote-detonation car bomb fitted on a motorcycle outside the Nacional newspaper's premises killed the owner of the newspaper, Ivo Pukanić, and Niko Franjić, its marketing manager, and injured two more people. The explosion occurred in the centre of the capital at 18:10 local time (16:10 GMT). Numerous arrests of suspects around the country followed. A subsequent police investigation accused Croatian and Serbian organized crime groups of perpetrating the bombing. Eight people suspected of having connections to organised crime groups were indicted. Six were later convicted over the murders with prison terms ranging from 15 to 40 years.

== Details ==
At 18:10 local time, Pukanić approached his Lexus LS 600h L with Niko Franjić, the Nacional director of marketing. According to first news report, a bomb placed in the trash can next to the car exploded soon after. However, an October 25 special edition of Večernji list dedicated to the bombing put the bomb on a motorcycle parked next to Lexus which then exploded before the two men had a chance to enter the car. Pukanić was instantly killed by the blast while Franjić remained alive for a few more seconds. Two graphic design students from a nearby school were injured by shrapnel. The incident happened on a parking lot in Palmotićeva Street, near Stara Vlaška Street and Josip Lang Square, only two street blocks east of the main Zagreb square, Ban Jelačić Square. Police immediately blocked the traffic around the site of assassination, causing immense traffic jams all over the city center. A man was seen running away from the explosion down Palmotićeva Street. He was described as being in his early thirties, wearing a baseball cap and running with no regard for traffic.

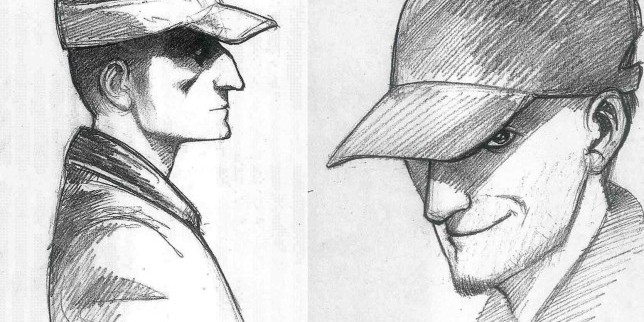
Forensic sketch of the suspect seen on the scene of the crime

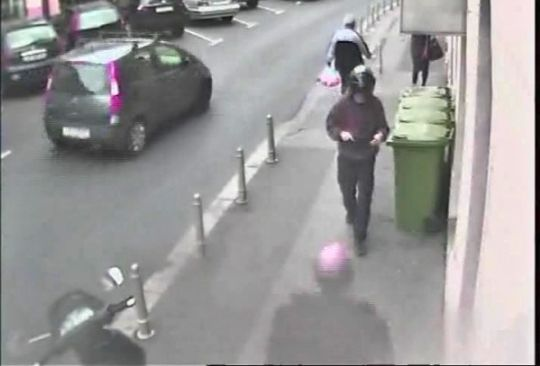
A man wearing a motorcycle helmet caught on CCTV footage was later identified as Željko Milovanović.

The police have reported finding security camera footage of a possible perpetrator parking the deadly motorcycle. CCTV footage of several suspicious events around the building on the day of the attack, including the footage of the explosion itself, was examined by court and publicly released in March 2010.

== Reactions ==
In a special press conference the Prime Minister of Croatia Ivo Sanader denounced the attack and declared that he would not allow "Croatia to become Beirut," though he declined a proposal for entering a state of emergency. He further stated that, "This is no longer merely a fight against organized crime... this is something all of us in Croatia will rise up against." Mirjana Pukanić, Ivo's estranged wife with whom he was involved with in a very public scandal earlier in the year, was shocked to find out about the assassination.

The editorial board of Nacional reacted by accusing the police of Pukanić's death by failure to provide police protection. They stated that Pukanić's round-the-clock protection by two police officers was lifted on August 1 not by Pukanić's request in his right mind, but under a pressure from the police. Pukanić allegedly received two death threats after the end of the protection and promptly forwarded them to the police, but they failed to act upon them. The redaction also condemned the prosecution office for investigating false accusations against Pukanić instead of concentrating on finding his April assailant. There were only informal speculations as to the motive of the assassin.

The media have called for a special anti-mafia operation similar to the Serbian Operation Sabre concluded after the assassination of the former Serbian Prime Minister Zoran Đinđić, which resulted in hundreds of arrests and a substantial decrease of Serbian mafia activities. However, there has been no news so far from the police department as to a possible operation. Such an action was already called for by the Zagreb's influential newspapers after the murder of Ivana Hodak, the daughter of a prominent Zagreb lawyer who was at that time defending a controversial former army general Vladimir Zagorec.

=== Mesić's testimony ===
President of Croatia Stjepan Mesić said the attack meant "terrorism has become a fact on the streets of Zagreb." He went on to state Pukanić feared for his life before the accident. According to Mesić's words, Mirjana Pukanić called Mesić to ask Ivo Pukanić to send her some money. Mesić called Ivo and, aside from Mirjana's request, inquired about the police investigation of the April assassination attempt. Pukanić replied that the police have not made much progress since the crime itself, but he added that he was in a great fear for his life. Mesić declared that he was not aware what were the reasons and who were the authors of the threats. He recommended the police to interrogate Mirjana Pukanić, although he did not publicly state what she would be able to say. He also said he would be willing to subject to a police interrogation himself. Mirjana Pukanić was vexed by President Mesić's recommendations and the claim about begging for Ivo Pukanić's money. She stated she has lived in a women's shelter for six months without money, and that she only asked Mesić to speed up the divorce process started by her.

=== State of emergency ===
In a special news conference following the assassination, Prime Minister Ivo Sanader at first declined the possibility of introducing a state of emergency. However, the following day Sanader approved the proposal and ordered 250 additional police officers to the city. He called the killing an "assassination" as he vowed to fight Serbian mafia crime that threatens his country's attempt to join the EU. Sanader said the police authority would be widened, trials would be speeded up, and a DNA database for convicted criminals would be created. During the state of emergency, the police would also have the right to confiscate illegally obtained property.

The announcement of the state of emergency was quickly followed by a release of a facial composite of the man from the crime scene and a large police operation, which resulted in 9 arrests in Zagreb and 20 in Rijeka during its first day. The chief of Croatian police, Vladimir Faber, stated all figures from Croatian underground connected to Pukanić will be interrogated.

== Background ==
2008 violence in Zagreb attributed to organized crime

April 9: Failed assassination attempt on Ivo Pukanić.
May 16: Building company director Igor Rađenović beaten.
June 3: Journalist Dušan Miljuš seriously beaten.
September 17: Businessman Josip Galinec seriously beaten.

The Croatian Journalists' Association has announced that the murder is the first of a journalist in Croatia since the nation's War of Independence. Pukanić has been known as a controversial figure, with close ties to the underworld and to politicians. Croatian media has reported he was a regular guest at all receptions given by president Stjepan Mesić. Pukanić's Nacional was known for uncovering cigarette smuggling schemes involving, among others, a Swiss-based Serbian tycoon Stanko Subotić and the current Prime Minister of Montenegro, Milo Đukanović. Italian Prosecutor Giuseppe Scelsi said that Ivo Pukanić and the murdered Montenegrin journalist Duško Jovanović of Dan, were among the most important witnesses in the investigation and that the Antimafia Commission will now have to archive the case. Another reason for archiving the investigation is the diplomatic immunity of Milo Đukanović.

=== Pukanić assassination attempt in April 2008 ===
Pukanić, an influential and controversial person in Croatian politics, was already targeted in a murder attempt on April 9, 2008, in western downtown Zagreb, near Franjo Tuđman Square. He was shot at with a silenced pistol at close range. Pukanić crouched as the perpetrator pointed his gun at him and successfully dodged the bullet, which created a hole in the window of a nearby gift shop. The perpetrator's gun subsequently jammed, enabling Pukanić to pull his legally-owned Glock 17 out of his bag. Pukanić fired a warning shot, causing the perpetrator to flee the crime scene. A facial composite of the perpetrator, who was unmasked and wore a dark knitted cap, was publicly released five days after the attack.

The police suspected the attempt to be a warning to Pukanić, intended to discourage him from certain activities. Police protection was assigned to Pukanić immediately following the event. However, it was lifted on August 1, 2008, just over two and a half months before the October 23 bombing, as there were no further threats in the months following the assassination attempt.

== Police investigation ==
The police released information that the possible assassin is Sretko Kalinić, a wanted executioner of the recently dissolved Zemun clan of Serbian mafia, who was in January 2008 sentenced in absentia to 40 years of prison in Serbia for eight assassinations and involvement in numerous other criminal activities including two abductions. He was spotted in Croatia the week before the bombing. There were reports that he was recently to the incident involved in other murders in Bosnia and Herzegovina. The police have also talked to Mirjana Pukanić, while Nacional editorial board refuted a claim that they planned to accuse her for the assassination. On October 27, Croatian police arrested many former police officers and members of the army in a countrywide action, who were suspected to be capable of producing such professional explosive device that was used in the bombing. On October 29, Croatian police arrested 10 people in direct connection to the murder whom the police official Krunoslav Borovec described as "dangerous members of a criminal milieu."

=== Serbian mafia ===
On October 30 police arrested five suspects aligned with the Serbian mobster Sreten "Joca Amsterdam" Jocić for Pukanić's assassination. The suspects were Robert and Luka Matanić, Amir Mafalani, Slobodan "Boban" Đurović and Milenko "Mića" Kuzmanović. Mafalani was arrested in his apartment and the other four were arrested on the Bajakovo border crossing, trying to escape Croatia.

The day before the All Saints Day police filed all points bulletins and subsequently arrested two known Serbian mobsters and criminals, Bojan "Bajone" Gudurić and Željko "Letač" Milovanović. Milovanović is known in Serbia for robbing a post office in Beočin (near Novi Sad, Serbia) in 2005. After the robbery he escaped the police. He was subsequently tracked and arrested in front of a Tuzla hospital. However, Milovanović made another spectacular escape a few days later, while being transported to a medical examination. Bojan Gudurić is known for having committed over 15 armed robberies all over Vojvodina while leading an organized crime group. His most publicized robbery was the robbery of the Ekspres Gas company in Novi Sad, where he and several of his masked accomplices forcibly took money from the company safe by threatening workers and staff by pistols.

=== Croatian organized crime ===
Days after the arrest and after a scandal involving Luka Pilipović, the attorney representing Matanić cousins and Mafalani, Robert Matanić offered a testimony to uncover the contractors of the assassination. He testified that Milovanović and Gudurić organized the assassination and that he, his cousin and Mafalani assisted them in preparations for the assassination. Mafalani allegedly obtained an apartment at the intersection of Petrinjska and Jurišićeva streets, a high-traffic location in the vicinity of the crime scene. Matanić was assisted by Velimir "Žvaki" Žak in obtaining several stolen cars and the bomb-fitted motorcycle for Gudurić and Milovanović. Gudurić, a known criminal monitored by the Balkans police forces, used a false name to rent the Jurišićeva Street apartment.

Matanić claimed he was at first unaware of the actual target and that he realized that Pukanić was the victim only a few days after Milovanović mentioned the target to him using Pukanić's nickname "Puki". Matanić also declared he was not present during the assassination, claiming a BMW 7 Series presentation in a car dealership in Folnegovićevo naselje as his alibi. Matanić also arranged the escape of Milovanović and Gudurić to Bosnia and Herzegovina. However, only Milovanović's escape was successful, as Gudurić took off a day later and was subsequently caught by the police.
