= Ljubomir Magaš =

Serbian criminal (1948–1986)

- Љубомир Магаш
- Born: 27 May 1948; Belgrade, PR Serbia, FPR Yugoslavia
- Died: 10 November 1986 (aged 38); Frankfurt, West Germany
- Cause of death: Assassination
- Other names: Ljuba Zemunac; Tomislav Spadijer; Duško Hudjec; Giovanni Angelis
- Height: 1.78 m (5 ft 10 in)
- Criminal charges: Rape, murder, racketeering, armed robbery

Ljubomir Magaš (Serbian Cyrillic: Љубомир Магаш; 27 May 1948 – 10 November 1986) was a Serbian amateur boxer, streetfighter and gangster. He was commonly known by his nickname Ljuba Zemunac (Serbian Cyrillic: Љуба Земунац, lit. 'Ljuba from Zemun').

A three-time convicted rapist in Yugoslavia, Magaš rose to become a Yugoslav mafia crime boss and one of the most influential figures in the Frankfurt underworld during the 1970s and 1980s. In 1986, he was murdered by rival gangster Goran Vuković.

== Early life ==
Young Ljubomir stayed out of trouble for the most part while living in Zemun. When he was eight, his mother moved the family to Belgrade, the Zvezdara neighbourhood where he attended Ćirilo i Metodije primary school. During his early teens, Magaš took up boxing at Radnički boxing club and became involved in streetfighting.

His nickname "Ljuba Zemunac" ("Ljuba from Zemun") came from his original neighborhood. After finishing primary school he enrolled in a trade school for auto repair, but never finished it. For a short time he worked at the IMT agricultural machinery factory in Dobanovci. In addition to street fights, he started making threats and vandalism.

== Criminal career ==
=== 1960s: Early days in Belgrade ===
For a 1965 robbery, 17-year-old Magaš was sentenced by the Belgrade district court and referred to an institution for juvenile offenders. A year later he repeated the offense and got sentenced again, this time by the district court in the Serbian city of Niš.

Violent by nature, Magaš continued brawling in public. One such fight broke out in 1967 at University of Belgrade's Faculty of Technology when Magaš beat up Vladimir Vučković, a student at the faculty. Afraid of yet another arrest and sentencing, Magaš escaped abroad for the first time—briefly crossing into Austria. He developed and fostered a reputation as a physically tough, vicious, aggressive, controlling, and vindictive criminal. Many other criminals feared him and sought his company and approval, but even that was no guarantee of protection as he often turned on those close to him.

In fall 1967, together with Rade "Ćenta" Ćaldović and Zoran "Robija" Milosavljević, nineteen-year-old Magaš was arrested on a rape charge. Ćenta and Robija got off due to lack of evidence, while Magaš was sentenced for rape to 2 years and 8 months in Sremska Mitrovica penitentiary. During his prison stays he established himself as a leader, regularly harassing, abusing and humiliating other inmates. One anecdote had Magaš forcing his fellow inmates to chew over dry and hardened bread so that he could make chess figures out of it. In his youth, he held pro-Yugoslav political leanings.

=== 1970s: Italy and West Germany ===
Magaš resumed his criminal activity upon his release in summer 1970.

In March 1971, he escaped to Italy with an associate, Danilo "Đani" Novaković, in order to avoid arrest over a car theft. Magaš's friend Ćenta soon joined him. Magaš settled in Milan, the gathering spot for Yugoslav fugitives at the time. His viciousness during armed robberies got him the attention of the Italian police, who exiled him to West Germany.

In West Germany, Magaš was not well-known. However, his physical strength, bear-like appearance, psychotic energy and thuggish ways quickly distinguished him. He settled in Offenbach am Main, essentially a suburb of Frankfurt, where the Yugoslav mafia operated out of a cafe called Žurnal. They further frequented hospitality establishments in nearby Frankfurt such as Jukebox Jumbo Jet cafe. At first, Magaš worked as bouncer, however, using the alias Tomislav Spadijer, he assembled a group of criminals specializing in armed robberies and racketeering. This marked the beginning of his criminal heyday — through fear and intimidation he led a group of associates that enabled him to secure a steady income stream. He trafficked young girls from Belgrade and other parts of Serbia to Germany, forcing them into prostitution.

In June 1974, Magaš was arrested for extortion, threats, and physical assault against a man who refused to pay the racket. Around this time Magaš was wanted in Yugoslavia for another rape. In September 1974 Yugoslavia sought his extradition from West Germany. German authorities refused the request in December. Yugoslavia submitted another request, while Magaš was arrested in Frankfurt again in May 1975 for using falsified identification documents, robbery and driving without a license. In September 1975, his extradition to Yugoslavia was approved. Magaš was sentenced to 4 and a half years.

In fall 1978, Magaš committed yet another rape and fled to Frankfurt where he lived as Giovanni Angelis. On 27 October 1978, Magaš was suspected of taking part in the murder of Veljko Krivokapić aka Velja Crnogorac. Apparently, Crnogorac had a row with Ćenta over gambling debts, which Ćenta settled by killing Velja with the help of Magaš and Jusuf "Jusa" Bulić.

While Magaš operated in Frankfurt, Ćenta did the same in Stuttgart. Other established Yugoslavia criminals such as Đorđe Božović aka Giška, Željko Ražnatović aka Arkan and Danilo Novaković aka Đani kept in touch with Magaš, especially when crimes were afoot. According to journalist sources, in the 1970s, Magaš started working with Yugoslav State Security (UDBA).

=== 1980s ===
In January 1980, an international arrest warrant got issued in connection to the 1978 Budva rape charge. Acting upon the international warrant, West German authorities arrested Magaš, extraditing him to Yugoslavia on 20 February 1981. After standing trial before the Titograd district court, he got sentenced to 5 years. On appeal, the case went to the Yugoslav Supreme Court, which ordered a re-trial. In October 1982 having already served 20 months, Magaš was granted bail. He ended up returning to West Germany and crime.

In 1983, Magaš was among some twenty individuals that got arrested on extortion, blackmail and armed robbery charges, part of a sweeping action by the West German police. The police case against Magaš proved weak; instead of putting him away, it only managed to embolden rival Yugoslav gangsters within Frankfurt's underworld seeking to challenge Magaš's rule over the city. One candidate was twenty-something hustler and thug Goran Vuković. He began committing crimes independently such as robbing a jewellery shop without Magaš's permission.

Magaš found out and in January 1985 Magaš and his associates Slobodan "Cane" Savić and Vlada Bačar attempted to kill Vuković and his friend Boris Petkov. Vuković was wounded by Savić. German police arrested Magaš, but he was acquitted due to lack of evidence. Magaš used his influence around Yugoslav emigre circles to obtain favourable witness testimonies and reportedly even got football coach Fahrudin Jusufi to provide an alibi for his whereabouts on the night of the shooting.

On 10 November 1986, just before 10:30am, Magaš, Vuković and their respective entourages encountered one another in front of the Frankfurt court. Vuković pulled out a gun and shot Magaš twice in the chest. The German police arrested Vuković. Magaš succumbed to his injuries hours later.

== See also ==
- Kristijan Golubović, mobster and godson
