= Dada Vujasinović =

Serbian journalist (1964–1994)

- Дада Вујасиновић
- Born: Radislava Vujasinović; 10 February 1964; Čapljina, SR Bosnia and Herzegovina, SFR Yugoslavia
- Died: 8 April 1994 (aged 30); Belgrade, Serbia, FR Yugoslavia
- Education: University of Belgrade's Faculty of Philology
- Occupation: Reporter for Duga
- Website: dadavujasinovic.com

Radislava "Dada" Vujasinović (Serbian Cyrillic: Радислава "Дада" Вујасиновић, pronounced [rǎdislaʋa dǎːda ʋujasǐːnoʋitɕ]; 10 February 1964 – 8 April 1994) was a Serbian journalist and reporter for the news magazine Duga, published in Belgrade.

== Career ==
She covered the early stages of Yugoslav wars and frequently visited front lines, including the city of Sarajevo while it was under siege. In 1992 she announced that she would no longer report from battlefields because she could not bear writing about the destruction of cities and the killing of children.

She returned to Belgrade and started reporting on politics. One of her most famous pieces is a piece about Arkan, in which she describes how a criminal came to be promoted as a national prophet. The piece was written with much sarcasm and irony.

== Death and aftermath ==
She was found dead in her apartment on 8 April 1994. The police ruled it a suicide, but most evidence disputes this. She was active the day before and made many plans for the future. The diaries of Ratko Mladić mentioned that he knew who murdered Dada implying that it was Goran Vuković and Duško Malović. This may help reopen an investigation into her death. The Serbian government began a review in January 2013 of several suspicious cases involving murders of journalists in the 1990s, including Dada Vujasinović, Slavko Ćuruvija, and Milan Pantić.

In 2014, Hleb Teater (Belgrade) created the performance "Dada - an Essay in Motion", based on Vujasinović's life, work and death.

== See also ==
- List of journalists killed in Europe
- List of unsolved murders (1980–1999)
