= Ivo Pukanić =

Croatian journalist (1961-2008)

- Ivo Pukanić
- Born: 21 January 1961; Zagreb, PR Croatia, FPR Yugoslavia
- Died: 23 October 2008 (aged 47); Zagreb, Croatia
- Occupations: Photojournalist, investigative journalist
- Writing career
- Period: 1983–2008

Ivo Pukanić (21 January 1961 – 23 October 2008) was a Croatian journalist. He was best known as editor-in-chief of the once influential Croatian political weekly Nacional. In 2008, Pukanić was assassinated by members of organized crime groups.

== Life and career ==
Pukanić was born in Zagreb. He graduated from the Faculty of Political Science at the University of Zagreb in 1983, after which he started working for Vjesnik publishing house as a photographer for two of their weekly magazines, Start and Studio.

In 1992 he started his career as a journalist and editor at the popular weekly Globus published by Europapress Holding. He left Globus only three years later in 1995 to start his own weekly publication, Nacional, where he held the post of editor-in-chief until 2000. That same year Pukanić received an award from Croatian Journalists' Association. He also later received an award for a 2003 interview with army general Ante Gotovina, who was at the time on the run due to accusations of war crimes by the ICTY.

== Assassination ==
Pukanić was assassinated on October 23, 2008, at 6.10 p.m. local time by a bomb planted on a motorcycle parked next to his Lexus LS600hL in the center of Zagreb, the capital of Croatia. He was killed alongside Niko Franjić, the Nacional marketing manager. The incident happened in Stara Vlaška Street, only two street blocks east of Ban Jelačić Square, the central square of Zagreb. It was caught on CCTV, with the footage showing the explosion moments before Pukanić and Franjić were about to enter the vehicle.

Nacional reporter Plamenko Cvitić was the first news reporter on the scene. The police immediately blocked the traffic around the site of assassination, causing immense traffic jams all over the city center. Prime Minister Ivo Sanader declined a proposal for entering a state of emergency.

Eight people, suspected of having connections to organised crime groups, were indicted. Six were later convicted over Pukanić's murder with prison terms ranging from 15 to 40 years.

Pukanić was survived by his wife, Mirjana, and daughter, Sara (born c. 1991).
