= Rade Kotur =

Serbian mobster in Sweden

Rade Kotur (born c. 1952) is a Bosnian Serb living in Sweden, where he has run a gambling empire and been involved in organized crime. Swedish newspapers have dubbed him "The Gambling King". In March 2009, he was sentenced to 14 years in prison for instigating a murder, illegal gambling, and various forms of tax evasion.

== Biography ==
Kotur was born in Draksenić village near Bosanska Dubica, PR Bosnia-Herzegovina, FPR Yugoslavia, and was educated as a tradesman (car mechanic) in his home country. In 1972, Kotur, in his early twenties, moved to Sweden. One of his interests was karate, and he has earned a black belt in the sport.

In the 1980s Kotur bought a café located in the Gothenburg district of Bergsjön, which he made into a pizzeria. This pizzeria was later transformed into a gambling parlour that formed the basis for his gambling business called RK Company, with the name taken from Kotur's initials. Throughout the 1980s and 1990s, Kotur built up the RK Company, which operated automated poker and slot machines in pizzerias and convenience stores throughout Sweden.

== Criminal activities ==
Kotur's gambling empire also included unlicensed, illegal gambling machines. Already in 1978, Kotur had been convicted of tampering with a slot machine. In 1990, 1993, 2002 he was convicted on illegal gambling charges and for breaking the Lottery Act.

According to the prosecutor, Kotur's gambling business had a turnover of at least 463 million kronor ($74 million) between January 1, 2005 and November 13, 2007. Kotur was being charged with grievous tax crimes and false accounting in an alleged attempt to shield from the Swedish Tax Agency hundreds of millions of kronor generated from his gaming operations. He was already on trial for his alleged involvement in the killing of Ratko Đokić, known as "The Godfather", who operated a rival gambling operation at the time. Nenad Mišović spoke against Kotur in the media, but in August 2008 at the court process against Kotur he protected Kotur in his testimony.

Kotur was arrested in the United Kingdom in November 2007, following a massive raid on his suspected illegal gambling operations, in which 400 slot machines were confiscated from 150 different locations throughout Sweden. Police succeeded to arrest him after a journalist from Swedish TV3 interviewed Nenad Mišović in prison and later journalists succeeded to find his phone number in London. He was then arrested by the police and extradited to Sweden.
