= Slobodan Šaranović =

Yugoslav and Montenegrin businessman

- Born: Слободан Шарановић; 1938; Danilovgrad, Yugoslavia
- Died: 11 March 2017 (aged 78–79); Budva, Montenegro
- Other names: Slobo
- Citizenship: Yugoslav, Montenegrin
- Occupation: Businessman

Slobodan Šaranović was a Yugoslav and Montenegrin businessman from Danilovgrad, who was arrested in July 2013 in connection with the murders of Miloš Vidaković and Nikola Bojović. He himself was murdered in March 2017. Šaranović had perfectly clean criminal records which was according to some sources thanks to State Security Administration.

== Family and early life ==
Šaranović's father Nikola was arrested by Communist forces after World War II while he was ill of typhoid fever. Šaranović would later state that his father had been sentenced to death by a Communist court and executed after his refusal to beg for pardon. Nikola Šaranović had a wife and two sons, Slobodan and Branislav. Slobodan was a student of medicine which was why one of his nicknames was Doctor. He was married to Gordana and had a daughter Milica.

== Conflict with Bojović's clan ==
The conflict between Šaranović and the clan of Luka Bojović began in mid-2009. On 27 July 2009 Slobodan Radonjić, whose godfather was Šaranović, left his home to meet two associates of Bojović. Since that day he is considered missing, though his family and Šaranović believed that he was murdered. The alleged reason for his murder was Radonjić's debt to Filip Korać, Bojović's closest associate, for 1 kg of cocaine.

Šaranović's brother Branislav was murdered in Belgrade in October 2009. At his brother's funeral, Šaranović publicly offered one million EUR for information about the person who paid for the murder of his brother. He even publicly offered the reward to people who killed his brother if they point to those who ordered and paid for the execution. The reward went unpaid because Šaranović received the necessary information without it. On 28 April 2013, Luka's brother, Nikola Bojović, as well as a purported accomplice, Miloš Vidaković, were killed in Belgrade. Šaranović was arrested in relation to these killings on the night of 24 July 2013.

== Death ==
Šaranović was killed on 11 March 2017; investigators believed he was killed with an automatic rifle.

== See also ==
- Serbian mafia
