= Montgomery Township, Pennsylvania =

Montgomery Township is the name of three places in the U.S. state of Pennsylvania:

- Montgomery Township, Franklin County, Pennsylvania
- Montgomery Township, Indiana County, Pennsylvania
- Montgomery Township, Montgomery County, Pennsylvania

== See also ==
- Montgomery, Pennsylvania, in Lycoming County
- Montgomery County, Pennsylvania
