= Denis Kuljiš =

Croatian journalist (1951–2019)

Denis Kuljiš (8 December 1951 – 18 August 2019) was a Croatian writer, entrepreneur and journalist.

Kuljiš was born in Split, Yugoslavia. He studied linguistics and sociology at the Faculty of Humanities in Zagreb. He frequently wrote for the press since 1972. From 1979 he wrote for communist youth magazine Polet and from 1980 for Vjesnik. He worked as an editor and journalist for Start, Danas and Studio. In 1991, Kuljiš and partners founded Media Press, a company which launched an independent political weekly Globus. He was an editor-in-chief for five years, and in that time, the company evolved into Europapress Holding (EPH), the largest press publishing house in Croatia. The company also started issuing Gloria and OK! magazines.

Kuljiš left the Europapress holding with stockholders of the Media Press and started issuing a political weekly Nacional. He led the magazine for two years, when the leadership was replaced. After that, Kuljiš started issuing a bi-weekly Ultra which was a failure. Soon, Kuljiš started the magazine Penthouse under the aegis of Slobodna Dalmacija and worked as an adviser for the EPH board.
