= Goran Vuković =

Serbian mobster (1959–1994)

- Vuković leaning against his BMW 850 CSi during the early 1990s
- Born: 1959; Belgrade, PR Serbia, FPR Yugoslavia
- Died: 12 December 1994 (aged 34–35); Belgrade, Serbia, FR Yugoslavia
- Cause of death: Assassination by gunshot
- Resting place: Belgrade, Serbia
- Other name: Majmun (Monkey)
- Occupation: Gangster

Goran Vuković (Serbian: Горан Вуковић; 1959 – 12 December 1994) was a Serbian gangster who earned his nickname Majmun (Мајмун, 'Monkey') due to his unique style of breaking and entering residential units: climbing and scaling the apartment buildings by utilizing balconies and window ledges in order to enter the private premises.

== Biography ==
He had spent a considerable amount of time in West Germany, before becoming the leader of the Voždovac gang back home in Belgrade. He garnered notoriety for killing rival mobster Ljubomir Magaš (aka Ljuba Zemunac) in Frankfurt, West Germany on 10 November 1986, in front of the local courthouse. For this "murder in defence", he received 2 years and 7 months prison sentence.

Magaš was unofficially proclaimed as the godfather of Serbian organized crime at the time. Vuković received a prison sentence of 5 years for the crime. He later returned to Belgrade.

After returning to Belgrade in 1991, he survived five assassination attempts. Such attempts included the bombing of his car as well as two policemen trying to kill him. Due to this, he concluded that the Serbian secret police had a hit-list, and that Romeo Savić was murdered by said police. The reason for Savić's assassination (according to Vuković) is because Savić was openly talking about police drug dealers. Vuković was mentioned in Ratko Mladić's personal diaries. Mladić wrote that Vuković and Duško Malović were involved in the 1994 murder of Serbian reporter Radislava Vujasinović.

In December 1994 he was shot in his car near the Yugoslav Drama Theater building by three masked assassins, who appeared out of darkness of nearby Manjež park and opened continuous fire from automatic weapons. Vuković and his bodyguard Duško Malović were found dead.
