= Darko Šarić =

Montenegrin drug trafficker (born 1969)

Darko Šarić (Serbian Cyrillic script: Дарко Шарић; born 1969 in Pljevlja, SR Montenegro, SFR Yugoslavia) is a Montenegrin drug trafficker.

== Career ==
Šarić was charged with drug smuggling (primarily cocaine) in April 2010. He is said to have planned the murders of well-known politicians and police officers. According to the police, the list included Serbian President Boris Tadić, Minister of Justice Snežana Malović, Secretary of State for Justice Slobodan Homen, and Special Prosecutor against Organized Crime, Miljko Radisavljević. The initial plans for the assassination attempts had been known since March 2010.

In October 2009, an attempt to smuggle around 2.7 tons of cocaine from South America was foiled. The criminal group led by Šarić had its headquarters in Montenegro. The police estimated the proceeds at five billion euros.

According to the State Secretary in the Serbian Ministry of Justice, Slobodan Homen, Darko Šarić earned one billion euros a year.

There were diplomatic rifts between Serbia and Montenegro surrounding the arrest of Darko Šarić. Montenegrin Prime Minister Milo Đukanović accused Serbian authorities of interfering with investigators' cooperation and thereby warning Šarić, allowing him to evade capture. The Serbian government, on the other hand, suspected Montenegro of granting protection to the fugitive.

In July 2012, the Belgrade daily Press reported another 10 million euros bounty for the murders of 6 current or former state and government officials, whom Šarić blamed for the collapse of the drug trafficking operation he set up.

At the beginning of 2014, Šarić was located in South America by the Serbian secret service BIA and arrested in a joint action by the Serbian and Montenegrin police after an international arrest warrant had been issued for him. He was taken to Montenegro on March 18 and finally to the Serbian capital, Belgrade, where he was due to face trial. Šarić's assets were confiscated.

In 2018, Darko Šarić was sentenced to 15 years in prison for drug trafficking. In 2020, he received an additional 9 years in prison for money laundering.
