= Ratko Đokić =

Montenegrin-Swedish organized crime figure

- Paткo Ђокић
- Born: 1948 or 1949; Podgorica, Socialist Republic of Montenegro
- Died: 5 May 2003 (aged 54); Skärholmen, Stockholm, Sweden
- Cause of death: Drive-by shooting
- Other names: "Cobra" "Cigarette king"

Ratko "Cobra" Đokić (Serbian Cyrillic: Paткo Ђокић; died 5 May 2003) was a Montenegrin-Swedish mob boss, a leader of the so-called "Yugo Mafia" or Yugoslavian Brotherhood, composed of Yugoslavs in Sweden. He owned a boxing gym in a suburb of Stockholm. He was killed in May 2003.

== Life ==
He was born into a Serbian Orthodox, Montenegrin family, during the late 1940s in Titograd, Socialist Republic of Montenegro. He was the maternal cousin of Baja Sekulić, another businessman involved in cigarette smuggling. He was a supporter of Momir Bulatović. Đokić grew up in Titograd where he earned reputation as a car racing enthusiast. He left for Sweden in 1970's where he started his criminal career. As many Yugoslav gangsters, he was employed by the Yugoslav SDB for the purpose of eliminating political dissidents. His name was often connected to the assassination of Stjepan Đureković, some leaked documents even suggesting he killed him personally with a sword, although no formal charges were ever made.

Đokić returned to Yugoslavia in the 1980's where he set up legal business as a high-rolling night club owner on Montenegrin littoral. He entered Yugoslav socialite circles, his relationship with Izolda Barudžija being highly covered in media. He organised an infamous illegal fight in his private house between "Giška" and "Jokso", the two strongest figures of the Yugoslav underworld. Towards the end of the 1980's he set up a private security company in Dubrovnik, often providing bodyguards for the elite vacationing there. Croatian intelligence suspected him of being contracted for the assassination of politician Franjo Tuđman in 1990 together with Željko Ražnatović Arkan. Đokić owned an apartment in Zagreb, which was supposed to serve as the base of operations. However, the operation was abandoned, and Đokić then split parts with Arkan, with whom he closely operated previously.

The beginning of the Yugoslav Wars prompted him to leave Croatia and settle in Montenegro again, where he became highly involved in state-operated cigarettes smuggling. During the highly controversial Montenegrin presidential election in 1997 he openly supported former president Bulatović. After Bulatović lost, he was tipped off by his contacts in the police that the political climate was not warm for him anymore, so he reallocated yet again to Stockholm.

On 4 February 1998, his close associate Dragan "Jokso" Joksović was assassinated at the Solvalla race track. The hit man is a 20-year-old Finnish immigrant, hired by a former associate Dragan "Kova" Kovač. On 9 July 1998, Kova was killed with 40 bullets outside a Stockholm restaurant in broad day light. His daughter Aleksandra married Milan Sevo, a mobster dubbed the new figurehead of the Mafia after Jokso's assassination.

=== Feud with Rade Kotur ===
Đokić acted as a protector to Kotur's rivals, he also helped businesses removing RKC gambling machines. Kotur suspected that Đokić had earlier been involved in the shootings at the villa of Kotur.

== Death ==
Ratko Đokić was shot dead on 5 May 2003, as he left his boxing club in Skärholmen Centrum, located in southern Stockholm. The getaway car, a gold-colored Mercedes, was stolen in the Stockholm area on 21 April and was found abandoned in Fruängen on the same day as the murder. The murder remains unsolved.

== See also ==
- Serbian Brotherhood
- Serbian mafia
