= Vojislav Stanimirović (criminal) =

Serbian-born American (1937–2022)

- Born: 19 March 1937; Kingdom of Yugoslavia
- Died: 13 June 2022 (aged 85); Novi Sad, Vojvodina, Serbia
- Citizenship: American
- Occupations: Reformed criminal, writer, journalist and artist
- Relatives: Pavle Stanimirović (son)
- Writing career
- Period: 1937–2022
- Subject: Crime

Vojislav Stanimirović (19 March 1937 – 13 June 2022) was a Serbian-born American journalist and one-time crime figure, most famous for his leading role in the Vizcaya Heist. He emigrated to the United States in 1952. Stanimirović was also later involved with YACS and the Pink Panthers among Serbian mafia figures. He is the father of Pavle Stanimirović. He died of mesothelioma on June 13, 2022 in Novi Sad, Serbia.

== The Vizcaya Heist ==
On 22 March 1971, three individuals from New York City raided the Villa Vizcaya in Miami and stole approximately $1,500,000 in artwork and silver items, some of which were of historical value. This trio of reputed jewel thieves was arrested on 25 March 1971.

The New York Police Department raided the luxurious Manhattan apartment of Stanimirović and his wife Branka, and arrested them. The couple's accomplice, Aleksandar Karanović, was also arrested, and all three were charged with suspicion of stolen property and possession of a dangerous weapon.

From the Stanimirovićs' apartment approximately $250,000 of the stolen goods was recovered. Sergeant Connolly stated that included in the theft was a silver bowl that once belonged to Napoleon Bonaparte and was virtually priceless. According to Connolly, the three perpetrators had been under surveillance for four months for unrelated jewel burglaries that they had carried out in the Manhattan Diamond District. NYPD Captain Thomas Kissane said that the vast majority of the precious items stolen from the Vizcaya have never been recovered.
