= Kavač =

Kavač Кавач
- Village
- Location within Montenegro
- Coordinates: 42.410427°N 18.749753°E
- Country: Montenegro
- Region: Coastal
- Municipality: Kotor

Population (2011)
  - Total: 671
- Time zone: UTC+1 (CET)
  - Summer (DST): UTC+2 (CEST)

Kavač (Montenegrin: Кавач) is a village in the municipality of Kotor, Montenegro.

== Demographics ==
According to the 2011 census, its population was 671.

Ethnicity in 2011
Ethnicity	Number	Percentage
Montenegrins	248	37.0%
Serbs	184	27.4%
Croats	93	13.9%
Egyptians	41	6.1%
other/undeclared	105	15.6%
Total	671	100%
