= Drug cartel =

Group drug trafficking operations

A drug cartel is a criminal organization composed of independent drug lords who collude with each other in order to improve their profits and dominate the illegal drug trade. Drug cartels form with the purpose of controlling the supply of the illegal drug trade and maintaining prices at a high level. The formations of drug cartels are common in Latin American countries. Rivalries between multiple drug cartels cause them to wage turf wars against each other. The term "narcotics cartel" is sometimes used to describe an organization that sells and trafficks narcotics (defined as substances that are illegal, such as cocaine in most places), but this term is not always used accurately as cartels can traffick eg. marijuana in jurisdictions where it is not illegal.

== Structure ==
=== Scouts (Falcons) ===
Considered as the "eyes and ears" of the streets, the "falcons" are the lowest rank in any drug cartel in Latin America. They are scouts, who are responsible for conducting reconnaissance, such as reporting the activities of the police, the military and rival groups.

=== Hitmen ===
The armed group within the drug cartel, responsible for carrying out assassinations, kidnappings, thefts and extortions, operating protection rackets, as well as defending their plaza (turf) from rival groups, law enforcement and the military.

=== Lieutenants ===
The second highest position in the drug cartel organization, responsible for supervising the hitmen and falcons within their own territory. They are allowed to carry out low-profile murders without permission from their bosses.

=== Drug lords ===
Drug lords are the highest position in any drug cartel, responsible for supervising the entire drug industry, appointing territorial leaders, making alliances, in addition to planning high-profile murders.

=== Other roles ===
There are other operating groups within the drug cartels. For example, the drug producers and suppliers, although not considered in the basic structure, are critical operators of any drug cartel, along with the smugglers, distributors, sales representatives, accountants and money launderers. Furthermore, the arms suppliers operate in a completely different circle; they are technically not considered part of the cartel's logistics.

== Africa ==
- Cape Verdean organized crime
- Mungiki
- Organized crime in Nigeria
  - Confraternities in Nigeria
    - Black Axe (organized crime group)
  - Anini gang
- Mai-Mai militia gangs
- Moroccan hashish smugglers
  - Ahmed organization

== Americas ==
=== North America ===
==== Canada ====
- Rivard organization
- Red Scorpions
- Bacon Brothers
- United Nations gang
- Montreal
  - West End Gang
  - Blass gang
  - Dubois Brothers
- Indo-Canadian organized crime
  - Brothers Keepers (gang)
  - Punjabi Mafia ਜੌਹਲ ਗਿਰੋਹ (Canada)
- Canadian mafia families
  - Rizzuto crime family
  - Cotroni crime family
  - Musitano crime family
  - Papalia crime family
  - Luppino crime family
  - Cuntrera-Caruana Mafia clan
  - Perri crime family
  - Siderno Group
  - Commisso 'ndrina

==== Mexico ====
Mexican cartel headquarters

Mexican cartels (also known in Mexico as: la Mafia (the mafia or the mob), La Maña (the skill / the bad manners), narcotraficantes (narco-traffickers), or simply as narcos usually refers to several, rival, criminal organizations that are combated by the Mexican government in the Mexican drug war (List sorted by branches and heritage):

Mexican academic Oswaldo Zavala, in his book Drug Cartels Do Not Exist, argues that academics, officials, journalists and writers are mistaken to label the criminal gangs as cartels, noting that they do not meet the definition due to the competitive nature of the drugs trade, and the lack of hierarchal structure. He states that the Mexican state perpetuates the label to justify their militarised response.

According to some observers in 2010, Los Zetas instituted social media demonstrations of torture and sadism in their reprisals which changed the rules of the game among the Mexican cartels. The level of violence and social instability greatly increased during the presidency of Felipe Calderon. The Calderon and Foxe administrations worked closer with American law enforcement and utilized the military forces which led to some confusion among local law enforcement in public security and a variety of human rights abuses and corruption. The former head of Mexican law enforcement, Genaro García Luna, was sentenced in the Eastern District of New York on October 16, 2024 for his role in Sinaloa Cartel associated drug trafficking in the United States.

Note: As of 2020 the DEA considered the cartels of Sinaloa, Jalisco and Golfo-Noreste-Zetas to be the most influential cartels in Mexico.

- Sinaloa Cartel (Spawned from the Guadalajara Cartel)
  - Colima Cartel (members are now a branch of the Sinaloa Cartel)
  - Independent cartel of Sonora (was reformed in 2018 and is no longer a branch of the Sinaloa Cartel)
  - Los Ántrax (enforcer squad)
  - La Resistencia (Splintered from the Milenio Cartel; disbanded)

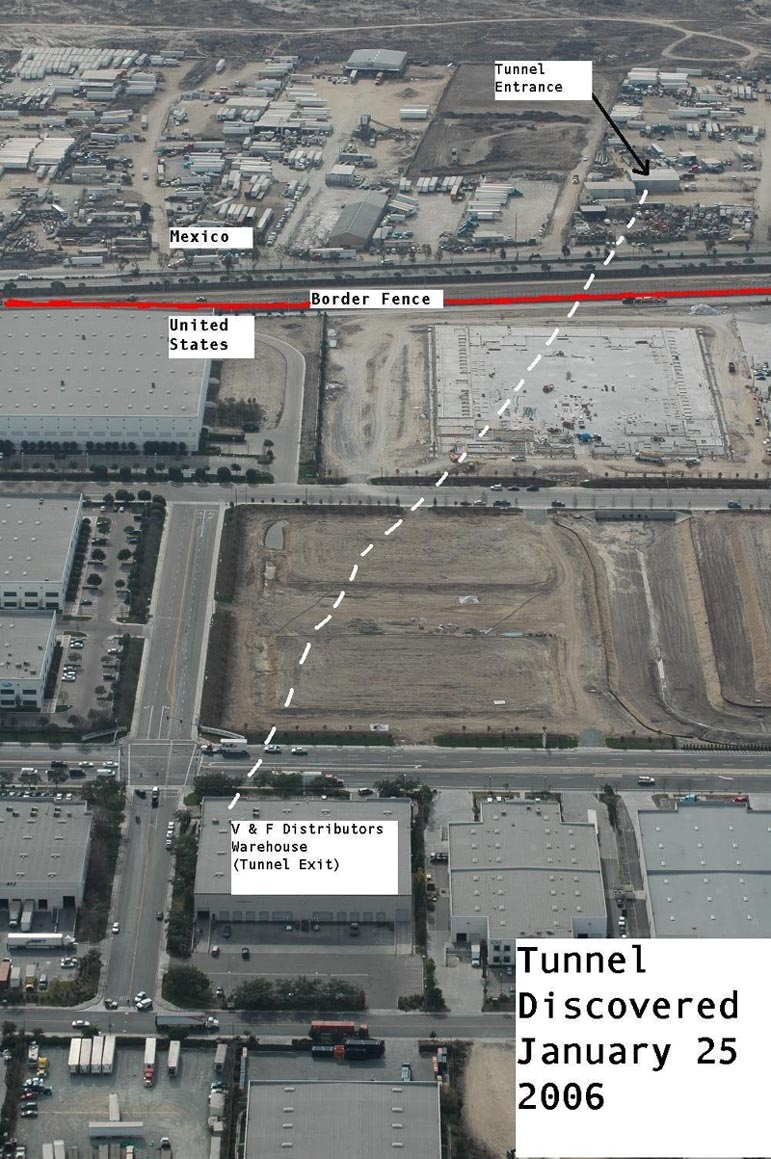
Drug trafficking tunnel under the U.S.-Mexico border used by the Sinaloa Cartel

- Jalisco New Generation Cartel (Independent remnants of the Milenio Cartel)
- Gulf Cartel (The oldest Mexican criminal syndicate, started as Prohibition-era bootlegging gang)
  - Los Zetas (Formerly part of the Gulf Cartel, now independent)
    - Zetas Vieja Escuela (Formerly part of Los Zetas, now independent)
    - Cártel del Noreste (Formerly part of Los Zetas, now independent)
  - La Familia Michoacana (Formerly a branch of the Gulf Cartel, then went independent)
  - La Nueva Familia Michoacana Organization (Splintered from La Familia Cartel)
  - Knights Templar Cartel (Splintered from La Familia Cartel)
  - Los Negros (Beltran-Leyva enforcement squad; disbanded)
  - South Pacific Cartel (branch of the Beltran Leyva Cartel in Morelos)
  - Independent Cartel of Acapulco (Splinter from the Beltran-Leyva Cartel)
  - La Barredora (gang)
  - La Mano Con Ojos (gang) (small cell of Beltran-Leyva members in the State of Mexico) (Disbanded)
  - La Nueva Administración (Splintered from the Beltran-Leyva Cartel) (Disbanded)
  - La Oficina (gang) (cell of the Beltran-Leyva Cartel in Aguascalientes) (Disbanded)
  - Cártel de la Sierra (cell in Guerrero)
  - Cártel de La Calle (cell in Chiapas)
  - Los Chachos (gang in Tamaulipas) (Disbanded)

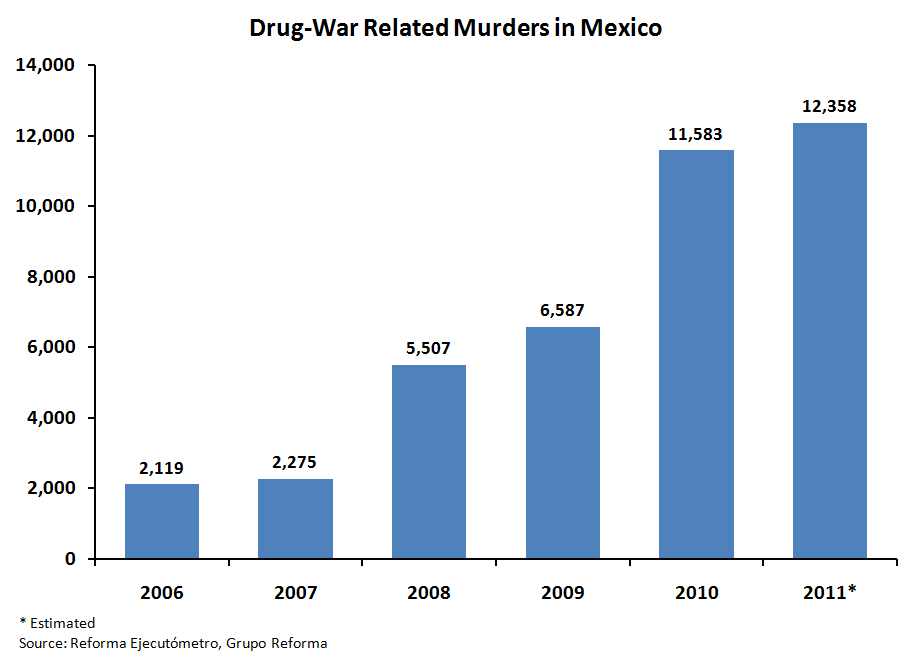
Drug war related murders in Mexico, 2006–2011

- Tijuana Cartel (Spawned from the Guadalajara Cartel)
  - Oaxaca Cartel (Was a branch of the disbanded Tijuana Cartel, its regional leader was captured in 2007)
- Juárez Cartel (Spawned from the Guadalajara Cartel)
  - La Línea (Juárez Cartel enforcer squad)
  - Barrio Azteca (U.S. street gang) (Allied with La Linea)
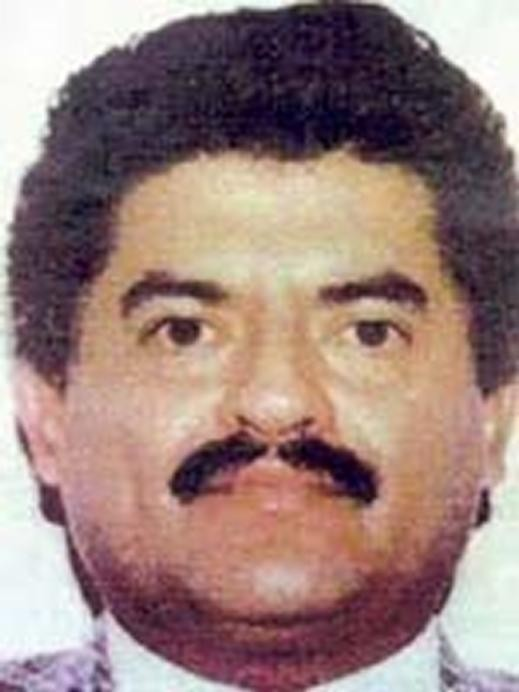
    El Azul was a Mexican drug lord. He was a former Mexican secret police (DFS) agent.
- Santa Rosa de Lima Cartel
- Caborca Cartel
- Lesser-known small-criminal organizations:
  - Los Mexicles (U.S. street gang)
  - Los Texas (street gang) (disbanded)
- Government officials: Other organizations that have been involved in drug trade or traffic in Mexico:
  - Mexican officials:
    - Municipal, state, and Federal Police forces in Mexico
    - Mexican Armed Forces (Army and Navy)
    - Mexico City International Airport
    - Club Xoloitzcuintles (football)
  - United States officials:
    - U.S. Customs and Border Protection

==== United States ====
Map of violent crime per 100,000 people in the US by state in 2016

The United States of America is the world's largest consumer of cocaine and other illegal drugs. This is a list of American criminal organizations involved in illegal drug traffic, drug trade and other related crimes in the United States:

- Polish Mob
  - Saltis-McErlane Gang
  - Kielbasa Posse
  - The Greenpoint Crew
  - Flats Mob
  - The Flathead gang
- Prohibition-era gangs
  - Galveston
    - Downtown Gang
    - Beach Gang
    - The Maceo syndicate
  - Shelton Brothers Gang
  - Sheldon Gang
  - Broadway Mob
  - The Lanzetta Brothers
  - Circus Cafe Gang
  - Wandering Family
  - Remus organization

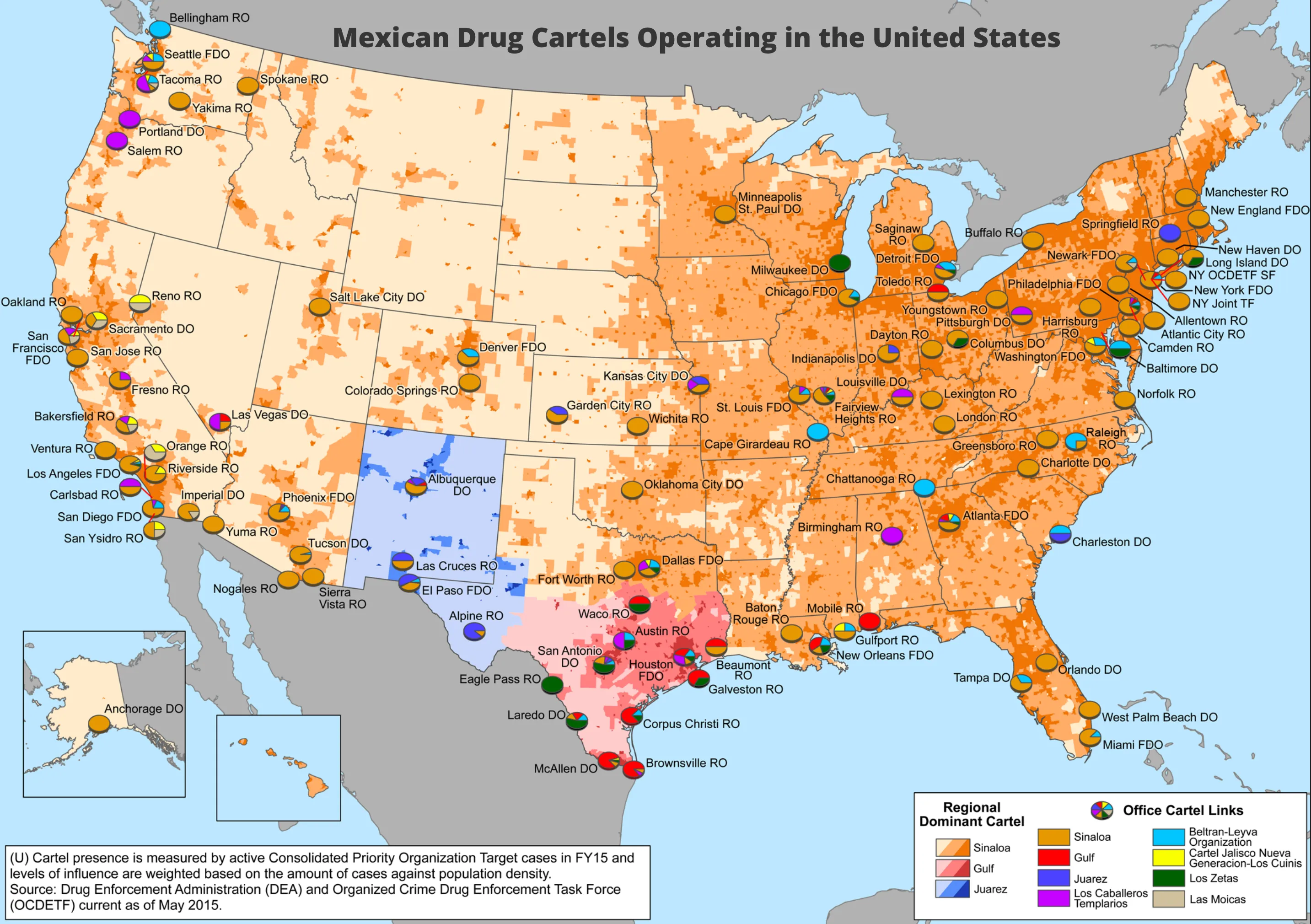
Mexican drug cartels operating in the United States in 2015

- Hispanic-American
  - Marielitos
    - The Corporation
  - Mexican Mafia
    - Surenos or Sur 13
  - Border Brothers
  - Paisas
  - Nuestra Familia
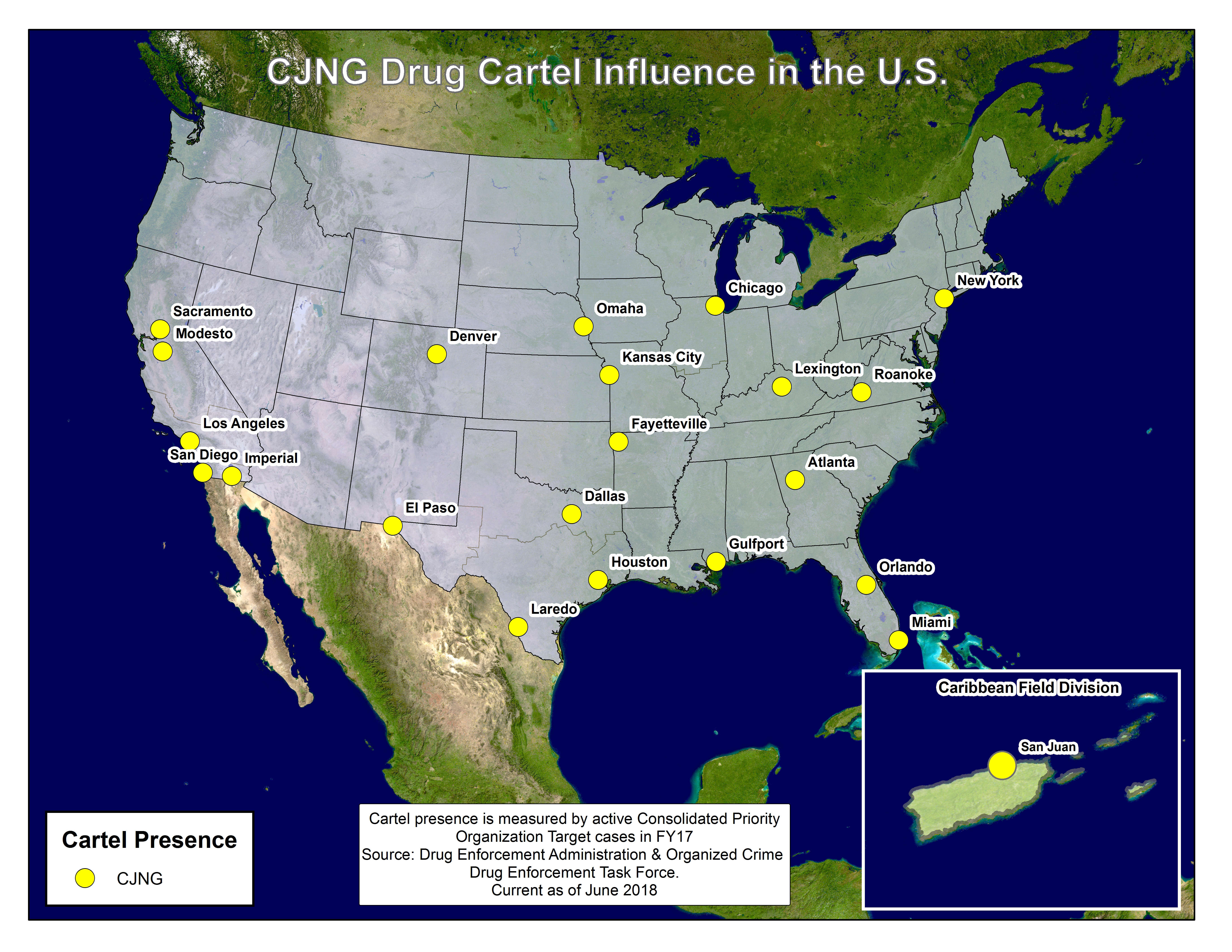
    Area of influence map of the Jalisco New Generation Cartel in the United States.
    - Nortenos or Norte 14
    - Raza Unida (RU)
    - Brown Pride or BP
  - Puerto Rican mafia
    - Agosto organization
    - La ONU
    - Martinez Familia Sangeros
    - Solano organization
    - Negri organization
    - Márquez gambling ring
  - Polanco-Rodriguez organization
- Los Angeles (See also Rampart scandal)
  - Nash gang
  - Wonderland Gang
  - Crips or Locs
  - Bloods or B Dogs
- Dixie Mafia
  - Cornbread Mafia
- Greek-American organized crime
  - Philadelphia Greek Mob
  - Velentzas Family
- Chaldean mafia
- Hawaii
  - The Company
  - Leota mob
- Wall gang
- Elkins mob
- The Chickens and the Bulls
- Binion mob
- Johnston gang

===== La Cosa Nostra =====
Italian immigrants to the United States in the early 19th century formed various small-time gangs which gradually evolved into sophisticated crime syndicates which dominated organized crime in America for several decades. Although government crackdowns and a less-tightly knit Italian-American community have largely reduced their power, they remain an active force in the underworld.

===== Active crime families =====
- American Mafia
- The Commission
- The Five Families of New York City
  - Bonanno
    - Indelicato crew
    - The Motion Lounge Crew
  - Colombo
    - Scarpa crew
  - Genovese
    - 116th Street Crew
    - Greenwich Village Crew
    - New Jersey Crew
  - Gambino
    - Ozone Park Boys
    - DeMeo crew
    - Baltimore Crew
    - South Florida faction
    - New Jersey faction
    - The Bergin Crew
    - Cherry Hill Gambinos
  - Lucchese
    - The Jersey Crew
    - The Vario Crew
    - 107th Street gang
- Magaddino crime family
- DeCavalcante crime family
- The Chicago Outfit (see also Unione Siciliane)
  - Las Vegas crew (defunct)
- Philadelphia crime family
- Pittsburgh crime family
- Patriarca crime family
  - Angiulo Brothers crew
- Cleveland crime family
- Los Angeles crime family
- Kansas City crime family
- Trafficante crime family
- Detroit Partnership
- Milwaukee crime family
- New Orleans crime family

===== Defunct mafia families =====
- Morello crime family
- Genna crime family
- Porrello crime family
- St. Louis crime family
- Rochester Crime Family
- Bufalino crime family
- Dallas crime family
- Denver crime family
- San Francisco crime family
- San Jose crime family
- Seattle crime family
- Omaha crime family
- Licavoli Mob
- Cardinelli gang
- New York Camorra
- East Harlem Purple Gang
- National Crime Syndicate
  - Seven Group
  - Murder, Inc.

===== Jewish mafia =====
- New York City
  - Schultz gang
  - The Bugs and Meyer Mob
  - Shapiro Brothers
  - Yiddish Black Hand
  - Rothstein organization
  - Kaplan gang
  - Rosenzweig gang
- Boston
  - 69th Street Gang
  - Sagansky organization
  - Solomon organization
- Los Angeles
  - Mickey Cohen gang (mix between Jewish and Italian members)
- The Purple Gang
- Zwillman gang
- Kid Cann's gang
- Birger mob
- Cleveland Syndicate

===== African-American organized crime =====
- New York City
  - The Council
  - Harlem numbers racket
  - Bumpy Johnson gang
  - Supreme Team
  - The Bebos
  - The Country Boys
  - Matthews Organization
- The Family
- Detroit
  - Black Mafia Family
  - Young Boys, Inc.
  - Chambers Brothers
- Philadelphia
  - Black Mafia
  - Junior Black Mafia
- Oakland, California
  - 69 Mob
- Baltimore
  - Williams organization (drug trafficking)
- Washington, D.C.
  - Rayful Edmond organization
- Chicago
  - Theodore Roe's gambling ring
  - Stokes organization
- Atlantic City
  - Aso Posse
- Miami
  - Miami Boys
- Rosemond Organization

===== Irish Mob =====
- Prohibition-era Chicago gangs
  - North Side Gang
  - James Patrick O'Leary organization
  - John Patrick Looney gang
  - Valley Gang
  - Ragen's Colts
  - Touhy gang
- Boston
  - Mullen Gang
  - Winter Hill Gang
  - Gustin Gang
  - Charlestown Mob
  - Killeen gang
- Danny Hogan's gang
- Danny Walsh gang
- Tom Dennison empire
- Danny Greene's Celtic Club
- Nucky Johnson's Organization
- K&A Gang
- Enright gang
- New York
  - Dwyer gang
  - The Westies
  - White Hand Gang
  - Higgins gang
- St Louis
  - Hogan Gang
  - Egan's Rats

=== Caribbean ===
- Chadee gang (Trinidad and Tobago)
- Jamaican Yardies & Posses
  - Shower Posse
  - POW Posse
  - Tottenham Mandem
    - Star Gang
  - Klans Massive
- No Limit Soldiers (Curaçao)
- Phantom death squad (Guyana)
- Suri-kartel (Suriname)
- Zoe Pound (Haitian, see also Tonton Macoute)
- Dominican drug cartels
  - Paulino organization
  - Féliz organization

=== South America ===
==== Brazil ====
- Primeiro Comando da Capital, based in São Paulo
- Comando Vermelho, based in Rio de Janeiro
- Terceiro Comando, based in Rio de Janeiro (disbanded)
  - Terceiro Comando Puro, based in Rio de Janeiro
- Amigos dos Amigos, based in Rio de Janeiro
- Família do Norte, based in Amazonas
- Guardiões do Estado, based in Ceará
- Bonde do Maluco, based in Bahia

==== Bolivia ====
- Bolivian drug cartels (See also García Meza regime drug trafficking)
  - Chapare Cartel
  - La Corporación
  - Santa Cruz Cartel

==== Colombia ====
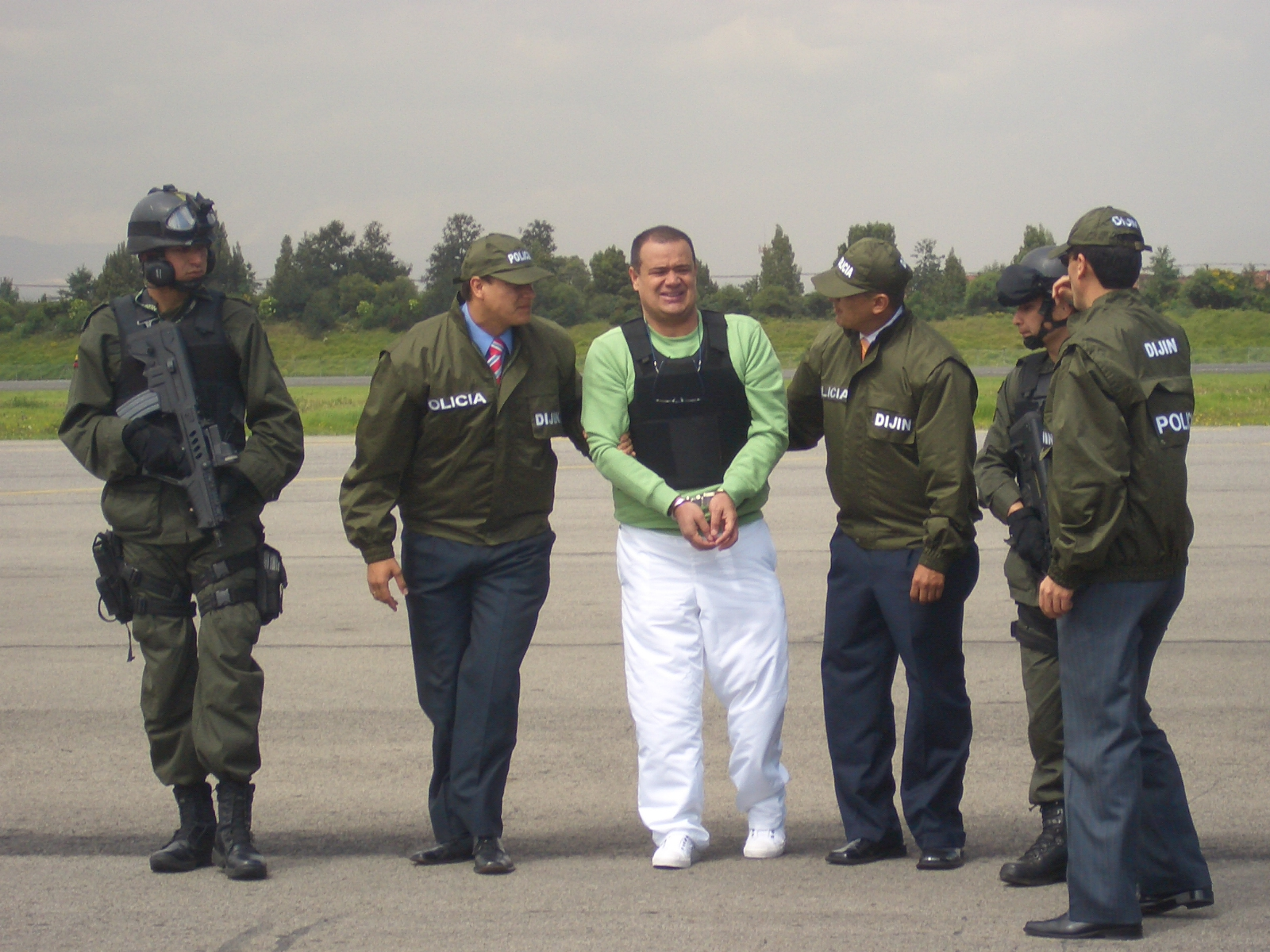
Luis Hernando Gomez-Bustamante, also known as "Rasguño", arrest performed by the National Police of Colombia

Colombia is the largest producer of cocaine in the world, and cocaine production in Colombia reached an all-time high in 2017.

Active Colombian drug cartels:

- The Black Eagles
- Clan del Golfo
- Oficina de Envigado
- National Liberation Army (Colombia)
- FARC dissidents
- Los Rastrojos

Historical Colombian drug cartels:

- Medellín Cartel
- Cali Cartel
- Norte del Valle Cartel
- North Coast Cartel
- United Self-Defense Forces of Colombia
- Revolutionary Armed Forces of Colombia

==== Peru ====
- Peruvian drug cartels (see also Vladimiro Montesinos)
  - Zevallos organisation

==== Ecuador ====
Active Ecuadorian drug cartels:

- Los Choneros
- Los Lobos
- Los Tiguerones
- Los Lagartos
- Los Chone Killers
- Las Aguílas

==== Venezuela ====
Historically Venezuela has been a path to the United States for illegal drugs originating in Colombia, through Central America and Mexico and Caribbean countries such as Haiti, the Dominican Republic, and Puerto Rico.

According to the United Nations, there has been an increase of cocaine trafficking through Venezuela since 2002. In 2005, Venezuela severed ties with the United States Drug Enforcement Administration (DEA), accusing its representatives of spying. Following the departure of the DEA from Venezuela and the expansion of DEA's partnership with Colombia in 2005, Venezuela became more attractive to drug traffickers. Between 2008 and 2012, Venezuela's cocaine seizure ranking among other countries declined, going from being ranked fourth in the world for cocaine seizures in 2008 to sixth in the world in 2012. The cartel groups involved include:

- The Cuntrera-Caruana Mafia clan moved to Venezuela, which became an important hideout as the clan bought hotels and founded various businesses in Caracas and Valencia, as well as an extended ranch in Barinas, near the Colombian border. "Venezuela has its own Cosa Nostra family as if it is Sicilian territory," according to the Italian police. "The structure and hierarchy of the Mafia has been entirely reproduced in Venezuela." The Cuntrera-Caruana clan had direct links with the ruling Commission of the Sicilian Mafia, and are acknowledged by the American Cosa Nostra.

Pasquale, Paolo and Gaspare Cuntrera were expelled from Venezuela in 1992, "almost secretly smuggled out of the country, as if it concerned one of their own drug transports. It was imperative they could not contact people on the outside who could have used their political connections to stop the expulsion." Their expulsion was ordered by a commission of the Venezuelan Senate headed by Senator Cristobal Fernandez Dalo and his money laundering investigator, Thor Halvorssen Hellum. They were arrested in September 1992 at Fiumicino airport (Rome), and in 1996 were sentenced to 13–20 years.

- Norte del Valle Cartel : In 2008 the leader of the Colombian Norte del Valle Cartel, Wilber Varela, was found murdered in a hotel in Mérida in Venezuela.
- The Cartel of the Suns According to Jackson Diehl. Deputy Editorial Page Editor of The Washington Post, the Bolivarian government of Venezuela shelters "one of the world's biggest drug cartels". There have also been allegations that former president Hugo Chávez and Diosdado Cabello being involved with drug trafficking.

In May 2015, The Wall Street Journal reported from United States officials that drug trafficking in Venezuela increased significantly with Colombian drug traffickers moving from Colombia to Venezuela due to pressure from law enforcement. One United States Department of Justice official described the higher ranks of the Venezuelan government and military as "a criminal organization", with high ranking Venezuelan officials, such as National Assembly President Diosdado Cabello, being accused of drug trafficking. Those involved with investigations stated that Venezuelan government defectors and former traffickers had given information to investigators and that details of those involved in government drug trafficking were increasing.

=== Central America ===
==== Honduras ====
- Matta organization
- Cachiros

==== El Salvador ====
- Mara Salvatrucha

==== Guatemala ====
- Los Huistas
- Los Pelones

==== Nicaragua ====
- Oscar Danilo Blandón see also Contra cocaine trafficking

== Asia ==
=== East Asia ===
==== Korea ====
- Korean criminal organizations (see also North Korea's illicit activities)

==== Japan ====
===== Japanese criminal organizations =====
The yakuza of Japan are similar to the Italian mafias in that they originated centuries ago and follow a rigid set of traditions, but have several aspects that make them unique, such as their full-body tattoos and their fairly open place in Japanese society. Many yakuza groups are umbrella organizations, smaller gangs reporting to a larger crime syndicate.

====== Active yakuza groups ======
- Roku-daime Yamaguchi-gumi 六代目山口組
  - Yon-daime Yamaken-gumi 四代目山健組
  - Ni-daime Kodo-kai 二代目弘道会
  - Ni-daime Takumi-gumi 二代目宅見組
  - Go-daime Kokusui-kai 五代目國粹会
- Inagawa-kai 稲川会
- Sumiyoshi-kai 住吉会
  - Sumiyoshi-ikka Shinwa-kai 住吉一家親和会
    - Kansuke Juni-daime 勘助十二代目
- Kobe Yamaguchi-gumi
- Matsuba-kai 松葉会
- Kyokuto-kai 極東会
- Dojin-kai 道仁会
  - Kitamura-gumi
- Yon-daime Kudo-kai 四代目工藤會
- Roku-daime Aizu-Kotetsu-kai 六代目会津小鉄会
- Okinawa Kyokuryu-kai 沖縄旭琉会
- Kyushu Seido-kai 九州誠道会
- Go-daime Kyosei-kai 五代目共政会
- San-daime Fukuhaku-kai 三代目福博会
- Soai-kai 双愛会
- Yon-daime Kyokuryu-kai 四代目旭琉会
- San-daime Kyodo-kai 三代目俠道会
- Taishu-kai 太州会
- Shichi-daime Goda-ikka 七代目合田一家
- Toa-kai 東亜会
- Ni-daime Azuma-gumi 二代目東組
- Yon-daime Asano-gumi 四代目浅野組
- Hachi-daime Sakaume-gumi 八代目酒梅組
- Yon-daime Kozakura-ikka 四代目小桜一家
- Ni-daime Shinwa-kai 二代目親和会

====== Defunct yakuza groups ======
- Kantō-kai 関東会
- Ni-daime Honda-kai 二代目本多会
- Yamaguchi-gumi
  - Goto-gumi 後藤組
  - Suishin-kai 水心会
- Ichiwa-kai 一和会
- San-daime Yamano-kai 三代目山野会
- Nakano-kai 中野会
- Kyokuto Sakurai-soke-rengokai 極東桜井總家連合会

==== Chinese ====
The Triads is a popular name for a number of Chinese criminal secret societies, which have existed in various forms over the centuries (see for example Tiandihui). However, not all Chinese gangs fall into line with these traditional groups, as many non-traditional criminal organizations have formed, both in China and the Chinese diaspora.

- Hong Kong-based Triads
  - 14K Group 十四K
  - Wo Group 和字頭
    - Wo Shing Wo 和勝和
    - Wo On Lok (Shui Fong) 和安樂(水房)
    - Wo Hop To 和合圖(老和)
  - Sun Yee On 新義安(老新)
  - Luen Group 聯字頭
  - Big Circle Gang 大圈
- Sio Sam Ong (小三王)
- Chinese-American gangs (See also Tongs)
  - Wah Ching 華青
  - Ping On
  - Black Dragons 黑龍
  - Jackson Street Boys 積臣街小子
- Taiwan-based Triads
  - United Bamboo Gang 竹聯幫
  - Four Seas Gang 四海幫
  - Celestial Alliance
- Mainland Chinese crime groups (see also Hanlong Group)
  - Chongqing group 重慶組
  - Defunct
    - Honghuzi gangs
    - Green Gang 青帮
- Triads in Cholon
  - Wu Bang

=== Southeast Asia ===
- Golden Triangle
  - Burmese drug cartels (see also Myanmar Nationalities Democratic Alliance Army)
    - Khun Sa cartel (see also Mong Tai Army)
    - Red Wa (see also United Wa State Army and National Democratic Alliance Army)
    - Hawngleuk Militia
    - Han cartel
  - Laotian drug cartels (see also Ouane Rattikone)
- Chao pho
  - Red Wa
- Filipino crime gangs (See also Abu Sayyaf and New People's Army)
  - Kuratong Baleleng
  - Waray-Waray gangs
  - Bahala Na Gang
  - Sigue Sigue Sputnik
  - Putik gang (defunct)
- Cambodian crime gangs
  - Teng Bunma organization
- Malaysian crime gangs
  - Mamak Gang
- Secret societies in Singapore
  - Ang Soon Tong 洪順堂
  - Ghee Hin Kongsi 義興公司
  - Hai San 海山
  - Wah Kee華記
  - Ah Kong 阿公

==== Vietnamese Xã Hội Đen ====
- Bình Xuyên
- Đại Cathay's mafia during the 60s
- Năm Cam's mafia of the 90s
- Khánh Trắng's "Đồng Xuân Labor Union", a crime syndicate under the guise of a legal entity
- Dung Hà's gang
- Vũ Xuân Trường's gang: a crime syndicate led by Vũ Xuân Trường, a government official and also a drug lord.

=== South Asia ===
- Mafia Raj
- Dacoit gangs

==== India ====
- Indian mafia (See also Insurgency in Northeast India)
  - Mumbai
    - D-Company डी कंपनी
    - Chhota Rajan gang राजन गिरोह
    - Gawli gang गवली गिरोह
    - Bada Rajan gang
    - Surve gang
    - Mudaliar gang
    - Mastan gang
    - Budesh gang
    - Kalani gang
    - Kala Kaccha Gangs
    - Chaddi Baniyan Gangs
    - Singh gang
    - Veerappan gang
    - Devi gang
  - Pathan mafia
    - Lala gang

===== Uttar Pradesh =====
- Ansari gang
- Yadav gang

===== Bangalore =====
- Rai gang
- Ramachandra gang
- Jayaraj gang

==== Sri Lanka ====
- Sri Lankan criminal groups

==== Pakistan ====
- Pakistani mafia (See also Peoples' Aman Committee, Tehrik-i-Taliban Pakistan, Muttahida Qaumi Movement and ISI involvement with drugs)
  - Chotu gang
  - Lyari Gang
  - Afridi Network

==== Afghanistan ====
- Golden Crescent
  - Afghan drug cartels (see also Taliban)
    - Noorzai Organization
    - Khan organization
    - Karzai organization (alleged)
    - Bagcho organization

=== Central Asia ===
- Uzbek mafia (See also Islamic Movement of Uzbekistan)
  - Rakhimov organization
- Kyrgyz mafia
  - Erkinbayev group
  - Akmatbayev group
  - Kolbayev group

=== West Asia ===
- Israeli mafia (see also Stern Gang)
  - Abergil Crime Family משפחת הפשע אברג'יל
  - Alperon crime family משפחת הפשע אלפרון
  - Zeev Rosenstein organization ארגון זאב רוזנשטיין
  - Palestinian organized crime (See also Abu Nidal Organization)
    - Doghmush clan
    - Popular Forces
- Turkish mafia
  - Crime groups in Turkey (see also Deep state and Yüksekova Gang)
    - Kılıç gang
    - Çakıcı gang
    - Yaprak Family
    - Topal organisation
    - Söylemez Gang
    - Arifs
  - Turkish organised crime in Germany
    - Arabacı clan
  - İmaç clan (Netherlands)
- Kurdish mafia (see also Kurdistan Workers' Party § Involvement in drug trafficking)
  - Baybaşin Cartel
  - Cantürk gang
  - Ay gang
  - Majid gang
  - Rahimpur gang
- Iranian organized crime (see also Jundallah and illegal activities of the IRGC)
  - Tahvili crime family
- Lebanese mafia (see also Lebanese Civil War militias)
  - Levantine crime clans
    - Miri-Clan
    - Al-Zein Clan
  - Ibrahim clan

== Eurasia ==
=== Russia ===
The term Russian Mafia, 'mafiya' or mob is a term for the various organized crime groups that emerged in this period from the 15 former republics of the USSR.

- Russian-Jewish mafia
  - Brighton Beach
    - Agron gang
    - Nayfeld gang
    - Balagula gang
  - Mogilevich organization
- Brothers' Circle (Existence is debatable)
- Russian mafia (See also Lubyanka Criminal Group, Three Whales Corruption Scandal and Sergei Magnitsky)
  - Moscow
    - Izmaylovskaya gang
    - Solntsevskaya bratva
      - New York branch
    - Orekhovskaya gang
  - St Petersburg (See also Baltik-Eskort)
    - Tambov Gang
  - Togliatti mafia
  - Uralmash gang
  - Lazovsky gang
  - Vladivostok gang
  - Kurganskaya group
  - Tsapok gang
  - 'Elephants' group
  - Kazan gang

=== North Caucasia ===
See also Caucasus Emirate

- Chechen mafia (See also Special Purpose Islamic Regiment and Kadyrovtsy)
  - Obschina
  - Labazanov gang

=== Georgia ===
- Georgian mafia (See also Mkhedrioni and Forest Brothers)
  - Kutaisi clan
  - Tbilisi clan
  - 21st Century Association

=== Armenia ===
- Armenian mafia
  - Mirzoyan-Terdjanian organization
  - Armenian Power

=== Azerbaijan ===
- Azeri mafia
  - Janiev organization

== Europe ==
=== Sweden ===
- Original Gangsters
- Fucked For Life
- Uppsalamaffian
- Chosen Ones
- Werewolf Legion
- Asir
- Vårvädersligan

=== Netherlands ===
- Organized crime in the Netherlands
  - Bruinsma drug gang
  - Holleeder gang
  - Moroccan mafia

=== France ===
- French Milieu (See also Service d'Action Civique)
  - Corsican mafia
    - Unione Corse
    - Brise de Mer gang
  - Les Caïds Des Cités
    - Faïd gang
    - The Barbarians
  - Wigs gang
  - North African Brigade (see also Carlingue)
  - Tractions Avant gang
  - Bande des Trois Canards
  - French gypsy gangs
    - Hornec gang

=== Greece ===
- Greek mafia

=== Ireland ===
- Ireland
  - Dublin
    - Cahill gang
    - Gilligan gang
    - Foley gang
    - Hyland gang
    - Dunne gang
    - The Westies
  - Limerick
    - McCarthy-Dundon
    - Keane-Collopy
  - Rathkeale Rovers
  - Kinahan Organised Crime Group

=== Spain ===
- Spain
  - Galician mafia
  - Romani clans
    - El Clan De La Paca

=== Poland ===
- Poland (See also Group 13)
  - Pruszków mafia
  - Wołomin mafia

=== Slovakia ===
- Slovak mafia
  - Hungaro-Slovak mafia

=== Hungary ===
- Raffael clan
- Sztojka clan

=== Czech Republic ===
- Mrázek organization
- Krejčíř organization

=== Italy ===
- Sicilian Mafia
  - Sicilian Mafia Commission
  - Mandamenti
    - See also List of Sicilian Mafia clans
    - Cuntrera-Caruana Mafia clan
    - Inzerillo Mafia clan
    - Corleonesi
    - Greco Mafia clan
    - Motisi Mafia clan
- 'Ndrangheta
- La Provincia
  - See also List of 'ndrine
  - Honoured Society (Melbourne)
  - Mammoliti 'ndrina
  - Bellocco 'ndrina
  - Cataldo 'ndrina
  - Commisso 'ndrina
  - Cordì 'ndrina
  - De Stefano 'ndrina
  - Pesce 'ndrina
  - Barbaro 'ndrina
  - Piromalli 'ndrina
  - Serraino 'ndrina
  - Siderno Group
- Camorra
  - Secondigliano Alliance
    - Licciardi clan
    - Contini clan
    - Lo Russo clan
    - Mallardo clan
  - Di Lauro Clan
  - Casalesi clan
  - Fabbrocino clan
  - Vollaro clan
  - Scissionisti di Secondigliano
  - La Torre clan
  - Polverino clan
  - Rinaldi clan
  - De Luca Bossa clan
  - Aprea-Cuccaro clan
  - Cesarano clan
  - Puca clan
- Sacra Corona Unita
- Società foggiana
- Stidda
- Mala del Brenta
- Banda della Magliana
- Mafia Capitale
- Sinti Casamonica clan
- Clan Spada di Ostia
- Milanese gangs
  - Banda della Comasina
  - Turatello crew

=== Balkans ===
Balkan organized crime gained prominence in the chaos following the communist era, notably the transition to capitalism and the wars in former Yugoslavia.

- Albanian mafia
  - Kosovan mafia
  - Albania
    - Gang of Çole
    - Gang of Gaxhai
    - Gang of Pusi i Mezinit
    - Lazarat marijuana growers
  - Rudaj Organization (New York City)
  - Gang of Ismail Lika
  - Dobroshi gang (International)
  - Naserligan (Sweden)
  - K-Falangen (Sweden)
- Bosnian mafia
  - Prazina gang
  - Bajramović gang
  - Delalić gang
  - M-Falangen (Sweden)
  - Dino and Tito Cartel
- Bulgarian mafia (see also Multigroup)
  - VIS
  - SIC
  - Karamanski gang
  - TIM
  - Naglite
  - Rashkov clan
- Serbian mafia
  - Arkan clan
  - Zemun Clan
  - Joca Amsterdam gang
  - Magaš clan
  - Giška gang
  - Pink Panthers
  - Serb mafia in Scandinavia
    - Kotur mob
    - Yugoslav Brotherhood
- Montenegrin mafia (see also allegations of Milo Đukanović's involvement in cigarette smuggling)
- Romanian mafia
  - Băhăian organisation

=== Great Britain ===
- London
  - Adams crime family
  - The Richardson Gang
  - The Firm
  - The Syndicate
  - Comer gang
  - Buttmarsh Boys
  - Interwar era mobs
    - Messina Brothers
    - Sabini syndicate
    - Hoxton Gang
    - Elephant and Castle Mob
    - Birmingham Boys
- Essex Boys
- Manchester
  - Quality Street Gang
  - Noonan firm
  - Cheetham Hillbillies
  - The Gooch Close Gang
- Liverpool
  - Curtis Warren's drug empire
  - Whitney gang
- Aggi Crew
- Glasgow
  - McGraw firm
  - Thompson firm
  - Delta Crime Syndicate
- Bestwood Cartel

=== Ukraine ===
- Ukrainian mafia
  - Donetsk Clan
  - Salem gang

=== Lithuania ===
- Lithuanian mafia
  - Vilnius Brigade

=== Estonia ===
- Estonian mafia/Obtshak
  - Linnuvabriku group

=== Transnistria ===
- Transnistrian mafia

== Australia ==
- Sydney
  - 5T gang (1985–1999)
  - Freeman gang (defunct)
  - Lenny's gang (1960s)
  - Mr Sin's gang
  - Razor gangs (1920s)
- Melbourne
  - Carlton Crew
  - Moran family
  - Williams family
  - Pettingill family
  - Richmond gang
- Perth
  - Salvator cartel

== See also ==
- List of Mexican drug cartels
- List of Mexican drug cartel figures
- List of Mexican gangs
- List of criminal enterprises, gangs, and syndicates
