= Kozakura =

Kozakura may refer to:

- Etsuko Kozakura (小桜 エツ子) (born 1971), Japanese voice actress
- Kozakura-ikka, yakuza group
- Kozakura class traffic boat, motor gunboat of the Imperial Japanese Navy
