= Gafur Rakhimov =

Uzbek- businessman, athlete and philanthropist

- Born: G'ofur-Arslanbek Ahmetovich Rahimov; July 22, 1951 (age 73); Tashkent, Uzbek SSR, USSR
- Known for: Sports
- Awards: Master of Sports

Gafur Rakhimov (Uzbek: G'ofur-Arslanbek Ahmetovich Rahimov) (born July 22, 1951) is an Uzbek businessman and sports administrator who was the president of the International Boxing Association (AIBA) for 20 months until his resignation in July 2019.

== Biography ==
Rakhimov was born July 22, 1951, in Tashkent. He took up boxing as a youth and later moved on to coaching. After Uzbekistan's independence in 1991, he set up several commercial enterprises, which included trading in both raw materials and finished consumer goods. In March 1991, he founded Agroplus, an export-import company, and was in charge of it from 1991 to 1993. He also became a prominent figure in Central Asian boxing. In 2001 and 2005 he was elected vice-president of the National Olympic Committee of Uzbekistan.

On 25 May 1998, Yuri Shchekochikhin accused Rakhimov along with KGB Major General Evgeny G. Khokholkov, who headed URPO in the FSB, and Salim Abduvaliev of very unusual activities.

According to Alexander Litvinenko, both Rakhimov and Salim Abduvaliev are closely associated with a Vladimir Putin organized narcotics trafficking network that is close to the Izmaylovskaya mafia (OPG) the Tambov Russian mafia (OPG), Evgeny Khokholkov (Russian: Евгений Хохольков), an Uzbek KGB who was head of FSB, Vyacheslav Ivankov (Russian: Вячеслав Иваньков) Yaponchik, who governed Uzbek networks in America, and Alimzhan Tokhtakhunov (Russian: Алимжан Тохтахунов) Taiwanchik, who governed Uzbek networks in Europe, with heroin from Central Asia including Afghanistan and cocaine from Colombia through the St. Petersburg's Sea Port (Russian: Морской порт Санкт-Петербург) to Europe. Robert Eringer confirmed this.

On 23 February 2012, the US Department of the Treasury put financial sanctions on Rakhimov and several other individuals, accused of being part of the so-called Brothers' Circle criminal organization. Nevertheless, Rakhimov has never been charged with any crime in any country. He has won defamation suits at the high courts in Britain, Australia and France.

Preceded by (Chinese Taipei) Wu Ching-kuo	AIBA President; 2017 – March 23, 2019; Retired	Succeeded by (Morocco) Mohamed Moustahsane (Interim President)
