= Vitali Dyomochka =

Russian mob boss (born 1970)

Vitali Yevgenyevich Dyomochka (Russian: Вита́лий Евге́ньевич Дёмочка; born 5 December 1970), also known as Bondar, is a Russian director, writer, and actor. Dyomochka previously was head of an organised crime group in Ussuriysk, Primorsky Krai; he subsequently dramatised his experiences in the TV series Spets.

== Biography ==
Although Dyomochka was an A-grade student, he was expelled from school and later college. As the Soviet era drew to a close, he started his criminal career collecting protection money from local clothing stores as capitalism started to take off.

Vitali was convicted of several crimes including extortion and shooting a rival gangster, and after his release from prison in 1997 became the head of the Podstava criminal group. The gang specialized in blackmailing money from passing drivers by setting up car accidents.

Dyomochka was also interviewed in the 2010 documentary Thieves by Law.

== Spets TV show ==
Unsatisfied with the way organized crime was depicted in film and television, Vitali set about creating his own TV series. Largely financed by his own money, the seven-part series finished production in 2003 and became a huge success, getting close to 100% ratings on a local television station. The series drew a lot upon Vitali's own experiences, such as when a driver he had attempted to blackmail turned out to be a judge. Over the course of the series ten members of his gang were arrested and one was murdered by rivals.

== Sources ==
- AmericanMafia.com article about Spets and Vitali
- Telegraph - Mobster turns from gunning down rivals to shooting TV series
- IMDB page for Thieves by Law
- Russian mobster shoots TV show, The Washington Times
- Pomerantsev, Peter (2015). Nothing is true and everything is possible: adventures in modern Russia. London: Faber & Faber. pp. 22–41. ISBN 978-1610396004.
