= Vladislav Leontyev =

Russian mobster (born 1971)

Vladislav Vladimirovich Leontyev (born July 5, 1971 in Gorky) is a Russian gangster linked to drug trafficking, embezzlement, fraud, extortion and car theft. In 2012 the Obama administration of the United States imposed sanctions on Leontyev as a central figure in a transnational crime gang called Brothers' Circle, along with six other men linked to various syndicates tied into the Circle, and Japanese yakuza leaders Kenichi Shinoda and Kiyoshi Takayama.
