= Spets =

Russian television series

Spets (Russian: Спец) was a seven-part Russian TV series that aired on Ussuriysk TV. It chronicled the day-to-day activities of a group of gangsters in Ussuriysk, a town in Russia's Far East. The show's writer, producer, director and star, Vitali Dyomochka, was a real life Russian mafia boss and the head of a podstava group. A lot of the events depicted on the show were based on Dyomochka's real life experiences, such as an incident where a blackmail victim turns out to be a judge.

The gangsters were played by their real-life counterparts and performed their own stunts. All the blood depicted was real. Reportedly, when there was not enough, Dyomochka would take a syringe and tap some of his own. Over the course of the series, a nightclub and casino were heavily damaged. Also during series ten gang members were arrested and another was murdered by rivals. The local police showed opposition to the show and refused to play themselves, and questioned and investigated Dyomochka several times over the production of the show.

When the series finished production in 2003, it became a hit on local television, getting around 100% ratings. However, the show also divided viewers, and raised controversy if the mafia should be allowed to profit from their crimes in this way. Dymochka, however, has repeatedly insisted he has not made money from the show, and rather did it to show people the real side of organized crime.
