= Salim Abduvaliev =

Uzbek businessman, athlete and philanthropist

Salim Kirgizbaevich Abduvaliev Салим Абдувалиев Кыргызбаевич
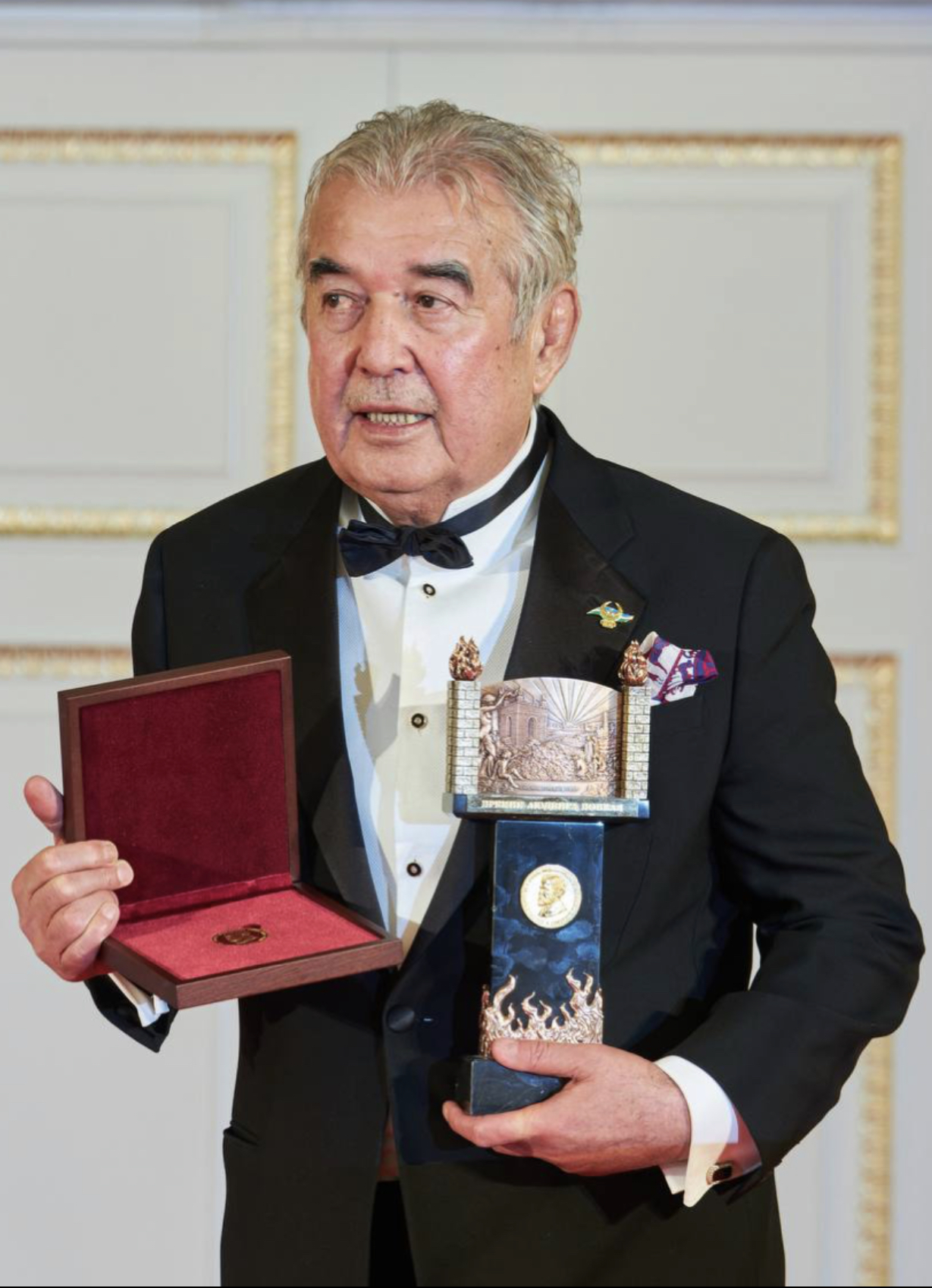
- Award ceremony for the "Ludwig Nobel Prize"
- Born: Firuz Shoazimi Tajik; 5 May 1950 (age 76); Tashkent, Uzbek SSR
- Occupations: Former Master of Sports; Film producer
- Children: Sardor Abduvaliev; Djasur Abduvaliev; Nilufar Abduvalieva
- Awards: Honored sports trainer of Uzbekistan; XVI Ludvig Nobel Prize

Salim Kirgizbaevich Abduvaliev (Uzbek: Салим Қирғизбоевич Абдувалиев, born 5 May 1950) is an Uzbek businessman and film producer who serves as the current Vice President of the National Olympic Committee of the Republic of Uzbekistan. In 2015 as film producer, he was awarded the "Do’stlik" State Prize of Uzbekistan and the "XVI Ludwig Nobel Prize" in 2022. He popularly is known as "Salimboyvachcha" and is alleged to have ties to the Brothers' Circle.

== Biography ==
Abduvaliev was born in May 1950 Tashkent city. His father was the collective farm chairman. After retiring from the sport of freestyle wrestling, he worked in a factory, then he became a trucker.

On 25 May 1998, Yuri Shchekochikhin accused Abduvaliev along with KGB Major General Evgeny G. Khokholkov, who headed URPO (Russian: Управления по разработке и пресечению деятельности преступных организаций (УРПО)) in the FSB, and Gafur Rakhimov of very unusual activities. (Note: From December 1997 to August 1998, MAKARYCHEV ALEXANDER KONSTANTINOVICH Alexander Konstantinovich Makarychev (Russian: АЛЕКСАНДР КОНСТАНТИНОВИЧ МАКАРЫЧЕВ) was the first deputy head of the Directorate for the Development and Suppression of the Activities of Criminal Organizations (URPO) (Russian: Управления по разработке и пресечению деятельности преступных организаций (УРПО)) in the FSB.)

In the 1990s and 2000s he was a partner of Michael Cherney on aluminum business, sponsored the participation of Anatoly Bykov with Boris Petrunin support in the elections in Krasnoyarsk Krai, Russia and is very close to Tevfik Arif.

Alexander Litvinenko stated that both Salim Abduvaliev and Gafur Rakhimov control the narcotics trafficking from Central Asia including Afghanistan and cocaine from Colombia to the Ismailovskaya mafia (OGP) which then moves narcotics using Saint Petersburg's Tambovskaya mafia (OGP) through the St. Petersburg's Sea Port (Russian: Морской порт Санкт-Петербург) to flood Europe with narcotics and that Vladimir Putin organized the network and is intimately involved in the trafficking. Robert Eringer confirmed this. Litvinenko stated that General Abdurashid Dostum (Russian: генерал Абдурашид Дустум) controlled 80% of the territory where opium poppies were grown in Central Asia including Afghanistan and that he works very closely with Salim Abduvaliev who is supported by numerous FSB officials.

According to Jon Purnell, Abduvaliev is the Uzbek "mafia boss" and "the boss of the criminal world" of Uzbekistan. Abduvaliev allegedly is the financier of Kamchy Kolbayev of the Brothers' Circle.

In 2006 he defended his thesis of Candidate of Economic Sciences on the theme "Management of social and economic development of municipal unions: generalization of the experience of Russia and the Republic of Uzbekistan."

However, after President Mirziyoyev began to implement anti-corruption measures, Abduvaliev fell from favor. In 2023, he was arrested and convicted of arms smuggling and sentenced to six years in prison. His business partner Kolbayev was shot dead by Kyrgyz police in the same year. However, in January 2025, Abduvaliev was released from prison due to health issues.

== Career ==
=== Sport charity ===
Abduvaliev is the President of the Wrestling Association of Uzbekistan. He sponsors the World Wrestling Championships, the international tournament "Grand Prix" cups of Independence of Uzbekistan in freestyle wrestling and others competitions. His money holds the largest youth and children's tournaments. He sponsors wrestling teams for four boarding schools for orphans.

For several years, the Tennis Uzbekistan President Cup was sponsored by Abduvaliev.

=== Filmography ===
Below is a chronologically ordered list of films in which Salim Abduvaliev has appeared.

Year	Title	Role	Ref
2000	Xayot	Producer	
2004	Ko’zlar	Producer	
2005	Xayot	Producer	
2005	bir kam dunyo	Producer	
2006	Gunox	Producer	
2007	Gumrox	Producer	
2008	Sanam	Producer	

=== Series ===
Year	Title	Ref
2005	The 9th Company	Producer
2012	Qochqin	Producer
2014	Yurak	Producer

== Awards ==
- "Do’slik" State Prize of Uzbekistan 2015
- "Honored sports teacher of Uzbekistan 2021
- "XVI Ludwig Nobel Prize" 2022 which is named for the Russian-Swedish scientist Ludvig Immanuel Nobel and is awarded at the Konstantinovsky Palace in Saint Petersburg by the Ludvig Nobel Foundation (Russian: фонд Людвиг Нобел)
