= Ganavim Ba Hok =

- Directed by: Alexander Gentelev
- Produced by: Maya Zinshtein, Friederike Freier
- Starring: Vitali Dyomochka, Alimzhan Tokhtakhunov, Leonid Bilunov
- Cinematography: Israel Freedman
- Edited by: Alik Baskin, Martin Schröder
- Music by: Andreas Moisa, Philipp Edward Kümpel
- Release date: 22 April 2010 (Tribeca)
- Running time: 90 minutes
- Countries: Germany; Israel
- Languages: Russian, Hebrew, German

Thieves by Law, or Ganavim Ba Hok (Hebrew: גנבים בחוק), is a 2010 documentary film charting the rise of Russian organized crime in the wake of the fall of the Soviet Union. In the film several noted crime figures are interviewed, a number of which are currently wanted by Interpol.
