= El Cajon Police Department =

Municipal police agency in El Cajon, California

- Common name: El Cajon PD; Station K (radio ID)
- Abbreviation: ECPD
- Motto: Committed to a Safe and Secure Community Through Service, Mutual Cooperation and Respect

Agency overview
- Legal personality: Governmental: Government agency

Jurisdictional structure
- Operations jurisdiction: El Cajon, USA
- Map of El Cajon Police Department's jurisdiction
- General nature: Local civilian police

Operational structure
- Headquarters: 100 Civic Center Way; El Cajon CA, 92020
- Agency executive: Jeremiah Larson, Chief

Facilities
- Stations: 1
- Lockups: 1

Website
- http://www.elcajonpolice.org/ http://www.elcajonneighbors.org/

The El Cajon Police Department (ECPD) is the primary law enforcement agency of El Cajon, California. It was founded in 1912. The current police chief is Jeremiah Larson, who took over for the retiring Chief Michael Moulton in 2024. It is a member of the San Diego County–Imperial County Regional Communications System. The department's Forensic Science Laboratory is accredited by The American Society of Crime Laboratory Directors/Laboratory Accreditation Board (ASCLD/LAB).

== Divisions ==
- Animal Control
- Crisis Negotiation Team
- Communications
- Investigations
- Mounted Patrol
- Patrol
- Records
- Reserves & Cadets—for ages 16 to 21 who are interested in pursuing a career in law enforcement // unpaid sworn in reserve officers
- RSVP & Volunteers
- Special Enforcement
- SWAT
- Traffic

== Notable cases ==
- Granite Hills High School shooting
- Operation Shadowbox

== Notable members ==
- William John Cox (Billy Jack Cox), public interest attorney, author and political activist served as a police officer and detective between 1962 and 1968.
