= Kamchy Kolbayev =

Kyrgyz crime boss and narcotics trafficker (1974–2023)

Kamchy Asanbekovich Kolbayev
- Камчыбек Асанбек уулу Көлбаев
- Born: 3 August 1974
- Died: 4 October 2023 (aged 49); Bishkek, Kyrgyzstan
- Other names: Kamchibek Kolbaev, Kamchi Kolbayev, Kamchibek Kolbayev, Kamchi Bishkekskiy, Kolya Bishkekskiy, Kolya-Kyrgz
- Known for: Organized crime

Kamchy Asanbekovich Kolbayev (Russian: Камчибек Асанбекович Кольбаев; Kyrgyz: Камчыбек Асанбек уулу Көлбаев; 3 August 1974 – 4 October 2023) was an alleged crime boss in Kyrgyzstan. Crimes he was linked to include heroin trafficking . The US State Department in 2007 said he was "considered to be the leader of the most influential criminal heroin group in the country", and in 2012 US President Obama named Kolbayev "a significant foreign narcotics trafficker", operating as part of the so-called Brothers' Circle criminal society. He was subsequently added to the US Treasury's list of Specially Designated Nationals, preventing him from doing business in the US. The United States sought to dismantle ties to banking and finance that Kolbayev or his associates have constructed.

The new government, more hostile to organized crime, detained Kolbayev for a short period of time later releasing him without charge. This was not the first time Kyrgyz authorities have decided against branding Kolbayev a criminal; in 2007 a police investigation of his activities was ordered to cease by the then Minister of the Interior. Kolbayev may have spent time in a Kyrgyz prison earlier in his life, however.

After the death of Rysbek Akmatbayev in 2006, Kamchy was allegedly crowned a thief in law in a ceremony attended by Vyacheslav Ivankov.

In 2011, Kolbayev was detained in Abu Dhabi. Kyrgyzstan requested his extradition, but this was not granted; he was released in September 2011.

Kolbayev was mentioned in the batch of US leaked diplomatic cables in 2010.

Kolbayev was killed in Bishkek by Kyrgyz officers in a security operation on 4 October 2023. He was 49.

Salim Abduvaliev allegedly was the financier of Kolbayev.
