= Mamak Gang =

Malaysian criminal organization

The Mamak Gang is a notorious Malaysian gang that has been active since the early 1990s. Originally they specialised in breaking into factories and warehouses, but eventually they switched to mainly carjacking and robbing motorists. The gang is most notorious for stealing RM 12 million (equal to 2.8 million US Dollar) worth of gold bars from the Malaysia Airlines cargo complex at the former Subang Airport on Merdeka Day 1994 (31 August 1994). Although its key members were rounded up by the police several times and sentenced to either preventive detention or banished to remote areas of the country, they managed to run their "criminal empire" from detention by using mobile phones and couriers to deliver instructions for them. The gang's crime spree came to an end in December 2006 when Selangor police arrested the last three members of the gang still at large.
