= Veszprém stabbing =

2009 murder in Hungary

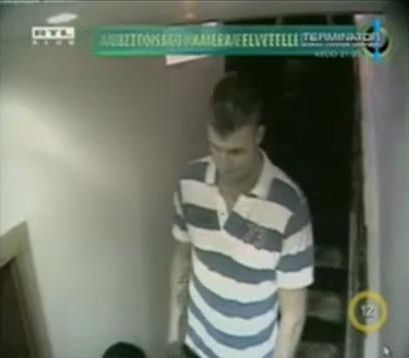
- Romanian handball player Marian Cozma shortly before his death.
- Location: Veszprém, Hungary
- Date: 9 February 2009
- Attack type: Mass stabbing
- Weapon: Knife
- Deaths: 1
- Injuries: 2
- Perpetrators: Sándor Raffael; Győző Németh; Iván Sztojka

On 8 February 2009, three members of the MKB Veszprém handball team were stabbed in a bar in Veszprém, Hungary. One of the handballers, Marian Cozma, was killed. The perpetrators, a trio of Roma men, were given two life imprisonment and a 20-year prison sentence, which were reduced to two 18-year sentences and a 13-year sentence in 2012.

== Background ==
Siófok was a favorite place of the clan and frequently caused problems for the owners since they often made quarrels and did not pay their bills.

Not a long time before the case, two of the three suspects (including Iván Sztojka) were released from prison after the duration of their prison sentence was mitigated by one third because of "good behavior". Residents claim to know the clan's gathering point, a gas station. Locals allege that shortly before the murder, the police stopped a truck loaded with supposedly stolen metal but the driver threatened the policeman while sticking a pistol in his mouth. However, police denies that the crime rate of Enying is above average. The Patrióta Lokál, the scene of the murder is a bar mostly serving as a club with a stable guest circle (including the handball team). In 2008, the bar won the town's "safe bar prize".

== Timeline ==
=== 7 February 2009 ===
In the afternoon on Saturday, 7 February 2009, a criminal from Veszprém, who had just left prison, knocked down one of the members of the clan, resulting in him suffering severe injuries. The clan member organized a group of family and friends from the villages of Enying and Dég (different sources cite 15, 20 or 30 people, including suspects Iván Sztojka, Sándor Raffael and Győző Németh) to take vengeance and started to search for the person in Veszprém at night to "settle" the problem. They thought the person would stay that night at the bar called Patrióta Lokál (English: Patriot local) also known as Skorpió bár (English: Scorpion bar).

=== 8 February 2009 ===
Cozma and other members of the KC Veszprém handball team (including Croat goalkeeper Ivan Pešić and Serb playmaker Žarko Šešum) arrived at the two-storey bar at around 12:30 a.m. to celebrate the birth of teammate Gergő Iváncsik's son and the birthday of teammate Nikola Eklemović. They stayed in the dance hall in the lower storey (basement). The upper storey serves as a cocktail bar. A group of 15 arrived at the bar between 1:30 and 2:00 a.m. They went down into the crowded dance hall and three of them - Raffael, Sztojka and Németh - started to talk to the guests. As they were not the regular customers or known to them, many guests started to leave the place. CCTV recordings showed that the three of them picked on the sportsmen and started to attack them without any reason. The music was shut down and people started to flee the place. Video recordings showed Cozma running up to the exit, being pursued by his attackers. In front of the bar, Cozma was stabbed in the back, and collapsed. Raffael then went up to him and stabbed him twice in the heart. When his teammates wanted to help Cozma, the other two attackers - Sztojka and Németh - stabbed Pešić in the kidney and kicked Šešum in the head. Police denied the rumors about the bartender girl being assaulted.

The police arrived at the scene and attempted to resuscitate Cozma while the other three injured players were taken to a hospital. Cozma died in the hospital two hours later. Pešić had to have his kidney removed and Šešum suffered severe craniocerebral trauma from the kick to the head.

The murder was caught on tape by nearby surveillance cameras, and records proved that the person who actually killed Cozma was Sándor Raffael. Three men were wanted in connection of the crime, Iván Sztojka, Győző Németh and Sándor Raffael.

== Aftermath ==
Footage showing Győző Németh, the second suspect in the murder case, handcuffed and being detained by the Austrian police became publicly available. The newspaper Magyar Hírlap published an editorial on the case. Ferenc Gyurcsány, the Hungarian prime minister criticized the newspaper, saying that the gravity of the criminal act is to be considered, not the ethnic origin of the suspects. After a nationwide manhunt which included setting up a special investigative unit and offering 2 million Hungarian Forints (approximately €7,000) for information on the suspect's whereabouts, Iván Sztojka gave himself up at the Veszprém Police station on the night of 12 February, at the pressures of the leader of his Romani community. He allegedly denied his participation in the crime, stating that he was only "at the wrong place at a wrong time". Petre Cozma, Marian Cozma's father, consistently said that not all Roma should be considered guilty for his son's death. He stated, "Let's not burn a forest for a sapless stub". János Ladányi, a Hungarian sociologist, was of the opinion that the anti-gypsy attitude reached such an irrational level that even a civil war was possible. During a memorial for Cozma, there were chants of "Death to Gypsies!" and in the following months, increased violence against Romani people in Hungary were recorded after the incident, however, there is no evidence of racist motive in either case.

In 2011, two of the men who killed Cozma, Sandor Raffael and Gyozo Nemeth, got life sentences, while a third defendant, Ivan Sztojka, was sentenced to 20 years in prison. Raffael claimed to regret his actions, stating to the court: “The greatest sin a man can commit is to take the life of another human being.” In April 2012, the sentences were shortened: Sandor Raffael and Gyozo Nemeth received 18-year prison sentences, while Ivan Sztojka was sentenced to 13 years in jail.
