= Contents of the United States diplomatic cables leak (Asia and Oceania) =

Content from the United States diplomatic cables leak has depicted Asia and Oceania subjects extensively. The leak, which began on 28 November 2010, occurred when the website of WikiLeaks — an international new media non-profit organisation that publishes submissions of otherwise unavailable documents from anonymous news sources and news leaks — started to publish classified documents of detailed correspondence — diplomatic cables — between the United States Department of State and its diplomatic missions around the world. Since the initial release date, WikiLeaks is releasing further documents every day.

== Afghanistan ==
=== Ahmad Zia Massoud ===
According to a cable from the American Embassy in Kabul, Vice President of Afghanistan, Ahmad Zia Massoud, was found carrying $52 million in cash that he "was ultimately allowed to keep without revealing the money's origin or destination." The discovery was made in the United Arab Emirates by local authorities working with the Drug Enforcement Administration.

=== Ahmed Wali Karzai ===
A cable recounting meetings between American officials and Ahmed Wali Karzai, in September 2009 and February 2010, offered the following warning: "Note: While we must deal with AWK as the head of the Provincial Council, he is widely understood to be corrupt and a narcotics trafficker". Noting several of Karzai's statements are known to be false, the cables explain that "He appears not to understand the level of our knowledge of his activities. We will need to monitor his activity closely, and deliver a recurring, transparent message to him".

=== Hamid Karzai ===
Hamid Karzai, President of Afghanistan, was described as "paranoid" in one cable.

=== German trust fund ===
The U.S. military took fifteen percent of the €50 million the German government gave to a trust fund to build up the Afghan National Army.

=== Bacha bazi ===
Employees of US government contractor DynCorp paid for the services of "dancing boys", apparently a euphemistic reference to Bacha bazi, which is considered sexual slavery and child prostitution.

== Armenia ==
Iraq War

The 2010 diplomatic cable leaks revealed U.S. anger against Armenia for shipping arms to Iran. In late 2008, U.S. diplomats came to the conclusion that in 2003 — when Serzh Sargsyan was the Defense Minister of Armenia — the Armenian government had purchased anti-tank rockets (RPG-22) and PK machine guns from Bulgaria and supplied them to Iran. These weapons were subsequently sent by Iran to insurgents in Iraq and were used in attacks there, killing one American soldier and wounding ten.

The diplomatic cables contain angry letters from Condoleezza Rice, U.S. Secretary of State, and John Negroponte, U.S. Deputy Secretary of State to Sargsyan, by-then-President of Armenia. The allegation was initially denied by Sargsyan but after U.S. diplomats presented the Armenian side with substantial evidence and pressed the country to introduce stricter export controls, Sargsyan "reversed the mantra he has repeated for the last four months" and agreed, despite Armenia National Security Service Chairman Gorik Hakobyan's attempts to lay the blame on Bulgarians.

U.S. troops continue to find military equipment from the Sargsyan deal at the hands of insurgents during their raids. For instance, U.S. military personnel discovered an arms cache in Baghdad on 15 February 2008 which belonged to the Hezbollah Brigades — an Iranian-backed Iraqi militant group. Among mostly Iran-manufactured weapons were six Bulgarian RPG-22 anti-tank weapons, production lot and serial numbers of which indicated they were produced by the Bulgarian firm which sold the weapons to Armenia.

Radiation Portal Monitor

On 26 August 2009, a car carrying three Armenian citizens entered Georgia from Armenia at the Sadakhlo border crossing. The car set off a gamma alarm on the radiation detection portal monitor. The driver provided a cursory explanation for the alarm, and the patrol police did not detain the group. On August 27, the same car returned to Armenia through the Sadakhlo crossing, and again set off a gamma alarm. At this point, the patrol police detained the occupants and searched the vehicle. Georgian officials determined that the car was contaminated with cesium-137. However, because the search did not produce any radioactive material, the occupants were released and returned to Armenia. It appears that whatever the car was carrying had been delivered.

== Azerbaijan ==
Political elite

Azerbaijan is described as a country "run in a similar manner to the feudalism found in Europe in the Middle Ages" where well-connected families are the political elite and control certain sectors of the economy as well as certain geographic areas. This political elite uses the government's mechanisms to "keep out foreign competitors." Among the well-connected families are First Lady Mehriban Aliyeva's family, the Pashayevs, whose members hold powerful positions in government and academia. The Pashayevs also operate extensively in Baku's construction and real-estate market, own several banks, an insurance company and Azerbaijan's only Bentley automobile dealership as well as having large investments in the financial and telecommunications sectors. In a subsequent cable, the Heydarovs are described as the second most powerful commercial family in Azerbaijan, controlling "a business empire in Azerbaijan ranging from fruit juice production to real estate development." Minister of Emergency Situations Kamaladdin Heydarov is described as the most powerful member of the family, having amassed his wealth during his tenure as the Chairman of the State Customs Committee.

Mehriban Aliyeva

The first lady of Azerbaijan, Mehriban Aliyeva is reported to have gone through "substantial cosmetic surgery, (done) presumably overseas." She is also dubbed more "fashion-conscious and daring" than the "average woman in majority-Muslim Azerbaijan", because she sometimes wears provocative dresses.

== Bangladesh ==
=== Rapid Action Battalion ===
The United Kingdom has assisted in training the Rapid Action Battalion (RAB) an elite anti-crime and anti-terrorism unit of Bangladesh Police which is described by the Human Rights Watch as a "government death squad". It was held responsible for more than 1000 extrajudicial killings. The British training was involved in "investigative interviewing techniques" and "rules of engagement" and conducted by serving British police officers, working under the auspices of the National Policing Improvement Agency (NPIA). However, the U.S. has been aware of this training sessions but its government was constrained by RAB's "alleged human rights violations, which have rendered the organisation ineligible to receive training or assistance [by U.S.]".

=== 2008 Bangladeshi general election ===
U.S. officials wanted leaders of both major political parties to participate in the 2008 Bangladeshi general election. A cable referring to a U.S. embassy study said the majority of Bangladeshis were in favor of immediate polls and any attempt to foil an election would not go down well with the masses.

=== Madrasahs ===
Department for International Development (DFID), UK has worked closely with Bangladeshi officials to change the curriculum of Madrasahs (a type of Islamic educational institution) as part of regional counter-terrorism strategies.

=== Peacekeeping in Africa ===
U.S. officials wanted to place Bangladesh peacekeepers under surveillance because of suspicions that Bangladesh was trying to gain influence in Africa through U.N. peacekeeping assignments. It indicates suspicion that Bangladesh's interest in peacekeeping in Africa has more to do with building influence in Africa than goodwill to the U.N.

=== U.S. concerns ===
U.S. officials seemed worried about rising numbers of Muslims, including Bangladeshis in the UK, and were collecting data about this.

=== DGFI support for Harkat-ul-Jihad-al-Islami ===
The Directorate General of Forces Intelligence (DGFI), Bangladeshi military's spy agency, supported Harkat-ul-Jihad-al-Islami — an Islamic fundamentalist terrorist/militant organization — forming a new political party. According to the cables sent by the U.S. Embassy in Dhaka, the DGFI made the attempt to float the Bangladeshi Islamic Democratic Party right before the 2008 Bangladeshi general election.

== Georgia ==
Russian covert military operations

U.S. dispatches had apparently reported as early as 2007 that Russia had provided Grad missiles and other arms to the Georgian separatist regions of South Ossetia and Abkhazia, and had engaged in a large variety of covert activities aimed at destabilizing Georgia, before the 2008 war.

Armenia-Georgia relations

It is implied in the cables that Georgia ignored Armenian offers for discussion on the situation and humanitarian measures during the 2008 war, causing many Armenian diplomats to feel offended. Eduard Nalbandyan, the Foreign Minister of Armenia, noted that if Armenian and Georgian ties weaken, there could be problems in the future with Javakheti Armenians.

2008–2010 Georgia–Russia crisis

The U.S. had consistently viewed only the Georgian account of events as legitimate regarding Georgia's conflict with Russia.

== Indonesia ==
In late March 2011, The Age published a leak stating that president Susilo Bambang Yudhoyono had used his power to spy on political rivals, protect corruption from court, and enrich his family. The leaks also stated that former vice president Jusuf Kalla bribed the Golkar Party in order to become its chairman.

== Kazakhstan ==
In 2009, ambassador Richard E. Hoagland quoted people skeptical about an anti-corruption campaign in Kazakhstan. He referred to a political analyst who "sees the recent convictions more as a sign of intra-elite warfare than evidence of a concerted anti-corruption effort" and a "civil society activist" who "describes the discredited officials as 'the weak links in the chain' and believes that the 'real sharks' are continuing to operate with impunity." Hoagland commented, "Corruption is endemic among Kazakhstani officialdom, as it is across the CIS. Blessed with strong tax revenues, government salaries are high in Kazakhstan compared to its neighbors -- for example, Prime Minister Masimov's salary is over $50,000 a year -- but most senior officials live lifestyles that require much higher incomes. In many instances, they receive profits from businesses registered in the names of their spouses or other relatives. In other cases, they're stealing directly from the public trough. The officials taken down by the anti-corruption campaign are thus just a tiny fraction of those with dirt on their hands."

== Koreas ==
North Korea was behaving like a "spoiled child", according to Chinese officials, who were prepared to accept Korean reunification under South Korean leadership. They estimated they could cope with an influx of 300,000 North Korean refugees in the event of instability on the peninsula.

U.S. and South Korea officials have discussed reunification of the two Koreas should the North ultimately collapse, according to the American ambassador to Seoul.

== Kyrgyzstan ==
=== Corruption ===
Corruption in Kyrgyzstan was discussed in a meeting in a Bishkek hotel between US ambassador Tatiana Gfoeller, British and Canadian business leaders, and The Duke of York from the United Kingdom. The Ambassador stated, "While claiming that all of them never participated in it and never gave out bribes, one representative of a middle-sized company stated that 'It is sometimes an awful temptation.' In an astonishing display of candor in a public hotel where the brunch was taking place, all of the businessmen then chorused that nothing gets done in Kyrgyzstan if President Bakiyev's son Maxim does not get 'his cut.'" On behalf of Maxim Bakiyev, London law group Carter-Ruck responded to The Guardian that "Mr Bakiyev absolutely denies the allegation."

=== Manas Air Base ===
In February 2009, the U.S. Ambassador to Kyrgyzstan spoke to her Chinese counterpart, Zhang Yannian, after being notified that China had offered Kyrgyzstan $3 billion in return for the closure of Manas Air Base — an important U.S. base in Bishkek handling flights into and out of Afghanistan. She stated that during the encounter "visibly flustered, Zhang temporarily lost the ability to speak Russian and began spluttering in Chinese". He responded with his own proposal to the U.S. on dealing with the Kyrgyz to keep the base open, during which his aide remarked: "Or maybe you should give them $5 billion and buy both us and the Russians out".

== Malaysia ==
=== Najib Tun Razak ===
According to revelations from Singapore diplomats about Malaysia's political scene, Najib Tun Razak, the Prime Minister of Malaysia is believed to be in a predicament over allegations of his involvement in the murder of Mongolian Altantuya Shaaribuu.

US officials have expressed their reservations regarding the appearance of Najib as a voice of moderation, citing incidents such as the cowhead's incident in Shah Alam, the use of the term "Allah" in the Malay bible and the Kartika caning incident.

=== Missing F5 jet engines ===
New Wikileaks information showed that the United States was upset that Malaysia did not inform them of missing F-5 engines from their Air Force inventory. There were worries in the US that the jet engines were sold to Iran in contravention of the arms embargo. This was during the tenure of Najib Tun Razak who was then the Defence Minister of Malaysia.

=== Human smuggling ===
US government officials are concerned that Malaysian immigration officials working in the Malaysian-Thai border are involved in the trafficking of Burmese nationals.

=== Racial rhetoric ===
Hishammuddin Hussein, the Malaysian Home Minister had suggested to US embassy officials in 2007 that Barisan Nasional component party Malaysian Chinese Association was at fault for being too weak to manage the reaction of non-Malays to the racially charged rhetoric of the 2006 UMNO general assembly.

=== Anwar sodomy trial ===
US diplomats warned UMNO leaders in 2008 that continued attacks against Pakatan Rakyat, especially regarding the sodomy charges against Anwar Ibrahim were a problem to Barisan Nasional survival saying it was anything but a political conspiracy.

=== Malaysian firms and Iran ===
US officials were told that Malaysian firms go to Iran with suitcases of money to purchase oil and gas concessions from the Iranians. The firms mentioned were national oil company Petronas and SK Ventures led by billionaire Malaysian Syed Mokhtar Al-Buhkary.

== Myanmar ==
Myanmar may be building missile and nuclear sites with the help of North Korea. A Burmese officer said he had witnessed North Korean technicians helping to construct an underground facility in foothills more than 300 miles (480 km) northwest of Yangon.

== Nepal ==
China is paying money to Nepal Police to arrest Tibetan refugees fleeing to India.

== Tajikistan ==
=== U.S. interests ===
According to diplomatic cables, U.S. interests in Tajikistan include: "a stable state on Afghanistan’s northern border, support for our military efforts in Afghanistan, and for Tajikistan to be a stabilizing influence and contributor to economic development in the region." Further, "Tajikistan gives unrestricted over flight rights, and quickly agreed to NDN (Northern Distribution Network) ground transit". Also, "They have indicated they would be happy for the U.S. establish an air base in Tajikistan. They see U.S. involvement in the region as a bulwark against Afghan instability, and as a cash cow they want a piece of."

=== Future development ===
"Tajikistan must overcome multiple political and economic problems which stymie its own development: poverty, bad relations with Uzbekistan, intense corruption, Soviet-era economic structures and planning, an undemocratic political system, chronic food insecurity, and dependence on migrant labor in Russia", according to diplomatic cables.

== Thailand ==
=== Viktor Bout ===
In Thailand, Russian associates of alleged arms dealer Viktor Bout tried to block his extradition from Thailand to the U.S. by bribing a key witness in the case, U.S. diplomats warned in secret cables. Abhisit Vejjajiva, Prime Minister of Thailand, was insisting his government was not subject to pressure from Washington to extradite Bout.

=== Vajiralongkorn ===
Officials at Singapore's Ministry of Foreign Affairs described Crown Prince Vajiralongkorn as "very erratic" and asserted that his gambling loans had been paid off by now-exiled former Thailand Prime Minister Thaksin Shinawatra.

== Turkmenistan ==
A December 2007 cable states: "Corruption and nepotism remain problems in Turkmenistan, and Turkish firms and Bouygues have done particularly well in the lucrative construction industry because they have mastered the business environment here."

According to a 2008 cable, the reported gift by Russian company Itera to President Gurbanguly Berdimuhamedow of a yacht worth €60 million 'serves as a sign that the company's willingness to go to great lengths to win business should not be underestimated'.

== Uzbekistan ==
Uzbekistan is described as a world of "rampant corruption", organised crime, forced labour in the cotton fields, and torture.

After Hillary Clinton presented a Women of Courage award in Washington, D.C., to a newly released Uzbek human-rights campaigner, Mutabar Tadjibayeva, Uzbekistani President Islam Karimov was displeased with the incident. This included an "implicit threat to suspend transit of cargo for U.S. forces in Afghanistan via the Northern Distribution Network" by Karimov. Richard Norland, U.S. Ambassador to Uzbekistan, claimed to have calmed Karimov down, but warned Washington, "Clearly, pressuring him (especially publicly) could cost us transit."

Gulnara Karimova, the president's first daughter, is said to own a wide variety of businesses in Uzbekistan, which were the result of unfair takeovers, and is believed to be "the single most hated person in the country". Lola Karimova-Tillyaeva, the president's youngest daughter, is described to be frequenting the nightclub Barkhan on a near-nightly basis, and the diplomatic cable quotes: "Barkhan ownership is obviously well connected, as it's the only place in town that flaunts selling non-Uzbekistan produced hard alcohol, which is against the law."

One diplomatic cable states, "[t]enders and government positions can be fairly easily secured by paying the right amount of money to the appropriate individual"
