= Yayo (drug trafficker) =

Dominican-American drug trafficker

Santiago Luis Polanco-Rodríguez (born June 16, 1961) is a Dominican American former drug dealer considered to be the first mass marketer of crack cocaine in United States. He is also known by his street name, "Yayo". Officials from the Drug Enforcement Administration have portrayed him as a calculating and disciplined criminal who organized Dominican, Jamaican and American street dealers into a marketing empire. Law enforcement officials say he was perhaps the richest Dominican drug kingpin in the United States.

== Early years and beginning criminal career ==
Born in Santiago, Dominican Republic in 1961, Polanco-Rodríguez was raised in Manhattan after his family immigrated legally in 1969. According to the DEA, in 1982 Polanco-Rodriguez began developing a small group that sold high quality cocaine outside his apartment near the corner of Audubon Avenue and West 174th Street. American and Dominican law enforcement officials have different theories about how he began selling crack. One is that Jamaican gang members he helped organize introduced him to the drug in June 1985, a few months after it first appeared in Los Angeles. Another theory is that the Medellín Cartel in Colombia recognized Polanco-Rodriguez's marketing talents and taught him how to cook the drug. Yet another theory is that while on vacation in the Dominican Republic he accidentally created the drug and had his drug addict brother smoke it and Yayo began to sell it when he saw its effects on his brother. He called his product Based Balls and merchandised the drug in heat-sealed glassine envelopes. His sellers offered discounts on the weekends and distributed business cards inscribed with Cop and Go. While doing this, he was building an empire in the Dominican Republic, hiring elderly women to hand-carry cash back to Santo Domingo. He laundered his profits through a wire-transfer storefront in Washington Heights as well as through a pharmacy, a nightclub and a finance company he set up in his homeland.

== Organizational structure ==
Polanco-Rodriguez recruited widely among gang members around northern Manhattan, the Bronx and Flatbush, Brooklyn. He adopted the organizational schemes of the Colombian cartels: some employees cooked and packaged the drug, others transported and stored it, and others sold it on the streets. Others were organized into a hit squad to overpower and take drug spots from smaller but stronger gangs throughout the Bronx and Brooklyn. The DEA claimed that Polanco-Rodriguez's hit squad was responsible for at least five slayings, although there was never enough evidence to indict. His enterprise also included several family members. His half-brother, Chiqui, ran the operation when Polanco-Rodriguez was in the Dominican Republic. A second brother, Elvis, delivered stashes to street locations, and a third, Santiaguito, was a cash courier. His sister, Dulce Elizabeth, and mother, Luisa Ordalina, counted the cash and maintained apartments where the crack was kept and produced. All are now fugitives in the Dominican Republic.

== DEA crackdown and flight to the Dominican Republic ==
In 1986, the DEA began an anti-crack campaign in New York, rounding up hundreds of buyers and street sellers, many of whom became informers. They led agents to Polanco-Rodriguez's headquarters at 2400 Webb Avenue and 2623 Sedgwick Avenue, in Kingsbridge Heights, Bronx. There, agents found bulletproof vests, automatic weapons, a gas mask and more than 100,000 empty crack vials. The operation was later believed to have been handed over to the much smaller but more ruthless Valera Brothers Organization along with the Bustamante brothers, Hector (July) and his brother Louis. In 1987, US Attorney Rudolph W. Giuliani signed a 58-count federal indictment charging Polanco-Rodriguez with drug trafficking, racketeering and money laundering. On July 3, 1987, federal authorities announced they had successfully terminated the drug ring, which they described as the biggest distributor of crack in New York City. Twenty-nine people were subsequently arrested for involvement in the drug ring.

=== Dominican Republic ===
Despite the government crackdown, Polanco-Rodriguez escaped arrest in New York by fleeing to the Dominican Republic with a fake passport. However, he was unable to stay out of trouble. He was shot in the leg during a gunfight over a woman in a Santiago nightclub. United States officials insisted that the Dominican government either extradite or imprison him. He was arrested in 1988 and sent to La Victoria prison without a trial. After fighting with other prisoners, Polanco-Rodriguez was transferred to the Monte Plata jail in 1990, where he bribed guards to allow him certain luxuries. But once again Polanco-Rodriguez became involved in an intense struggle with inmates when he stopped the attempted rape of a female prisoner. Fellow prisoners attempted to burn him alive by setting his cell cot on fire. Finally, in 1992, prison authorities released him. He is married to a woman named Johani Candelario, daughter of Renato Candelario, and is the father of five children. In an interview with The New York Times in 1996, Polanco-Rodriguez said he had retired from his life of crime, and DEA and Dominican drug officials said they had no evidence to the contrary.

== Escape ==
He escaped to the Dominican Republic, where he is a casino owner and lives a lavish life.
