= Brothers' Circle =

International criminal group involved in drug trafficking

The Brothers' Circle or Bratski Krug (Russian: Братский круг) is a term used to refer to Russian organized crime, commonly the Russian mafia. It is a loose translation of the Russian term "Bratva" (Russian: Братва), which can also be loosely translated as “brotherhood” or “band of brothers". The term "bratva" received its wide dissemination in the 1990s after the collapse of the Soviet Union, and was used as an informal address among the members of many gangs which spread throughout post-soviet republics. Today the term is used as an informal way of addressing close friends. This form of address and lack of proper interpretation resulted in its name being used in connection to Russian organized crime.

With support from Spanish prosecutor José "Pepe" Grinda González and Alexander Litvinenko, Spanish, German, Austrian, and Swiss authorities from June 2005 until 2007 conducted Operation Wasp (Russian: спецоперация «Оса») (Spanish: Operación Avispa) and, later, Operation Troika (Russian: Операция «Тройка») from 2008 to 2009 which led to the arrest by 2010 of more than 60 individuals including Zakhar Kalashov.

U.S. Department of the Treasury officials suggest that it operates in the Middle East, Africa, Latin America, and the United States, and is controlled by Vladislav Leontyev, a Russian man from Nizhny Novgorod. In 2011 the group was defined by the Obama administration of the United States in the "Strategy on Combating Transnational Organized Crime", as "A multiethnic criminal group composed of leaders and senior members of several criminal organizations largely based in countries of Europe. Many Brothers' Circle's members share a common ideology based on the thief in law tradition, which seeks to spread their brand of criminal influence around the world."

== Debate over existence ==
Mark Galeotti, an expert on Eurasian security, has stated that: "I have not found anyone in Russian law enforcement or elsewhere who actually says 'yes, the Brothers' Circle is an organization and it exists. As such the label Brothers' Circle could be seen as an attempt to connect disparate criminal gangs." In June 2012, with the designation of five more kingpins, Galeotti restated his opinion that the Brothers' Circle did not exist as a specific gang, but noted that the sanctions were in fact targeting members of Aslan Usoyan's criminal network.

== Alleged members ==
- Salim Abduvaliev
- Vitaly Idrilov (Russian: Виталий Идрилов)
- Zakhar Kalashov
- Vasiliy Khristoforov
- Kamchy Kolbayev
- Vladislav Leontyev
- Tariel Oniani
- Gafur Rakhimov
- Lazar Shaybazyan
- Vladimir Tyurin (born November 25, 1958; Tirlyansky, Bashkir Autonomous Soviet Socialist Republic)
- Alexey Zaytsev

== See also ==
- Georgian mafia
- Russian mafia
- Transnational crime
