= Podstava =

Scam originating in Russia

Podstava (Russian: Подстава, literally meaning "set-up") is a type of blackmail originating in Russia. It involves criminals setting up car accidents and then demanding huge sums of money for repairs from other drivers, whom they hold to blame. In the Russian Far East the crime is particularly popular, since many imported Japanese cars arrive at the coast en route to Moscow. The crime is dramatized in the Russian TV series Spets.

== See also ==
- Russian Mafia
