= Toomas Helin =

Estonian drug smuggler (born 1966)

Toomas Helin (born 25 April 1966 in Pärnu - died 27 January 2021) was an Estonian drug smuggler. Police considers Helin to have been among the leaders of the so-called Linnuvabriku group of organised crime.

== Drug smuggling ==
In 2002, when he was still under criminal investigation under suspicion of attempting to smuggle about a tonne of marijuana from Africa to Estonia, Helin gained notoriety by his bail, which was on 18 September 2002 set on 1.5 million Estonian kroons. As of 2007, it's still the largest bail set in Estonia.

In April 2005, Helin was convicted for several drug-related crimes, including the attempt to smuggle 973.46 kg of marijuana from Malawi to Estonia, and sentenced to six years and six months of imprisonment. Along with him were convicted Indrek Sürje and Märt Joller. Notably, all three were cleared of charges of membership in criminal organisation, sometimes (incorrectly) compared with the Common Law crime of criminal conspiracy.

In September 2007, he was released from prison. In April Helin was detained. On 30 April Estonian court decided to extradite him to Germany, suspected of organizing theft of luxury cars.

== Car thefts ==
German prosecutors suspect that Helin may have been one of the men involved in masterminding theft of 64 luxury cars in Baden-Württemberg and elsewhere in Germany in the total value of about EUR 4 mln.

Stolen vehicles were quickly driven to South of France and Spain where they were sold with a huge profit.

== Sources ==
- Eesti Ekspress 10 April 2002: Toomas Helin: "Politsei söödab mulle solki!" by Mihkel Kärmas
- http://bbn.ee/Default2.aspx?ArticleID=e41adc26-0127-44ac-b09f-2198b4409e7d
