= Roger Khan =

Guyanese drug lord

Shaheed 'Roger' Khan
- Born: 13 January 1972 (age 54); Guyana
- Other name: Roger
- Occupations: druglord, head of Phantom Squad
- Status: Released
- Criminal charges: drug trafficking and smuggling, arms trafficking, money laundering, assassinations, witness tampering, murder, illegal firearm possession
- Penalty: Sentenced to 15 years imprisonment

Shaheed "Roger" Khan (born 13 January 1972) is a Guyanese criminal who was active in drugs trafficking, money laundering and arms smuggling. He trafficked cocaine from Colombia into the United States and used construction and forestry businesses to launder money. Khan was considered to be Guyana's most powerful drug lord. In leaked US embassy cables Khan's control over Guyana is compared with Pablo Escobar's erstwhile control over Colombia.

Khan is allegedly the head of the notorious and lethal "Phantom Squad" which Caribbean Guyana Institute for Democracy has described as a murderous killing machine and which the US Federal Courts have said has already killed over 200 people during the 2002–2006 crimewave in Guyana.

There have been repeated claims that Khan had close ties with the Guyanese government. In 2006, after police issued an arrest warrant for him, Khan had publicly said in an advertisement that he was fighting criminals on behalf of the government.

Khan used to surround himself with a coterie of former police tactical squad members for security. According to leaked cables Khan used to pay his low-level security personnel US$1,600 per month—at least eight times what they previously earned with the police force.

In 1993 Khan was arrested in Burlington, Vermont, for receiving and possessing firearms while being a convicted felon (he was on probation for theft committed in 1992 in Montgomery County, Maryland, United States. He would be tried for possession of illegal firearms and ammunition but fled to Guyana when he was on bail. This is the reason why judge Dora Irizarry denied Khan bail in January 2007 when he was being sentenced for his crimes.

On 15 June 2006 Khan was arrested in Paramaribo with three of his bodyguards in a sting operation that Surinamese police said netted more than 200 kilograms of cocaine – the biggest cocaine haul in Suriname of that year. Instead of being deported to Guyana then minister of Justice of Suriname Chan Santokhi ordered that Khan would be flown to Trinidad. This decision received a lot of protest from president Dési Bouterse's party, which then formed the biggest opposition party in the parliament of Suriname. Upon the arrival at the airport of Trinidad Khan was handed over to immigration authorities who then handed him over to US officials. Less than 24 hours after being expelled from Suriname, Khan was arraigned at the Brooklyn Federal Court in New York City on 30 June 2006 on a charge of “conspiring to import cocaine” and was ordered to be detained at the Metropolitan Detention Centre in Brooklyn.

In October 2009, Khan was sentenced in a courtroom in Brooklyn, New York to 40 years imprisonment for trafficking large amounts of cocaine in the United States of America, witness tampering and illegal firearm possession.

According to US embassy cables Khan had ties with the FARC. Khan exchanged the arms he smuggled into Guyana from Suriname, French Guiana, and possibly France with the FARC for cocaine. According to the cables there are strong indications that Khan was deeply involved in a huge shipment of weapons to FARC in Colombia in December 2005.

In the cables there are also reports that Khan and Bouterse, who is the current president of Suriname, have met each other several times 2006 in Nickerie at the home of Bouterse's party member Rashied Doekhi to discuss cocaine trafficking and plot to murder then Suriname's minister of Justice Chan Santokhi and Suriname's attorney general Subhaas Punwasi.

According to the cables Khan also raised his nephew Zachariah Khan as his own son and started him at an early age committing murders, selling guns and drugs- making him a close associate to the Phantom death squad. In 2016 Zachariah was arrested in Miami, Florida along with his (Zachariah) wife for possession of illegal firearms and ammunition, along with a large quantity of cocaine found at the residence. It was later established that his (Zachariah) wife, Nafeeza Khan (Tricia) was released after questioning in Miami Florida and returned to Guyana. In June, 2016 Nafeeza was said to be administering both Khans' assets and terminated the "phantom death squad", or what was left of it. However, it was never verified that she was involved in any drug related instances said, New York Cables Edition.

Khan's lawyer in his case was Robert Simels. Simels is former lawyer of convicted drug trafficker Kenneth McGriff and American mobster Henry Hill, who received international fame because of the 1990 American crime movie Goodfellas which portrays his rise and fall. On 4 December 2009, Khan's lawyer was sentenced to 14 years in prison for, after consulting with Khan in jail, instructing a hit-man to kill the star witness in Khan's case. However, the hit-man turned out to be a government informant who secretly recorded the conversations with Simels. Simels and Khan were also convicted of possessing illegal eavesdropping equipment, which was seized in a raid on Simels' East Side offices.
