= Chaldean mafia =

Criminal organizations composed of ethnic Assyrians

- Founded: Early 1980s
- Founding location: Detroit, Michigan, United States
- Years active: 1980s–present
- Territory: Primarily the Detroit metropolitan area, as well as San Diego, California and Phoenix, Arizona
- Ethnicity: Chaldean American
- Activities: Racketeering, murder, arson, weapons trafficking, narcotics trafficking, money laundering, fraud, theft, counterfeiting, alien smuggling, assault, kidnapping, and armed robbery
- Allies: Detroit Partnership; Mexican Mafia; Sinaloa Cartel; Romanian mafia

The Chaldean mafia, or Chaldean organized crime, is a collective of criminal organizations composed of Chaldeans which emerged in the United States during the 1980s. Chaldean organized crime is active primarily in Detroit, as well as in San Diego, California, and Phoenix, Arizona.

== Overview ==
Chaldean mafia groups are composed almost exclusively of members of Chaldean descent originating from Iraq. Such groups are typically small, highly exclusive organizations, with members reporting to leaders known as "godfathers". The Chaldean mafia has a presence in cities in the United States with large Chaldean populations, such as Detroit, San Diego and Phoenix. Chaldean organized crime groups are involved in murder, arson, weapons trafficking, narcotics trafficking, money laundering, fraud, theft, counterfeiting, racketeering, alien smuggling, assault, kidnapping, and armed robbery, with links to the Detroit Partnership of the American Mafia, the Sinaloa Cartel and the Mexican Mafia. The role of Chaldean organized crime groups in the drug trade involves the transportation and distribution of large quantities of marijuana, cocaine and MDMA. In Detroit, Chaldean criminals are involved in distributing Canadian MDMA, Mexican marijuana, and powder cocaine and crack cocaine that is purchased from other criminal groups. Chaldean mafia-owned gas stations and convenience stores throughout the Detroit area are used to launder illicit proceeds from the drug trade.

== History ==
The Chaldean mafia originated in Detroit, Michigan in the early 1980s. The Metropolitan Detroit area is home to the largest population of Chaldeans outside Iraq. Louis Akrawi, known as the "Godfather of the Chaldean Mafia", fled Iraq in 1968 following an unsuccessful attempt to overthrow Saddam Hussein's Ba'ath Party and settled in Detroit, where he became a crime boss and an influential figure in the city's Chaldean community. Akrawi headed a crime syndicate which operated drug dealing, illegal gambling, and extortion rackets, using his restaurant, LA Ribs & Chicken, as a front. When he was given a key to the city by Mayor Coleman Young in 1980, Akrawi organized an anti-Hussein protest outside Sacred Heart Catholic Church.

In 1989, Chaldean drug kingpin Harry Kalasho, a nephew of Louis Akrawi, was killed in a drive-by shooting, causing a Chaldean gang war which resulted in numerous shootings and bombings.

In 1991, two associates of Louis Akrawi, Hatim Zakar and Najah Konja, were convicted in a conspiracy case in Oakland County, while Akrawi was acquitted.

Following an attempt on his life by a rival gang in 1993, Louis Akrawi hired two men to kill the owner of a Detroit party store. The assassination went awry, however, and an innocent bystander, Michael Cogborn, was shot dead. Akrawi was convicted of second-degree murder in 1996 and sentenced to 15-to-25 years in prison. Akrawi was paroled in November 2011, but spent three months in jail waiting for deportation proceedings against him. Since Iraq did not accept deportees from the United States that had no travel documents, the Michigan Department of Corrections revoked Akrawi's parole and returned him to prison. After he was paroled again in February 2017, Akrawi, along with his former associates, Hatim Zakar and Najah Konja, were among over a hundred Chaldean Iraqi illegal immigrants with criminal records who were arrested in the Detroit area by Immigration and Customs Enforcement (ICE) Enforcement and Removal Operations and targeted for deportation.

== Police investigations ==
The Chaldean mafia operated narcotics distribution networks from Phoenix and San Diego to Detroit. The work of the Detroit Metropolitan Violent Crime Task Force—with representatives from the FBI, the Bureau of Alcohol, Tobacco, Firearms and Explosives (ATF); the Drug Enforcement Administration (DEA), the Detroit Police Department, the Michigan State Police Department, and the Wayne County Sheriff's Office—resulted in the conviction of 111 subjects and the seizure of $5.3 million, 6.5 tons of marijuana, 25 kilograms of cocaine, five pounds of crystal methamphetamine, and 78 firearms.

In 2011 "Operation Shadowbox", a joint investigation between El Cajon, California police and the U.S. Drug Enforcement Administration into the trafficking of narcotics, firearms and explosives, allowed for the seizure of more than 13 pounds of methamphetamine; more than 5 pounds of ecstasy, pharmaceuticals, crack cocaine, heroin and cocaine; and more than 3,500 pounds of marijuana, most of which was likely smuggled through mastermind Furat Kalasho of Sterling Heights partnered with the Sinaloa Federation. Investigators also seized more than $630,000 in cash, three luxury cars, 34 firearms and four improvised explosive devices.

== Operation Shadowbox ==
"Operation Shadowbox" was a joint investigation between El Cajon Police and the U.S. Drug Enforcement Administration. On August 18, 2011 sixty Chaldeans were arrested at a Chaldean Social Club in El Cajon, near San Diego. This operation targeted mastermind Ben Kalasho of El Cajon, California. SWAT teams served search warrants on the club late Wednesday night, seizing more than $160,000 in cash as well as evidence of illegal gambling.

== See also ==
- Crime in Detroit, Michigan
