= Raymond Márquez =

American convicted of gambling and extortion

- Born: 1930 (age 95–96); Harlem, Manhattan, New York City, New York, U.S.
- Other name: "Spanish Raymond"
- Occupations: Gambling, numbers racket
- Spouse: Alice Márquez
- Children: Raymond David Márquez
- Conviction: 1. Federal gambling and extortion charges 2. New York state gambling charges
- Penalty: 1. Imprisoned for six years 2. Five years of probation and a $1 million fine

Raymond Márquez (born 1930), a.k.a. "Spanish Raymond", is an American criminal. He was the "king" of the illegal numbers racket in Harlem from the 1950s until his retirement in 2001.

== Early years ==
Márquez's parents moved from Puerto Rico to New York City in the late 1920s and settled in the Harlem section of Manhattan. He was born and raised in Harlem; there he also received his primary and secondary education. His father was able to establish a grocery store; however, the family's economic situation was not a good one and when Márquez graduated from Textile High School in 1947, at the age of 17, his parents were unable to send him to college.

== Harlem numbers racket and legal battles ==
In 1947, Márquez looked upon people who were prosperous, well dressed and involved in numbers activities as his role models. He began his career in the Harlem numbers racket as a pickup boy. As a pick up boy, he would go around Harlem, gathering the betting slips from the runners. The runners are those who solicited the wagers from the betting customers. Márquez would then turn in the slips to a regional controller and eventually the listed slips would end up at the headquarters of the gambling organization, known as a bank. Márquez branched out for himself within a year and gained a reputation for paying winning customers promptly.

Márquez had few legal scrapes during his early years. By 1958, law enforcement authorities publicly identified him as an underworld kingpin and that is when an investigator from the New York Police Department (NYPD), nicknamed him "Spanish Raymond", a moniker which has stood since then. Also in 1958, Márquez was accused in a killing related to his gambling activities. A grand jury failed to indict him for the murder. Márquez acknowledged bribing the police in the 1950s and 1960s to prevent raids on his illicit network. Márquez also was believed to have paid a percentage of his profits to Mafia boss Anthony "Fat Tony" Salerno. Márquez denied that he did business with the Mafia, and said that while he was friends with Salerno he was not a business partner.

== First conviction ==
In 1969, Márquez was arrested by the FBI on Federal gambling and extortion charges. He was convicted and sentenced to concurrent terms of three and five years imprisonment. He served a total of five years from 1970 to 1975. In 1975 he was released and continued in his former activities. This was during the post Knapp Commission era in which the NYPD was the focus of a scandal arising from pervasive corruption and the crackdown on the numbers racket was sidelined due to a moratorium on numbers gambling resulting from concerns that systemic corruption of the NYPD would continue to flourish. Protection payoffs to the police were no longer necessary.

Two years after his release from prison, in 1977, Márquez was briefly kidnapped, and was freed after payment of $8,100 in jewelry as ransom by his wife. He was found in the trunk of his car in Flushing, Queens. Márquez was identified in The New York Times as allegedly running a $25 million a year numbers racket.

Márquez received attention in the late 1970s, when a New York State Supreme Court justice, Andrew Tyler, was convicted of perjury for allegedly lying about a meeting with Márquez in 1975. The conviction was overturned in 1978.

== Controversial investments ==
In April 1994, he was arrested on state gambling charges. Prosecutors claimed that he had amassed a small fortune by illegal means and that therefore said fortune should be confiscated. The indictment led to a legal battle over attempts by city authorities to seize $6.5 million from him in unpaid taxes from wealth that they say was generated by illegal activities from 1990 to 1993. The prosecutors contended that Márquez and his organization handled about $30 million a year in wagers that were made at 41 parlors and that his organization faxed the reported earnings to his wife's yacht. His wife, Alice, also pleaded guilty to a gambling charge.

Márquez claimed that his wife had accumulated a fortune, including three motels, a 63-foot yacht and a home in Great Neck, New York, through legitimate investments. It was later shown that the home, the yacht and motels had all been acquired prior to 1990.

In 1995, Márquez was indicted on 221 counts of running a criminal enterprise. The charges were reduced to two counts, a "C" felony for attempted enterprise corruption and "E" felony for promoting gambling.

== Dramatic arrests ==
On January 13, 1995, 500 NYPD police officers raided 69 locations, including nearly a dozen money banks, which were allegedly under the Márquez family's control. Police arrested 75 employees on felony gambling charges, confiscated over $100,000 in cash, and seized over a dozen keys to safety deposit boxes.

According to a law enforcement official, the operation was managed by his two nephews, Peter and Robert Márquez Jr., grossed between $25 and $30 million per year, and was headquartered in a row of four contiguous buildings on St. Nicholas Avenue and 113th Street which were connected by a series of doors, tunnels and trapdoors. Robert and Peter Márquez were arrested, along with their sister, Christine, and father Fernando.

== An ill-advised plea bargain ==
In April 1996, Márquez pleaded guilty after making an agreement with the District Attorney's office to forfeit $1 million and to serve a 90-day jail sentence with four years and nine months of probation.

However, it was discovered by the Appeals Bureau at the D.A.'s office that a split sentence with a "C" felony was reserved only for those with a narcotics conviction, thus making the deal invalid. Márquez's lawyer sought to withdraw the guilty plea, which was denied by the court. Márquez was sentenced to five years' probation and a $1 million fine.

In 1998, Márquez and three associates were indicted on 52 counts and charged with running a criminal organization, in the culmination of a year-long NYPD investigation. The prosecution built a case on circumstantial evidence consisting of recordings of Márquez's cell-phone conversations and numerous surveillance videos and photographs of him driving by reputed gambling parlors. Márquez, who was represented by his son, claimed that he was doing research on his autobiography and that was the reason that he showed up on the surveillance tapes. He and three co-defendants were all acquitted after a three-month trial.

== Lawsuit against New York City ==
In 2001, Márquez sued the City of New York for $15 million, claiming that he contracted bladder cancer caused by the secondhand cigarette smoke he inhaled at Rikers Island and the Tombs while confined there for 29 months in the 1990s. Márquez admitted he smoked for three decades before quitting in the 1970s. His son and lawyer, David Márquez, maintained that he had not inhaled deeply when he smoked, that the ventilation system at Rikers Island was inadequate, and that by the time he went to Rikers he hadn't smoked in 23 years. In 2008, a jury rejected the claim after a trial in New York State Supreme Court.

== Retirement ==
Márquez announced his retirement in 2001, saying that he was fed up of being targeted by the office of Manhattan's District Attorney Robert M. Morgenthau. In an interview with the New York Daily News, Márquez described the numbers game as "a source of entertainment to the people" and professed his innocence to the various criminal charges that had been leveled against him over the years. Prosecutors responded that Márquez's "saint act doesn't ring true" and that numbers rackets enforce their control through violence.

Márquez runs and manages hotels in Commack, Long Island, and Fort Lauderdale, Florida. In 2011, Márquez was targeted by New York City authorities for owing $1.6 million in unincorporated business taxes, making him one of the city's top scofflaws. His son said Márquez would never pay it, saying that Márquez was judgement-proof.

== See also ==
- List of Puerto Ricans
