= Francisca Cortés Picazo =

Spanish drug lord

Francisca Cortés
- Born: Francisca Cortés Picazo; May 19, 1955 (age 71)
- Other name: "La Paca"
- Spouse: Francisco Pulet Rodríguez "El Tarta"
- Children: Francisco Fernández Cortés "El Chirri"
- Status: in prison
- Allegiance: La Paca clan
- Conviction: Unlawful detainment
- Criminal charges: Money laundering
- Penalty: 22 years

La Paca clan
- Years active: ? -2008
- Territory: Son Banya, Majorca
- Ethnicity: Romani
- Membership: 20 members
- Activities: heroin and cocaine dealing

Francisca Cortés Picazo (born 20 May 1955), more commonly known as "La Paca", is a Spanish drug lord, and matriarch of the Romani drug clan known as "La Paca" clan.

The clan operated out of the predominantly Romani neighbourhood of Son Banya on the island of Majorca dealing heroin and cocaine.

== Arrest ==
La Paca was arrested on July 2, 2008 in Son Banya, along with 19 others, by the Civil Guard in an operation dubbed Operation Kabul.

== Further viewing ==
- "El poder de la Paca". Equipo de investigación. Season 4. Episode 9 (in Spanish). 2013-03-08. laSexta.
