= Rolando Florián Féliz =

Dominican drug lord

Rolando Florián Feliz (died 16 May 2009) was considered the most dangerous drug trafficker ever convicted in the Dominican Republic, held in Najayo Penitentiary’s maximum security facility since May 1996. Florián Féliz was also convicted for the murder of Víctor Augusto Féliz, son of the reformist leader and ex- senator of Barahona, Augusto Féliz Matos.

During December 2005, a San Cristóbal Province judge ordered Florián Féliz’s incarceration in the cell block with common prisoners at Najayo Penitentiary, in the wake of the discovery of a second tunnel through which the inmate presumably planned to escape. The finding was made during the works to remodel the prison at Monte Plata. The discovery resulted from Florián’s own request for transference, alleging that he was being treated in violation of penitentiary rules, including his being held in a maximum security cell, being kept from attending Sunday Mass and denied visitors.

In the April 2006 extradition request for the money changer Euleterio Guante, the U.S. Government included Juan Danilo Florián Féliz, brother of Rolando Florián Féliz. The U.S. also requested Francisco Féliz and another man known only as Edwin (El Flaco), charged with utilizing Dominican territory to introduce drugs to Puerto Rico by ship. According to a case prepared by the National District Prosecutor, in April 2003 Guante participated in transporting 1,451 kilos of cocaine to Puerto Rico, along with Pedro Alberto Ubiera Jiménez, Angel Cuevas Guillén, Quirino Paulino, Francisco Fortune Maconi Diaz, one known only as Kiko and others declared fugitives.

== Accommodations in prison and death ==
On 16 May 2009 Rolando Florián Féliz was killed by a prison official during an altercation taking place on the outer premises of the Najayo prison. A preliminary enquiry was carried out by officials for the Procuradoría General (State Department), National Police and Prisons Authority. In addition to the events leading to Florián's death the report candidly describes the inmate's luxurious lifestyle as well as a complicit (at times reluctant) permissiveness and deference granted towards him by the prison staff.

As photographic evidence in the report shows Florián lived in considerable opulence in a cell or set of cells that apparently had been joined into a single apartment. He enjoyed the use of electric appliances, including air conditioning and a refrigerator. He had fully furnished rooms, including a personal collection of books, paintings, portraits, flat television screen and many other belongings.

Around 1:00 pm of the day in question, Florián received an unscheduled visit by two young women. One of the women was 17 years of age and not identified in the report, as she is a minor by Dominican laws. Despite the irregular time of the visit the two young women were allowed to enter the prison by Lieutenant Colonel José Antonio Pulinario Rodríguez. According to the report Florián was already hosting a gathering with several other prison inmates which included food and alcoholic drinks. Florián left his fellow inmates in general areas of his cell while he retired to his bedroom with the women to engage in sexual activities.

These irregular acts caused uneasiness among the very officials who approved of the events in the first place, and a series of communications up and down the chain of command occurred. Various prison officials visited Florián's cell and requested for the two women to leave. Florián Féliz refused on several occasions to allow the women to comply with the request. These refusals were relayed to superiors. Police Lieutenant Colonel José A. Pulinario Rodríguez visited the cell on two occasions and left on both times having no success in persuading Florián. The second visit by José A. Pulinario took place between 8:00 pm and 9:00 pm. Shortly after Pulinario's departure Florián Féliz instructed the women to stay and instead exited his cell armed with a knife in search of Pulinario.

According to the report Florián Féliz found a group of officers near the front outdoor areas of the correctional facility. He attempted to injure Lieutenant Colonel Pulinario Rodríguez, who avoided injury and fled the scene. Florián Féliz then turned his attention to two other officers. He injured Captain Lino De Oca Jiménez, cutting his mouth and one of his fingers. Although Captain Jiménez is reported as initially not being equipped with a firearm per the prison's regulations, during the ensuing struggle the Captain produced a 9 mm Browning (registered to Pulinario Rodríguez) and fired several times at Florián. The post-mortem report revealed Florián had been shot eight times, one of them a fatal wound.

Despite his extensive injuries Florián managed to return to his cell, telephone his wife and move to a fellow inmate's cell to receive aid. He was later transported to a hospital and died approximately 13–15 hours after the shooting. The toxicology report revealed Florián Féliz had ingested alcohol in the hours prior to the shooting. There was no evidence of consumption of illegal drugs.

== Legacy after death ==
At the time of his death Florián Félix was concluding a 51-chapter biography detailing his life story, his rise and fall. Many speculate that the tell-all nature and contents of the book upset many within the narco-trafficking business and eventually led to his death. The chapters were titled

1. El Umbral de la prisión
2. La Familia
3. El Aislamiento " La Solitaria "
4. Los Traumas De la prisión
5. Mis primeros días En la prisión
6. La Justicia Dominicana
7. La Prensa " el 4to Poder "
8. Los abusos
9. LA igualad
10. Mis Sueños
11. La compasión Perpetua
12. La conspiración
13. Las manipulaciones
14. Las repressiones y restricciones
15. Acusaciones, expedientes
16. Mito o realidad
17. la victima
18. Un apellido maldito
19. Los temores
20. Los amores
21. mis hijos
22. Mis Amigos
23. Objetividad manipulada
24. Sentimientos
25. ¿ Vida o existencia?. "sobre vivencia en prisión "
26. " La ultima Trama
27. arrepentimiento
28. Condiciones para mi libertad
29. Mi fortaleza y mi resistencia
30. mis experiencias con dios " Mi fe"
31. Mis bienes (dinero, propiedades)
32. Mi mayor necesidad
33. ¿La resolución?
34. Una prisión dominicana
35. El desacato, ¿justicia o que?
36. Deseos anhelados
37. La juventud de la cárcel
38. Acercamiento con dios; "mi fe"
39. la depresión en la prisión
40. Los vicios en la cárcel
41. No caigas en las garras de las drogas
42. Mis aspiraciones ya en libertad,
43. Mis recuerdos
44. Sistema penitenciario dominicano
45. El sistema y el trato al recluso
46. Mis confesiones
47. Los que nunca me dieron la espalda.
48. Los que creyeron en mi
49. los que se aprovecharon y beneficiaron de mi prisión,
50. Los jinetes de las drogas en republica dominicana y
51. los que hacen llover las drogas en republica dominicana

By the time of his death, Florián Féliz had earned approximately 47 certifications and diplomas ranging from plumbing, law, chemistry, physics and mathematics. Many of these degrees were earned during his tenure in prison and can be seen adorning the walls of his Najayo prison cell, in photos. While imprisoned Florián held audience with several prominent professors and scholars, who tutored him to assist him in earning these degrees. Rolando Florián Féliz left behind 15 children.
