= Hewa Rahimpur =

Kurdish human trafficker

- Born: Hewa Sherzad Rahimpur; April 1993 (age 33); Sanandaj, Iran
- Citizenship: Iranian
- Status: In prison
- Penalty: 11 years imprisonment and €80,000

Hewa Sherzad Rahimpur (born April 1993) is a Kurdish human trafficker. He was thought to have charged up to £6,000 for people on the boats, with total profits sometimes exceeding £200,000 per passage.

== Life ==
Hewa Sherzad Rahimpur was born in Sanandaj, Iran in April 1993. His family of Kurdish origin was poor and had many children.
