= Kansuke =

- Gender: Male

Origin
- Word/name: Japanese
- Meaning: Different meanings depending on the kanji used

Kansuke (written: 悍右 or 勘助) is a Japanese given name.

Notable people with the name include:

- Kansuke Naka (中 勘助) (1885–1965), Japanese writer
- Yamamoto Kansuke (general) (山本 勘助) (1501–1561), Japanese samurai
- Kansuke Yamamoto (artist) (山本 悍右) (1914–1987), Japanese photographer and poet
