= Kozakura-class traffic boat =

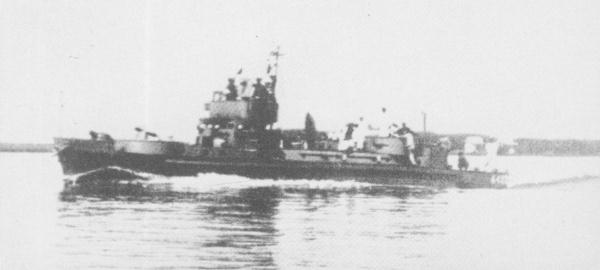
- IJN Kozakura in 1935

Class overview
- Name: 30-ton traffic boat
- Builders: Harima Zōsen Corporation, Harbin shipyard
- Operators: Imperial Japanese Navy; Manchukuo Imperial Navy
- Built: 1935
- In commission: 1935–1939 (Japan); 1939–1945 (Manchukuo)
- Planned: 2
- Completed: 2
- Retired: 2 (?)

General characteristics
- Type: Traffic boat (Motor gunboat)
- Displacement: 30 long tons (30 t)
- Length: 25.00 m (82 ft 0 in) overall
- Beam: 3.65 m (12 ft 0 in)
- Height: 1.60 m (5 ft 3 in)
- Draft: 0.60 m (2 ft 0 in)
- Propulsion: 2 × Ikegai diesels, 2 shafts, 120 bhp
- Speed: 13.2 knots (15.2 mph; 24.4 km/h)
- Armament: 3 × Type 92 7.7 mm machine guns; 1 × minesweeping gear

The Kozakura-class traffic boat (小櫻型交通艇,, Kozakura-gata kōtsūtei) was a class of motor gunboat of the Imperial Japanese Navy, serving from the 1930s to World War II. The IJN official designation was 30-ton traffic boat (三拾瓲交通艇,, 30-ton kōtsūtei).

== Background ==
In 1934, Manchukuo ordered four gunboats from Japan. The IJN established Extraordinary Navy Defense Corps (臨時海軍防備隊, Rinji Kaigun Bōbitai) to educate them and built two 30-ton motor gunboat Kozakura and Hakubai. In 1939, Kozakura and Hakubai which finished a duties and transferred to Manchukuo Imperial Navy, and the IJN withdrew from Manchukuo.

== Ships in class ==
Ship	Laid down	Launched	Completed	Fate
Kozakura (小櫻)	30 April 1935	25 July 1935	25 August 1935	Harima's yard number # 217. Transferred to Manchukuo and renamed Hai Tien (海天) on 25 February 1939; survived war; whereabouts after that has been unknown.
Hakubai (白梅)	30 April 1935	25 July 1935	25 August 1935	Harima's yard number # 218. Transferred to Manchukuo and renamed Hai Yang (海陽) on 25 February 1939; out of service in wartime.

== Bibliography ==
- The Maru Special, Japanese Naval Vessels No.53, Japanese support vessels, "Ushio Shobō". (Japan), July 1981
- 50 year History of Harima Zōsen, Harima Zōsen Corporation, November 1960
- "Japan Center for Asian Historical Records (JACAR)"., National Archives of Japan
  - Reference code: C05034350900, No. 3814, 1935 September 13, Exhausting Arms supply of constant outside Extraordinary Navy Defense Corps
  - Reference code: C05034620500, No.3118 July 19, 1935 Sending of 30-ton Traffic Boat's Weapons for Naval Department Stationed in Manchuria by Special Service Vessel Service on Consignment
  - Reference code: C05034912100, No.1621 April 7, 1936 Cooking Rooms Reform of Launches Kozakura and Hakubai
  - Reference code: C05035340800, Naval Department in Manchuria Confidential No.6 October 30, 1936 Progression Outline, Achievement and Remarks for Communication Drill Implemented in Fiscal Year 1936 August
