= Alimzhan Tokhtakhunov =

Russian businessman

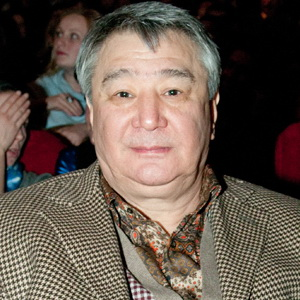
- Alimzhan Tokhtakhunov (2011)
- Born: Alimzhan Tursunovich Tokhtakhounov; 1 January 1949 (age 77); Tashkent, Uzbek SSR, Soviet Union

Alimzhan Tursunovich Tokhtakhounov (Russian: Алимжан Турсунович Тохтахунов; born 1 January 1949) is a Russian businessman, suspected criminal, and former sportsman. He is accused in relations with organized crime and bribing of figure skating judges in the 2002 Winter Olympics. His nickname is thought to be "Taiwanchik" (Russian: Тайванчик, lit. 'Little Taiwanese'), which refers to his distinctly Asiatic, as opposed to European, facial features. He has been wanted by the FBI since 2013 for a sophisticated money laundering scheme. As of 2022 he hides in Russia. The United States Department of State listed him as wanted and offered reward for up to $4 million for information leading to his arrest or conviction.

== Biography ==
Tokhtakhounov was born to a Uyghur family in Tashkent, Uzbek SSR, in 1949. In his early years, he was an amateur football player, playing for junior team of Pakhtakor in some seasons. His attempts to continue his career in CSKA Moscow failed and he soon ceased to play. Tokhtakhounov was twice imprisoned: in 1972 and in 1985 for "parasitism".

In 1989, he moved to Germany. He became a citizen of Israel and was allegedly involved with international arms sales with the Western Group of Forces and an Arab country.

In the early 1990s, he settled in Paris, France. There he was soon accused in committing illegal business deals and smuggling of hardware from Germany. He was also reported to have relations with the Russian mafia, including ethnic Georgian mobster Tariel Oniani. After his residence permit in France expired, French authorities refused to renew his residence permit and subsequently he moved to Italy.

In 2002, Tokhtakhounov was accused in bribery of ice skating judges in the 2002 Winter Olympics. He was arrested in Italy by US request, but the Italian court denounced the extradition bid and freed Tokhtakhounov. After he was released from detention in Italy, he moved to Russia.

In Russia, he was investigated about the legality of his Russian citizenship.

He is notably close to professional Russian tennis players. For instance, a 2002 article in the Belgium daily La Libre Belgique reported on interviews of Russian players following Tokhtakhounov's arrest in Italy: Yevgeny Kafelnikov defended his "friend", Marat Safin refused to discuss a topic that was "not his problem", while Anna Kournikova commented "I have heard of this man. But I don't think I should talk about it. I am Russian and I will have to go back there".

The United States has a current arrest warrant out for him on fraud-related charges. In 2010, Alimzhan featured in the 2010 documentary Thieves by Law. He lives openly in Russia.

In November 2010, Russian tax authorities stated that Taiwanchik had not paid 115,000 rubles in taxes on his estate in the elite village of Lapino beyond the Moscow Ring Road 30 kilometres (19 mi) west of Moscow near the Rublevo-Uspenskoye Highway Route A106.

=== FBI investigation ===
In 2013, Tokhtakhunov was charged with running an illegal gambling ring based in the United States.

According to ABC News, he was caught up in an FBI investigation of "a sophisticated Russian organized crime money-laundering network that operated out of unit 63A in Trump Tower in New York." According to federal prosecutors, "his is the top of the top of the top in organized crime in Russia."

The FBI investigation led to a federal grand jury indictment of more than 30 people, including Vadim Trincher, Anatoly "Tony" Golubchik also spelled Golubczyk, Molly Bloom, Helly Nahmad, and Tokhtakhounov, who escaped arrest and remains a fugitive from American justice. For his support of the illicit operation, Tokhtakhunov allegedly received more than $12 million by the Taiwanchik-Trincher Organization from December 2011 to February 2013. (Note: The 2017 film Molly's Game was based upon Molly Bloom's activities during this FBI investigation.)

The U.S. State Department was offering a $4 million reward for Tokhtakhunov's arrest as of 2022.

== Personal ==
Alimzhan Tokhtakhunov hides in Russia. He lives in Lapino at Rublyovka village which is located near the Rublevo-Uspenskoye highway (Russian: Рублево-Успенское шоссе) Route A106 beyond the Moscow Ring Road 30 kilometres (19 mi) west of Moscow.

=== Family ===
In 2013, he was sued by 24-year-old Yulia Malik with whom he previously had a relationship and fathered 2 daughters. Mrs. Yulia Malik asked the court to return her daughters back from Tokhtakhunov to her. The court have allegedly sided with her.

Tokhtakhunov has four children, one son, and three daughters. As of 2019 she was living in the US. His son Dmitry was born out of wedlock. Dmitry had two children born in 2019.

== See also ==
- The World's 10 Most Wanted
- Timeline of Russian interference in the 2016 United States elections
