= Chapare Cartel =

Bolivian criminal organization

The Chapare drug cartel is a Bolivian criminal organization dedicated to drug trafficking and human trafficking that operates in the Chapare region. For this, several journalists have baptized this organization simply as the Chapare Cartel

During the entire presidency of Evo Morales in Bolivia and the expulsion of the DEA from this country in 2008, drug trafficking has skyrocketed in the country. Since 2014, Bolivia is one of the principal producers of cocaine in the world. According to the UN 94% of the coca production of the country goes to illegal markets.

The cartel currently has strong connections with the political party of the Movement for Socialism. For all these reasons, the Interamerican Institute for Democracy described the government of Evo Morales as that of a Narco-state . This vision is shared by researcher Diego Ayo from the Vicente Pazos Kanki foundation. Currently the structure of the cartel is unknown. However, according to the Peruvian journalist Jaime Bayly, the head of the cartel would be the former president of Bolivia, Evo Morales while the coca growers unions are the main drug suppliers for the international market.

== Chronology of the cartel and conformation of the Narco-state ==
The Chapare Cartel has its origins in the merger of six Federaciones Cocaleras del Trópico, in the región of Chapare. This federations are dedicated to the production and commercialization of coca leaves, the oldest being the Federación Especial de Colonizadores de Chimoré, founded in 1964.

In 1996, a then unknown Evo Morales became president of the coordinating committee of the six federations of the tropics.

A boost that this organization would gain would be with the assumption of Evo Morales to the presidency of the country with his first term, which began in 2006.

In 2008, Evo Morales decided to expel the DEA from the country.

The Chapare region had long been declared by the Special Force for the Fight against Narcotrafficking (FELCN) as a "red zone for drug trafficking".

In 2010, Evo Morales admitted to the British BBC news network that drug trafficking had permeated all levels of the state, although he accused the United States of this, without proofs.

On July 29, Valentín Mejillones, Evo Morales' personal priest, was arrested for possession of 350 kg of drugs.

In 2011, the General of the Bolivian Police, René Sanabria Oropeza and former anti-drug chief assigned by Evo Morales, was accused and sentenced in the United States for drug trafficking. That same year, Morales declared his fear that Sanabria would reveal MAS names in exchange for negotiating his sentence.

In 2012, the Brazilian magazine Veja accused Evo Morales and his then minister Juan Ramón Quintana, of providing raw material for the production of drugs that were destined for Brazil

In 2012, former senator Roger Pinto asked Brazil for political asylum for fear of an attack on his personal security and for having "evidence of corruption and links with drug trafficking at the highest levels of the government of President Evo Morales".

In September 2013, a ghost town exclusively built for drug production was discovered in Oruro and the media points responsibility to the government.

That same year, in November, Luis Cutipa Salva, then a substitute deputy of the MAS was arrested for diverting 45,000 tons of coca leaf to drug trafficking hot spots.

In September 2015, former Bolivian businessman José Luis Sejas Rosales is arrested for an international arrest warrant for drug trafficking in Argentina. Sejas Rosales was a former advisor to Yacimientos Petrolifos Fiscales Bolivianos.

In July 2017, Romer Gutierrez Quezada, a former MAS adviser, was arrested in Brazil when he tried to enter 100 kg of drugs.

In October 2017, in a joint operation between the Brazilian Federal Police and the Matto Grosso Military Police, a plane containing 480 kg of cocaine was captured, and arrested, in this country, Carmen Iris Lima Lobo, former candidate for the sub-government of the department of Beni. Previously, in September, his nephew, Abio Adhemar Andrade Lima Lobo, was arrested in this same country for trying to enter Brazil 480 kg. of cocaine.

On April 18, 2018, the former consul of Bolivia in Brazil, Haisen Ribero, is arrested for possessing 528 kg. of high purity cocaine. Days later, at the request of the government, he is released.

On April 23, 2019, Gonzalo Medina, former director of the FELCN and the captain of the Bolivian Police, Fernando Moreira, are arrested on alleged drug trafficking charges.

On June 4 of that same year, another MAS official, Mayerling Castedo, was arrested, along with members of her family (her children: Darío and Joice Candia Castedo as well as her son-in-law Hugo Yañez and her nephew, Luís Darío Candia Zelada) by members of the police for alleged drug trafficking.

On September 13, 2019, Winston Julio Rodriguez was arrested for possession of 166 kg of cocaine. Newspapers of the country begin to circulate photos of Evo Morales next to Winston Julio Rodriguez.

On December 18, former consul Diego Fernando Vega Ibarra was arrested in Argentina for drug trafficking in that country.

On February 6, 2020, Dora Vallejos, wife of drug trafficker Bismark Carlos Padilla and personal friend of former MAS minister Carlos Romero and General Gonzalo Medina, was formally arrested for drug trafficking.

On March 5, 2020, Terán and Elba Terán, sisters of Margarita Terán (a member of the MAS party), are sentenced to 15 years in prison for the crime of drug trafficking.

On April 10 of that year, Faustino Yucra, a former coca grower leader and friend of Evo Morales, was arrested, accused of drug trafficking, terrorism and sedition.
