= Ismail Lika =

Albanian mobster

Ismail Lika was a Kosovar-Albanian mobster active in New York City in the 1980s.

Dubbed the king of the New York drug underworld, Ismail Lika issued a contract on Giuliani's prosecutors in 1985. Ismail Lika was the leader of an ethnic Albanian criminal outfit involved in trafficking heroin from Afghanistan and Turkey, via Kosovo into the US. Caught with at least $125 million in heroin, members of this Kosovan smuggling outfit issued a $400,000 contract on the prosecutor Alan Cohen and the detective Jack Delemore, both placed under protective custody as a result.
