= Halil Ay =

Turkish drug trafficker (1989–2023)

- Born: 4 February 1989; Gerger, Adıyaman, Turkey
- Died: 6 August 2023 (aged 34); Isère, France
- Cause of death: Assassination
- Citizenship: Turkey
- Occupation: Drug trafficker

Halil Ay (4 February 1989 – 6 August 2023) was a Turkish drug trafficker and gangster. He came to public attention after surviving an assassination attempt on the Golden Horn Bridge in January 2023 and then being assassinated again in France.

== Life ==
Halil Ay was born on 4 February 1989 in Gerger. His family, of Zaza origin, later moved to Yüreğir, Adana. After graduating from high school, he entered the world of crime and after a while he came into conflict with many gangs in Adana. Thinking that he had made enemies, he migrated to Istanbul.

On 14 January 2023, he survived an assassination attempt on the Golden Horn Bridge and his friend Cumali Aslan, who was with him at the time, died. This attempt was organised using FaceTime, citing Ay's hostility towards the Dalton gang and the Gündoğmuş gang. The attack took place at midnight when Ay and three friends were returning home in a white BMW car from a nightclub in Şişli, Istanbul. The police found 41 bullet casings at the scene. The three perpetrators of the attack fled on foot due to the breakdown of their car and called someone to pick them up. The attackers were caught by the police two days later.

=== Assassination ===
Ay, after surviving the assassination attempt, first left Istanbul and travelled to Greece, and from there he went to France with a fake identity. In the early days of August 2023, Gülbey Dilsiz, a hitman of the Gündoğmuş gang, followed Ay and travelled illegally to France.

On 6 August 2023, Ay was attacked by Gülbey Dilsiz at a gîte in Isère, where he resided. He fought back with his own pistol. He seriously wounded Dilsiz, but he was seriously wounded himself. Neighbours reported the incident but both died of blood loss before paramedics arrived on the scene. Twelve bullet casings were found at the scene.

Gülbey Dilsiz, like Uğurcan Gündoğmuş, was a Zaza gangster from Nazımiye, Tunceli.
