= Kozakura-ikka =

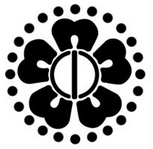
- Daimon of Kozakura-ikka
- Territory: Kagoshima, Kyushu, Japan
- Criminal activities: Protection racketeering, drug trafficking, unlawful involvement in public works and other legitimate businesses, among others

The Kozakura-ikka (小桜一家, Kozakura-ikka) is a yakuza organization based in Kagoshima, Kyushu, Japan, with an estimated 40 active members.

The Kozakura-ikka is noted for its unique official policy, which the National Police Agency describes as the "Kozakura Monroe Doctrine", of not allowing themselves to be active outside of Kagoshima Prefecture, and at the same time not allowing any other yakuza syndicate to enter the prefecture.

== History ==
The Kozakura-ikka was formed in 1948 in Kagoshima as the "Kozakura-gumi" (小桜組) by Seizo Osato who became its first president. After the era of Takashi Katahira's administration, Fumio Jinguji became the third president in 1969, and Kiei Hiraoka became the fourth president in 1988.

== Successive presidents ==
- 1st (1948-) : Seizo Osato (大里 清蔵) a.k.a. Kozakura no Tatsu.
- 2nd : Takashi Katahira (片平 孝)
- 3rd (1969-): Fumio Jinguji (神宮司 文夫)
- 4th (1988-): Kiei Hiraoka (平岡 喜榮) who was 1st kumicho of the Hiraoka-gumi.
