= Kurdish mafia =

Kurdish various organised crime groups

- مافیای کورد
- Territory: Mainly Western Asia and Europe; in addition to North America
- Ethnicity: Kurdish
- Criminal activities: Arms trafficking; contract killing; criminal conspiracy; document forgery; drug trafficking; forced prostitution; extortion; hostage; human trafficking; infiltration of politics; kidnapping; murdering; police impersonation; racketeering; tax evasion; theft; torture; witness intimidation
- Allies: Greek mafia; Armenian mafia; Russian mafia; Iranian mafia; Taliban (formerly)
- Rivals: Turkish mafia

The Kurdish mafia (Kurdish: مافیای کورد, romanized: Mafyayê kurd) are organised crime groups run by ethnic Kurds. Outside of Kurdistan, the mafia spread mainly to countries in Western Asia and Europe, but also to North America and Afghanistan.

== History ==
After the Ottoman Empire entered the World War I, mobilisation was declared. Central authority was weakened towards the end of the war, leading to an increase in banditry behind the front. Some of the Kurds living in the villages in the mountainous areas of the Marash Sanjak, especially in the towns of Elbistan and Pazarcık, formed bandit gangs and put the regional public order in a difficult situation. Towards the end of the First World War, in 1917 and 1918, the activities of bandits brought the commercial and economic life in the sanjak and the towns to a standstill.

The Kurdish mafia is led by ethnic Kurds from all over Kurdistan, sometimes even conducting activities in accordance to tribal tradition, although the majority are from Turkish Kurdistan. The main source of income for the Kurdish mafia is allegedly drug and arms trafficking, as well as contract killing. The Kurdish mafia smuggles weapons and hard drugs all across Europe, and Süleyman Soylu accused them of making over US$1.5 billion per year for the PKK. A British police report revealed that the Tottenham Boys, a Kurdish gang from London, did funnel their profits to the PKK.

Kurdish crime families cooperated with each other. Later, Abdullah Öcalan stated that any PKK member who partook in Kurdish mafia activities was expelled from the group, however ongoing activities are still observed.

The Kurdish mafia also patrolled the Iran–Turkey border from both sides, and charged Afghan migrants a fee to be smuggled into Turkish cities, including Istanbul. They did not recognize the Iran–Turkey border and operated without regards to it. Migrants who were smuggled into Turkey recalled how the Kurdish mafia held strong Anti-Turkish beliefs, and wanted to smuggle as many migrants into Turkey as they could. Their hatred for Turkey was a motivation in addition to money, and they cooperated with Iranian criminals to facilitate the migrant smuggling.

Afghanistan was a stronghold of the Kurdish mafia. Kurdish criminals smuggled opiates from Afghanistan into Iranian Kurdistan, Iraqi Kurdistan, and Syrian Kurdistan, which they would later smuggle into Turkish Kurdistan, and then transport it to Western Europe or Russia through the Balkans. In 2015, the Kurdish mafia trafficking of Afghan opiates were disrupted by the unrest in Turkish Kurdistan. Turkish police cracked down on the Kurdish mafia in the process. The Taliban supplied the Kurdish mafia with opiates in exchange for a tax, and the guarantee that the opiates would not be sold to Kurdish civilians, but to Europeans or Russians only. The Kurdish mafia also paid the PKK a tax to pass through their territory. Despite the Taliban tolerating the opiate trade during their insurgency, they banned it in 2022, as part of their new reforms.

The Albanian mafia was previously dominant in the people smuggling business, although the Kurdish mafia later took over the business, and a few years later, following the refugee crisis after the 2021 Taliban takeover, Afghan criminals dominated the business.

== International activity ==
=== Sweden ===
The Kurdish mafia is also active in Sweden, heavily involved in the drug trade but also bombings, assassinations, robberies, and assaults.

=== France ===
In late 2022, the Kurdish mafia had several camps in Calais, which they used to house the migrants they smuggled. One camp housed around 1,500 people, and was described as being extremely dangerous, with a migrant confirming that the Kurdish mafia controlled both the camp and the trafficking route.

=== USA ===
In Nashville, Tennessee, during the 1990s and 2000s, Kurdish organised criminals began operating in the city. Their main actions were drug distribution and armed burglaries. Jiyayi Suleyman, who was the first Kurdish officer of the Metro Nashville Police Department, was arrested in 2018 for assisting the gang.

=== Germany ===
Kurdish mafia gangs in Germany were also reported to extort German businessmen, making them pay a tax every month in exchange for protection, and even threatening police saying "we outnumber you." German authorities had avoided targeting Kurdish mafia leaders due to fears of streets being filled with Kurdish protestors who will not allow the police to proceed. Some German municipalities even avoided arresting Kurds due to fears of a riot or retaliation.

== Notable Kurdish mafioso ==
- Adnan Yıldırım
- Amar Suloev
- Askar Simitko
- Aslan Usoyan
- Baris Boyun
- Barzan Tilli-Choli
- Baybaşin family
  - Abdullah Baybaşin
  - Hüseyin Baybaşin
  - Mehmet Baybaşin
  - Tekin Kartal
- Behçet Cantürk
- Hacı Karay
- Halil Ay
- Hewa Rahimpur
- Lazım Esmaeili
- Mahmoud Al-Zein
- Milan Jaff
- Rawa Majid
- Savaş Buldan
- Zakhariy Kalashov
- Ömer Lütfü Topal
