= Baybaşin =

Baybaşin is a Turkish surname. It is known for being the surname of the Baybaşin family from Lice, Turkey.

Notable people with the surname include:

- Abdullah Baybaşin, drug trafficker and crime boss
- Hüseyin Baybaşin, drug baron and crime boss
- Mehmet Baybaşin, drug trafficker
