= Illegal drug trade in Turkey =

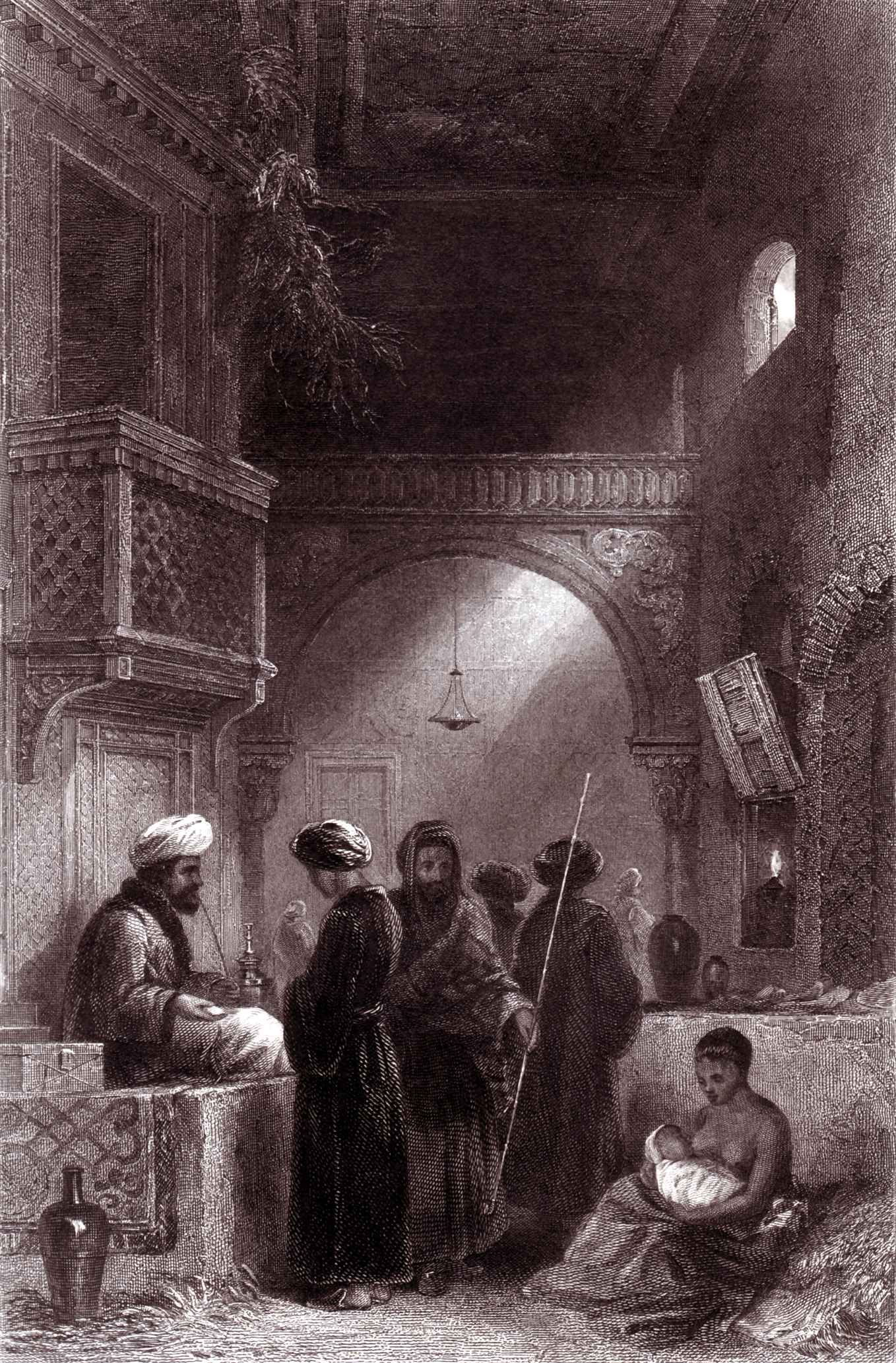
an Ottoman opium seller; engraving from 1850 by Francis William Topham

The illegal drug trade in Turkey has played a significant role in its history. Turkish authorities claim that Drug trafficking has provided substantial revenue for illegal groups such as the Kurdistan Workers' Party (PKK), particularly through marijuana cultivation in south-eastern Turkey, and the 1996 Susurluk scandal showed substantial involvement in drug trafficking on the part of the Turkish deep state. The French Connection heroin trade in the 1960s and 70s was based on poppies grown in Turkey (poppies are a traditional crop in Turkey, with poppy seed used for food and animal fodder as well as for making opium).

Turkish penalties for possession, use and trafficking of illegal drugs are labelled "particularly strict" by the US Embassy in Ankara.

== Opium and heroin production ==
The city of Afyonkarahisar (afyon "poppy, opium", kara "black", hisar "fortress") and its Afyonkarahisar Province was a traditional centre of poppy cultivation. Poppies are a traditional crop in Turkey, with poppy seed used for food and animal fodder as well as for making opium. Already in the early nineteenth century, Turkish opium was being shipped to England and China.

Turkey was not a signatory of the 1912 International Opium Convention and 1925 International Opium Convention, which regulated the sale and production of opioids among other substances. Thus, it become an attractive place for international producers to escape the limitations in Europe and Asia and establish new facilities. From mid 1920's until their closure in the early 1930's three factories specializing in heroin production had been established in Turkey. The first factory was established in 1926 with Japanese capital under the name of "Orient Products Co.". It was followed by ETKİM ve SİCO/TEKTAŞ. The factories were mainly owned by minorities, and had close relationships with international crime syndicates and some Turkish officials such as Hasan Saka. Most of the opioids produced in the factories were exported to Port of Marseille and Alexandria Port, which then distributed globally. It is estimated that the total combined revenue of the three factories made up to 1% of the total Turkish GDP in 1930. The factories stopped their operations in 1931 and 1932 after international pressure.

Turkey signed the Single Convention on Narcotic Drugs in 1961, ratifying it in 1967. It was classed as a "traditional opium producing country" under the Convention. In the 1960s, the French Connection heroin trade was based on poppies grown in Turkey, and Turkey was one of the main opium-producing countries. Under international pressure, Turkey reduced the number of provinces where poppies could be grown from 1967 to 1972, before introducing a total ban. This was overturned in 1974, with the introduction of a system for licensed poppy production and state purchasing of poppies for the legal production of poppy-based medicines. The system appears to have been effective: from 1974 to 2000 no seizures of illegal opium derived from Turkish poppies were reported.

== Trans-shipment ==
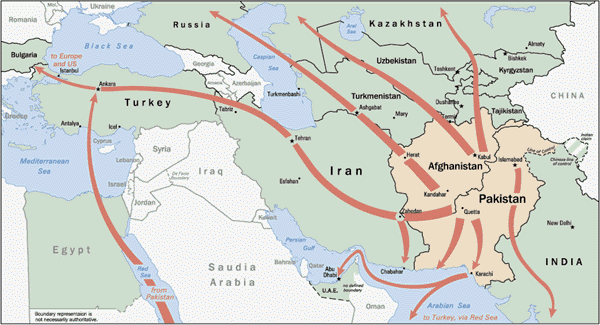
CIA map of heroin flows in Asia, 2007. The European leg, nicknamed "the Balkan route", passes through Turkey.

Due to its strategic geographical location Turkey is a significant trans-shipment point. For example, it is a major route for heroin from Afghanistan to Europe; opium production in Afghanistan has been the highest in the world since 1992 (except for the year 2001). According to Interpol, "Turkey is a major staging area and transportation route for heroin destined for European markets.", and is the "anchor point" for the Balkan Route. The U.S. Drug Enforcement Administration estimated the 1997 volume of the Turkish heroin traffic at 4–6 tons per month.

In 1992/3 the Turkish Navy intercepted two smuggling vessels, in the Kısmetim-1 incident (3 tons of morphine base) and Lucky-S incident (11 tons of marijuana, 2.5 tons of morphine base). Notable Turkish traffickers include Hüseyin Baybaşin (serving life in the Netherlands for trafficking).

=== Susurluk scandal ===
The point of contention of the Susurluk gangs was the European leg of the heroin transportation route, which passes through Turkey. One fifth of the black money is tapped by the gangs as "commission"; a market on the order of $80 billion (1997). According to Doğu Perinçek, the lure of heroin proved irresistible to the state, which suffered a $40–50 billion loss in trade with Iraq due to the U.N. embargo and the Gulf War.

The biggest drug cartel was led by Kurdish drug trafficker Hüseyin Baybaşin. Baybaşin said the most important state official involved in controlling the heroin trade was Şükrü Balcı, who was Istanbul Chief of Police 1979 to 1983.

According to the Independent, the U.K. National Crime Squad had estimated that 90% of the heroin in the United Kingdom was under their control until 2002, when it had a bloody falling-out with its partners in the PKK. He settled in the U.K. after becoming an informer for the HM Customs and Excise office to reveal what he knew, as someone who traveled with a diplomatic passport, about the involvement in heroin trafficking of senior Turkish politicians and officials.

After every single [bank] transaction, certainly half the money would go to the Turkish state. To us it was like a tax in exchange for the all round protection we were getting. If the money was confiscated or we were arrested, our government contacts would come and pick us up and say we were working for the state. Even in Europe, they were still protecting us. When I made my second trip to Europe that year, I saw with my own eyes that all the consulates were in the business. At every consulate, there was a staff member officially assigned to found cultural centres and Turkish schools for example, and we would donate money for them. The Turkish Cultural Association was completely funded by money from the drug trade.

— Hüseyin Baybaşin, Bovenkerk and Yeşilgöz, 1998: 273-4

Another narcotic that was trafficked in significant quantity was Captagon. A notable trafficker was a Turkish businessman Mehmet Ali Yaprak of Gaziantep. Yaprak was ostensibly a businessman with a television channel (Yaprak TV), a radio station, and a tourism company (Hidayet Turizm). However, he also led a feared gang that smuggled Captagon over Syria and Saudi Arabia, according to the MİT report. His tourism company facilitated the trafficking. The report says that Yaprak donated 500 billion Lira (Note: The Turkish lira was experiencing hyperinflation at the time, so it is difficult to translate into foreign currency. The donation was made towards the elections on 24 December 1995, when the interbank rate was 57,700 Lira/$US. At the beginning of the same year, the parity was 38,900 Lira/$US. The contribution is therefore on the order of $8.7 million to $13m.) to support Ağar's DYP campaign. Upon learning of Yaprak's wealth, Çatlı and a team of 6–7 dressed in police uniform kidnapped Yaprak on 25 May 1996 and took him to a house in Siverek belonging to the Bucak clan. The kidnapping, motivated by the desire to know where the Captagon was coming from and cut Topal out of the loop, was directed by police in Ankara. Yaprak paid 10 million DM in ransom, however Çatlı and his fellow kidnappers received only a small portion of this. When they found out that they had been cheated, they fell out with their overlords in Ankara. They then kidnapped Yaprak a second time and interrogated him, sending one copy of the interrogation tape to Bucak and another to Eymür through MİT agent Müfit Sement. Leveraging the tapes, Çatlı worked out an agreement with Ankara.

After Topal's capture, his friend Haluk Koral called Eymür for help. Topal had also been kidnapped by police chief İbrahim Şahin priorly.

Yaprak was convicted in 1997 for involvement in the assassination of Gaziantep Bar lawyer Burhan Veli Torun, and released due to an amnesty law (Turkish: Şartlı Salıverilme Yasası). In 2002, he was re-imprisoned after being caught with 5 million pills of Captagon. He died in prison, January 2004.

A market in the southeast town of Lice was destroyed by fire. Deputy Fikri Sağlar alleged that Lice was a center of drug processing, and that the factory was moved to Elazığ. Sağlar also said that the Turkish backing for the 1995 Azeri coup d'état attempt was over control of the shipment route from Afghanistan.

== See also ==
- Kısmetim-1 incident
- Lucky-S incident
- Susurluk scandal

== Bibliography ==
- 1998 Human Rights Report (PDF). Ankara: Human Rights Foundation of Turkey. 2000. ISBN 975-7217-25-5. Archived from the original (PDF) on 2009-02-05. (contains the Susurluk reports in the annex, and material on the Counter-Guerrilla)
