= List of shipwrecks in 1992 =

The list of shipwrecks in 1992 includes ships sunk, foundered, grounded, or otherwise lost during 1992.

table of contents
1992
Jan	Feb	Mar	Apr
May	Jun	Jul	Aug
Sep	Oct	Nov	Dec
Unknown date

== January ==
=== 5 January ===
List of shipwrecks: 5 January 1964
Ship	State	Description
Saint George	United States	The 77-foot (23 m) crab-fishing vessel disappeared in the Bering Sea with the loss of her entire six-man crew.

=== 7 January ===
List of shipwrecks: 7 January 1992
Ship	State	Description
USS Darter	United States Navy	The decommissioned Tang-class submarine was sunk as a target by the submarine USS Tautog (United States Navy) in the Pacific Ocean off Pearl Harbor, Hawaii.

=== 12 January ===
List of shipwrecks: 12 January 1992
Ship	State	Description
Barbara Leigh	United States	After an outrigger collapsed and caused her to take on a list, the 42-foot (12.8 m) cod trawler sank with the loss of one life off Noyes Island in the Alexander Archipelago in Southeast Alaska.

=== 13 January ===
List of shipwrecks: 13 January 1992
Ship	State	Description
Silver Chalice	United States	The 71-foot (21.6 m) fishing vessel sank in the Gulf of Alaska 60 nautical miles (110 km; 69 mi) east of Kodiak, Alaska. Her entire crew of four survived.

=== 16 January ===
List of shipwrecks: 16 January 1992
Ship	State	Description
Harkness	United States	The 70-foot (21 m) tug sank in approximately 100 feet (30 m) of water off the Zephyr Ledges, a reef near Matinicus Island off the coast of Maine. Her crew of three was rescued.
Valerie E	United States	The 71-foot (21.6 m) fishing trawler and clam dredger sank in 75 feet (23 m) of water in the North Atlantic Ocean off Atlantic Beach, Long Island, New York, during a storm. Her entire crew of three was lost, and their bodies were not recovered.

=== 18 January ===
List of shipwrecks: 18 January 1992
Ship	State	Description
Mahalo	United States	While disabled and under tow, the 83-foot (25.3 m) crab-fishing vessel sank in the Bering Sea near Saint Paul Island. The vessel Sea Producer (United States) rescued her entire crew of four.

=== 24 January ===
List of shipwrecks: 24 January 1992
Ship	State	Description
Silverado	United States	The 32-foot (9.8 m) crab-fishing vessel was wrecked in Beaver Inlet (53°50′N 166°15′W) on the coast of Unalaska Island in the Aleutian Islands. The vessel Sea Spider (United States) rescued her entire crew of three.

=== 28 January ===
List of shipwrecks: 28 January 1992
Ship	State	Description
BRM-42	Croatia	Croatian War of Independence: The diver support boat was sunk by mines off the harbor at Lora in Split, Croatia.

== February ==
=== 1 February ===
List of shipwrecks: 1 February 1992
Ship	State	Description
Josephine Marie	United States	The 80-foot (24 m), 154-gross ton stern trawler sank in heavy seas in 105 feet (32 m) of water in the Stellwagen Bank National Marine Sanctuary 6 nautical miles (11 km; 6.9 mi) off the northern tip of Cape Cod, Massachusetts, at 42°10.925′N 070°13.466′W. Her crew of four abandoned ship wearing survival suits and were rescued by the United States Coast Guard and the fishing dragger Italian Gold (United States).

=== 4 February ===
List of shipwrecks: 4 February 1992
Ship	State	Description
Sea Venture I	United States	The 39-foot (12 m) fishing vessel capsized and sank off Alaska south of Homer near Seldovia. Two of her three crewmen survived.

=== 11 February ===
List of shipwrecks: 11 February 1992
Ship	State	Description
USS Baton Rouge	United States Navy	Submarine incident off Kildin Island: The Los Angeles-class submarine was in collision in the Barents Sea off Kildin Island with the submarine K-276 (Russian Navy). She was consequently withdrawn from service due to damage received and eventually scrapped in 1993.

=== 16 February ===
List of shipwrecks: 16 February 1992
Ship	State	Description
Holy Cross	United States	The 79.9-foot (24.4 m) crab-fishing vessel sank in the Bering Sea near the Pribilof Islands. The fishing vessel El Dan (United States) rescued her crew of five.

=== 22 February ===
List of shipwrecks: 22 February 1992
Ship	State	Description
Lady Ann	United States	The 56-foot (17.1 m) longline fishing vessel sank at Cape Cleare (59°47′N 147°54′W) on the south-central coast of Alaska. Her crew of six survived.

=== 23 February ===
List of shipwrecks: 23 February 1992
Ship	State	Description
Morning Star	United States	The 34-foot (10.4 m) salmon seiner ran aground and sank with the loss of one life at Seldovia Point (59°28′15″N 151°42′00″W) in Cook Inlet on the south-central coast of Alaska.
Sonny Boy	United States	The 93-foot (28 m) fishing vessel capsized and sank in Akun Strait (54°08′N 165°39′W) in the Aleutian Islands after she lost power. Her crew of four survived.

=== 29 February ===
List of shipwrecks: 29 February 1992
Ship	State	Description
Granny Rosa	United States	The 51-foot (15.5 m) salmon seiner capsized and sank in Prince William Sound on the south-central coast of Alaska north of Bligh Island and west of Busby Island (60.8958°N 146.7858°W). Her crew of four survived.

== March ==
=== 3 March ===
List of shipwrecks: 3 March 1992
Ship	State	Description
Fleetwood	United States	The 21-foot (6.4 m) salmon troller ran aground and sank southeast of Shelter Island in the Alexander Archipelago in Southeast Alaska. Her two crewmen swam ashore in survival suits and survived.

=== 25 March ===
List of shipwrecks: 25 March 1992
Ship	State	Description
Silver Star	United States	The 32-foot (9.8 m) fishing vessel ran aground and sank off the coast of Kodiak Island in Whale Pass (57°56′N 152°50′W) toward Kupreanof Strait off the south-central coast of Alaska. She was salvaged and repaired, after which she returned to service with the name Sylvia Star.

=== 27 March ===
List of shipwrecks: 27 March 1992
Ship	State	Description
Capricorn	United States	The 43-foot (13.1 m) fishing vessel burned and sank without loss of life in Kachemak Bay in Cook Inlet on the south-central coast of Alaska.

=== Unknown date ===
List of shipwrecks: Unknown date in March 1992
Ship	State	Description
Vitse-Admiral Drozd	Soviet Union	The Kresta I-class cruiser sank in the Barents Sea whilst being towed to India for scrapping.

== April ==
=== 1 April ===
List of shipwrecks: 1 April 1992
Ship	State	Description
USS Brookings	United States Navy	The Haskell-class attack transport was scuttled off the coast of Puerto Rico.

=== 17 April ===
List of shipwrecks: 17 April 1992
Ship	State	Description
Katina P	Malta	The oil tanker′s captain deliberately ran her aground on the coast of Mozambique 40 kilometres (25 miles; 22.6 nautical miles) north of Maputo. She was soon salvaged.

=== 26 April ===
List of shipwrecks: 26 April 1992
Ship	State	Description
Katina P	Malta	After being salvaged, the oil tanker sank while under tow in the Mozambique Channel northeast of Maputo, Mozambique.

== May ==
=== 6 May ===
List of shipwrecks: 6 May 1992
Ship	State	Description
Aurora	Croatia	The ferry collided with Ilirija (Croatia) in the harbour at Dubrovnik, Croatia, and sank with the loss of 61 of the 86 people on board.

=== 12 May ===
List of shipwrecks: 12 May 1992
Ship	State	Description
Point Sophia	United States	The 60-foot (18.3 m) fishing vessel capsized and sank in Dog Bay Harbor (57°47′20″N 152°24′10″W) at Kodiak, Alaska, after striking a submerged object. All three people on board survived.

=== 17 May ===
List of shipwrecks: 17 May 1992
Ship	State	Description
Dutchess	United States	The 79-foot (24.1 m) fishing vessel sank in the Shelikof Strait near Uganik Bay (57°50′N 153°32′W) on the coast of Alaska′s Kodiak Island. Her crew of four survived. She may have been towed into Port Bailey 57.9301°N 153.0406°W), Alaska, and salvaged.

=== 23 May ===
List of shipwrecks: 23 May 1992
Ship	State	Description
Melody	United States	The 42-foot (12.8 m) longline fishing vessel struck a reef and sank northwest of Baker Island in the Alexander Archipelago in Southeast Alaska after her steering failed. Her crew of two survived.

=== 25 May ===
List of shipwrecks: 25 May 1992
Ship	State	Description
Dolores	United States	The 28-foot (8.5 m) salmon seiner was abandoned after she became disabled in heavy seas in Strawberry Channel (60°24′N 146°03′W) on the south-central coast of Alaska. A United States Coast Guard helicopter rescued her crew of two.

=== 26 May ===
List of shipwrecks: 26 May 1992
Ship	State	Description
Cajun Mama	United States	The 71-foot (21.6 m) fishing vessel flooded from the stern, capsized and sank in the Gulf of Alaska approximately 30 nautical miles (56 km; 35 mi) south-southwest of Cape Cleare (59°50′N 147°50′W) on the south-central coast of Alaska. A United States Coast Guard helicopter rescued all five people aboard.

== June ==
=== 18 June ===
List of shipwrecks: 18 June 1992
Ship	State	Description
Lora Mae	United States	The 42-foot (12.8 m) fishing vessel burned to the waterline and sank in Chignik Bay (56°22′N 158°00′W) on the south coast of the Alaska Peninsula. Her crew of four survived.

=== 21 June ===
List of shipwrecks: 21 June 1992
Ship	State	Description
Active	United States	The 42-foot (12.8 m) cod trawler struck bottom and sank at Grand Island (61°40′N 161°25′W) in the Yukon River in central Alaska. Her crew of two perished.

=== 23 June ===
List of shipwrecks: 23 June 1992
Ship	State	Description
Monster	United States	The 32-foot (9.8 m) fishing vessel burned and sank at the mouth of the Egegik River in Alaska. Her crew survived.

=== 24 June ===
List of shipwrecks: 24 June 1992
Ship	State	Description
Sea Hawk	United States	The 38-foot (11.6 m) fishing vessel sank in the Copper River Delta in Alaska after she struck a submerged reef. Her crew of two survived.

=== 29 June ===
List of shipwrecks: 29 June 1992
Ship	State	Description
Zuess	United States	The tugboat was scuttled as an artificial reef south of Destin, Florida (30°09′N 86°44′W) in 107 feet (33 m) of water in the Gulf of Mexico.

=== 30 June ===
List of shipwrecks: 30 June 1992
Ship	State	Description
Cheryl Suzanne	United States	The 32-foot (9.8 m) crab-fishing vessel sank after striking rocks off Point Couverden (58°11′25″N 135°03′10″W) in Southeast Alaska. The only person aboard survived.

== July ==
=== 5 July ===
List of shipwrecks: 5 July 1992
Ship	State	Description
90% Angel	United States	The 28-foot (8.5 m) salmon seiner sank in a gale with the loss of two lives a few miles south of Graveyard Point (58°52′N 157°01′W) at the mouth of the Kvichak River on the Bristol Bay coast of Alaska. Helicopters from a nearby fish processing plant rescued her two survivors.

=== 9 July ===
List of shipwrecks: 9 July 1992
Ship	State	Description
Kim	United States	The 32-foot (9.8 m) salmon seiner ran aground and sank without loss of life near Egegik, Alaska.

=== 14 July ===
List of shipwrecks: 14 July 1992
Ship	State	Description
Whirl Point	United States	Four or five large waves struck the 32-foot (9.8 m) salmon seiner, flooding and sinking her near Ikatan Point (54°46′30″N 163°11′00″W) on Unimak Island in the Aleutian Islands.

=== 21 July ===
List of shipwrecks: 21 July 1992
Ship	State	Description
Donna B	United States	The 33-foot (10.1 m) fishing vessel capsized and sank at the entrance to the Kenai River on the south-central coast of Alaska. All six people aboard – one of them an infant – survived.

=== 25 July ===
List of shipwrecks: 25 July 1992
Ship	State	Description
Mutual	United States	The 85-foot (25.9 m) longline fishing vessel burned and sank approximately 40 nautical miles (74 km; 46 mi) southeast of Seward, Alaska. The two people on board survived.

=== 26 July ===
List of shipwrecks: 26 July 1992
Ship	State	Description
Selief	United States	The 86-foot (26.2 m) fishing vessel was wrecked on Shag Rock (57°54′30″N 152°47′25″W) in Whale Pass in the Kodiak Archipelago near Kodiak, Alaska.

== August ==
=== 4 August ===
List of shipwrecks: 4 August 1992
Ship	State	Description
USS Indra	United States Navy	The decommissioned Achelous-class landing craft repair ship was sunk as an artificial reef in the Atlantic Ocean off the coast of North Carolina at 34°33′55″N 76°58′30″W

=== 6 August ===
List of shipwrecks: 6 August 1992
Ship	State	Description
Beach Haven	United States	The retired 125-foot (38.1 m) fishing trawler and clam dredger was scuttled as an artificial reef in the North Atlantic Ocean east of Ocean City, New Jersey, at 39°15.340′N 074°14.017′W.

=== 12 August ===
List of shipwrecks: 12 August 1992
Ship	State	Description
Angelia	United States	The 55-foot (16.8 m) salmon seiner flooded and sank in Lisianski Strait (57°50′N 136°27′W) in Southeast Alaska after she lost a hatch cover. Her crew of three survived.
Sand Gull	United Kingdom	The dredger was driven against a jetty and sank at Ventnor, Isle of Wight. She was refloated on 16 August and beached. Consequently scrapped.

=== 13 August ===
List of shipwrecks: 13 August 1992
Ship	State	Description
Lady Anna	United States	The US$10 million, 121-foot (36.9 m) luxury yacht – the world’s largest private sport fishing vessel at the time – sank in five minutes in bad weather with 20-knot (37 km/h; 23 mph) winds and 10-to-12-foot (3 to 4 m) seas in the Atlantic Ocean off southern New Jersey in 428 feet (130 m) of water. The six men on board abandoned ship in a life raft and were rescued by a United States Coast Guard helicopter about 100 nautical miles (190 km; 120 mi) southeast of Cape May, New Jersey, early on 14 August, four hours after Lady Anna sank.

=== 21 August ===
List of shipwrecks: 21 August 1992
Ship	State	Description
Sea Transporter	United States	The retired 135-foot (41.1 m) fishing trawler was scuttled as an artificial reef in the North Atlantic Ocean off Cape May, New Jersey, in 70 feet (21 m) of water at 38°53.118′N 074°40.190′W.

=== 22 August ===
List of shipwrecks: 22 August 1992
Ship	State	Description
USS Mullinnix	United States Navy	The decommissioned Forrest Sherman-class destroyer was sunk as a target.

=== 23 August ===
List of shipwrecks: 23 August 1992
Ship	State	Description
Royal Pacific	Singapore	The cruise ship sank in the Straits of Malacca after being rammed by fishing vessel Turfu 51 (Republic of China) with the loss of two of the 534-plus people on board. Survivors were rescued by Chapaevsk (Russia) and Marisa (Bahamas).

=== 27 August ===
List of shipwrecks: 27 August 1992
Ship	State	Description
USS White Plains	United States Navy	USS White Plains being refloated. The Mars-class combat stores ship broke loose from her moorings in Apra Harbor, Guam, during Typhoon Omar and ran around in a beach near Polaris Point. She was later refloated and returned to service.

=== 28 August ===
List of shipwrecks: 28 August 1992
Ship	State	Description
Loon	United States	The 120-foot (36.6 m) fishing vessel capsized and sank in 600 feet (180 m) of water in Nuka Bay (59°19′N 150°33′W) on the south-central coast of Alaska several hours after striking a submerged rock near Naked Island (60.6528°N 147.4130°W) in Prince William Sound. A United States Coast Guard helicopter rescued her crew of two.

== September ==
=== 1 September ===
List of shipwrecks: 1 September 1992
Ship	State	Description
Tammy K	United States	While under tow, the 32-foot (9.8 m) salmon seiner capsized and sank off Seduction Point (59°04′55″N 135°18′25″W) in Southeast Alaska. One of the two people aboard survived, but the other was lost.

=== 2 September ===
List of shipwrecks: 2 September 1992
Ship	State	Description
Sharyn A	United States	After the 40-foot (12.2 m) salmon troller ran aground in Southeast Alaska, her crew attempted repairs, but she sank without loss of life 30 nautical miles (56 km; 35 mi) southeast of Ketchikan, Alaska.

=== 3 September ===
List of shipwrecks: 3 September 1992
Ship	State	Description
EPC 22	United States	After her engine broke down during a storm, the 28-foot (8.5 m) fishing vessel blew ashore and sank in Bristol Bay on the coast of Alaska.

=== 7 September ===
List of shipwrecks: 7 September 1992
Ship	State	Description
Interceptor	United States	Anchored at low tide with no slack in her anchor cable, the 42-foot (12.8 m) longline halibut-fishing vessel flooded and sank near Flat Island (59°19′45″N 151°59′45″W) in Cook Inlet on the south-central coast of Alaska when the incoming tide swamped her. No one was on board at the time.

=== 11 September ===
List of shipwrecks: 11 September 1992
Ship	State	Description
Mary May	United States	The 41-foot (12.5 m) longline halibut-fishing vessel disappeared without trace near Biorka Island in Southeast Alaska with the loss of her crew of two. The body of one crewman later was discovered in Sitka Bay on the coast of Kruzof Island in the Alexander Archipelago; the other crewman′s body was never found.
Sea Breeze	United States	The 47-foot (14.3 m) longline halibut-fishing vessel disappeared with the loss of her entire three-man crew near Yakutat, Alaska. Later, the body of her captain was found washed ashore on Middleton Island and that of one of her crew members on the shore of Resurrection Bay.

=== 18 September ===
List of shipwrecks: 18 September 1992
Ship	State	Description
Nord	United States	The 38-foot (11.6 m) longline fishing vessel capsized and in less than four minutes after waves broke over her gunwales and her scuppers clogged with fish off Point Couverden (58°11′25″N 135°03′10″W) on the southern tip of Couverden Island at the entrance of Lynn Canal in Southeast Alaska. All five members of her crew survived.

=== 22 September ===
List of shipwrecks: 22 September 1922
Ship	State	Description
Majestic	United States	The 70-foot (21.3 m) longline halibut-fishing vessel capsized and sank in the Bering Sea approximately 70 nautical miles (130 km; 81 mi) south of Saint Paul Island. Her crew of five survived.

=== 28 September ===
List of shipwrecks: 28 September 1922
Ship	State	Description
Bald Eagle	United States	The 37-foot (11.3 m) vessel was wrecked on rocks at Mill Bay Beach (57°49′30″N 152°20′30″W) on the coast of Alaska′s Kodiak Island after her mooring line parted during a storm.

=== Unknown date ===
List of shipwrecks: Unknown date 1992
Ship	State	Description
Rozi	Malta	The wreck of Rozi The tug was scuttled in the Mediterranean Sea off Ċirkewwa (40°39′01″N 14°32′44″W), Malta, to serve as an artificial reef.

== October ==
=== 2 October ===
List of shipwrecks: 2 October 1992
Ship	State	Description
TCG Muavenet	Turkish Navy	The Robert H. Smith-class destroyer minelayer was on a military exercise in Saros Bay when struck by two Sea Sparrow missiles fired by the aircraft carrier USS Saratoga (United States Navy), killing five of her crew. The ship was consequently declared a constructive total loss and scrapped.

=== 12 October ===
List of shipwrecks: 12 October 1992
Ship	State	Description
Emerald Pacific	United States	The 137-gross ton, 107.5-foot (32.8 m) fishing vessel caught fire near Valdez, Alaska. The two people on board abandoned ship in a life raft and were rescued. The fire was extinguished, but Emerald Pacific was declared a total loss.

=== 14 October ===
List of shipwrecks: 14 October 1992
Ship	State	Description
Mary Anne	United States	While tied up side-by-side with the fishing vessel Silver Bullit (United States), which had been towing her, and the vessel New Star (United States), which Silver Bullit also had been towing, to make repairs after Silver Bullit struck a rock, the 29-foot (8.8 m) fishing vessel was destroyed by fire and sank without loss of life near Mitrofania Island (55°53′N 158°50′W) off the south coast of the Alaska Peninsula.
Miss Anngel	United States	The 65-foot (19.8 m) fishing trawler sank approximately 70 nautical miles (130 km; 81 mi) southwest of Kodiak Island, Alaska, after a series of large waves struck and flooded her. Her crew of three survived.
New Star	United States	While tied up side-by-side with the fishing vessel Silver Bullit (United States), which had been towing her, and the fishing vessel Mary Anne (United States), which Silver Bullit also had been towing, to make repairs after Silver Bullit struck a rock, the 49-foot (14.9 m) vessel was destroyed by fire and sank without loss of life near Mitrofania Island (55°53′N 158°50′W) off the south coast of the Alaska Peninsula.
Silver Bullit	United States	After striking a rock and tying up side by side with two vessels she was towing – the fishing vessel Mary Anne and the vessel New Star (both United States) – to make repairs, the 32-foot (9.8 m) fishing vessel was destroyed by fire and sank without loss of life near Mitrofania Island (55°53′N 158°50′W) off the south coast of the Alaska Peninsula.

=== 20 October ===
List of shipwrecks: 20 October 1992
Ship	State	Description
Sea Note	United States	The 35-foot (10.7 m) sea cucumber and sea urchin dive boat sank near Yakutat, Alaska, with the loss of both of her crew members.

=== 22 October ===
List of shipwrecks: 22 October 1992
Ship	State	Description
Daeyang Honey	South Korea	Typhoon Colloeen: The bulk carrier foundered in the Pacific Ocean 300 nautical miles (560 km) east of the Philippines with the loss of all 28 crew.

=== 28 October ===
List of shipwrecks: 28 October 1992
Ship	State	Description
Mayflower	United States	The retired 50-foot (15.2 m) fishing trawler was scuttled as an artificial reef in the North Atlantic Ocean south of Long Island off Shinnecock Inlet, New York.

=== Unknown date ===
List of shipwrecks: unknown October 1992
Ship	State	Description
SLNS Kandula	Sri Lanka Navy	Sri Lankan Civil War: The landing craft was sunk by the Liberation Tigers of Tamil Eelam sometime in October.

== November ==
=== 4 November ===
List of shipwrecks: 4 November 1992
Ship	State	Description
Kasilof	United States	The 65-foot (19.8 m) fishing vessel dragged her anchor, ran aground, and sank near Baranof Island in the Alexander Archipelago in Southeast Alaska. The only person aboard survived.

=== 9 November ===
List of shipwrecks: 9 November 1992
Ship	State	Description
Gulmaid	United Kingdom	The yacht was abandoned off Eastbourne, East Sussex. Her crew were rescued by the Eastbourne Lifeboat Duke of Kent( Royal National Lifeboat Institution). Gulmaid subsequently drove ashore.

=== 17 November ===
List of shipwrecks: 17 November 1992
Ship	State	Description
Princesa	Spanish Navy	The decommissioned Atrevida-class corvette was sunk as a target in the Atlantic Ocean off Galicia, Spain.

=== 22 November ===
List of shipwrecks: 22 November 1992
Ship	State	Description
May	United States	The tug capsized and sank in 300 feet (91.4 m) of water at the mouth of Farragut Bay (57°06′N 133°14′W) in Frederick Sound in the Alexander Archipelago in Southeast Alaska with the loss of three lives. There was one survivor.

=== 30 November ===
List of shipwrecks: 30 November 1992
Ship	State	Description
Arklow Castle	Ireland	The cargo ship ran aground off Les Sables d'Olonne, Vendée, France. She was subsequently declared a constructive total loss.

== December ==
=== 3 December ===
List of shipwrecks: 3 December 1992
Ship	State	Description
Aegean Sea	Greece	The oil tanker exploded and sank off A Coruña, Galicia, Spain.

=== 15 December ===
List of shipwrecks: 15 December 1992
Ship	State	Description
Kismetim-1	Turkey	Suspected of drug-running, the cargo ship was intercepted in the Mediterranean Sea by the submarine rescue vessel TCG Akın, destroyer TCG Savaştepe, and gunboat TCG Yıldırım (all Turkish Navy) and the destroyer USS Briscoe (United States Navy) . She was scuttled by her crew of nine, who were rescued.

=== 18 December ===
List of shipwrecks: 18 December 1992
Ship	State	Description
Cornishman	Spain	The 138.4-foot (42.2 m), 407-ton trawler ran aground east of Faro-Olhao Bar, Portugal and was subsequently abandoned.
Demetrios	Greece	The unmanned cargo ship ran aground at Prawle Point, Devon United Kingdom after her tow parted in a storm.

=== 19 December ===
List of shipwrecks: 19 December 1992
Ship	State	Description
Norsel	Norway	The ship ran aground and was wrecked south-west of Brønnøysund, Norway at (65°24′N 11°58′E). The wreck was delivered to a breaker's yard in Molde, Norway, in February 1993.

=== 23 December ===
List of shipwrecks: 23 December 1992
Ship	State	Description
Titan	Singapore	The floating crane capsized off Camden Head, New South Wales, Australia. She was deemed beyond salvage and was scuttled on 29 December in the Tasman Sea at 31°39′51″S 152°52′24″E.

=== 31 December ===
List of shipwrecks: 31 December 1992
Ship	State	Description
Ken M	United States	The decommissioned harbor tugboat was sunk as an artificial reef off St. Lucie County, Florida in 71 feet (22 m) of water (27°23′00″N 80°02′00″W).

== Unknown date ==
List of shipwrecks: Unknown date 1992
Ship	State	Description
Alfred Jensen	Norway	The cargo ship was scuttled off Norway.
Mr. J	United States	The crab processor – a former PCE-842-class patrol craft and auxiliary minelayer – was towed out into the Pacific Ocean and scuttled sometime in the 1990s.
