= Baybaşin family =

Kurdish criminal organization

The Baybaşins
- Malbata Baybaşîn
- Founded: c. 1960; 66 years ago
- Founder: Mehmet Sait Baybaşin
- Founding location: Lice, Diyarbakır, Turkey
- Years active: 1960s–present
- Territory: Turkey and Western Europe (Belgium, France, Germany, Ireland, Netherlands, United Kingdom)
- Ethnicity: Kurdish
- Membership (est.): 10 permanent members, 20+ hitmen, 550+ "sworn" men (including Tekin Kartal)
- Leader: Abdullah Baybaşin
- Activities: Arms trafficking; criminal conspiracy; document forgery; drug trafficking; hostage; kidnapping; murdering; racketeering; torture
- Allies: Kurdistan Workers' Party; Kurdish mafia
- Rivals: British firms; Turkish mafia

The Baybaşin family (/bˈeɪbɑːʃˌɪn/ bay-bah-SHEEN; Kurmanji Kurdish: Malbata Baybaşîn, pronounced [malbˈɑːtɑː bɑːjbɑːʃin]; Zazaki: Keyeyê Baybaşînî) is a Kurdish crime syndicate. They were once referred to by the European press and the British Home Office as "the most dangerous men in Europe" and are particularly noted for having strong family ties.

Around 1960, Mehmet Sait Baybaşin formed a family union in his hometown of Lice and stepped into criminal activities. In the late 1960s, he died and was replaced by his younger brother Mehmet Şerif Baybaşin. Since the profit of selling opium roots was low, he started to produce heroin in his isolated laboratories and grew his criminal organisation to the extent that it spread to Istanbul.

In the early 1990s, Hüseyin Baybaşin definitively took over the management and business of the family and actively managed it until the 2000s. During this time, he was mentioned in various scandals such as the Kısmetim-1 incident. When a red notice was issued against him in Turkey, he left the country in 1994, never to return. In 1997, his name was announced to the press by the British Home Office and a warrant was issued for his arrest. On 27 March 1998, he was captured in an operation in a mansion in Lieshout, Netherlands.

After the imprisonment of his elder brother Hüseyin Baybaşin, Abdullah Baybaşin temporarily ran the criminal activities until his arrest in 2006. In 2011, Abdullah Baybaşin was freed from HM Prison Belmarsh after a surprise acquittal. In 2012, he returned to Turkey, where he had not set foot for years, and said that this return is permanent. In present-day, Abdullah Baybaşin is the active head of the Baybaşin family.

== Etymology ==
The name beybaş has mainly two different meanings. With the first possibility, it is a combination of the Kurdo-Turkish word bey (بای, lit. 'guy' or 'mr.') and Kurdish word baş (باش, 'good'), meaning 'good guy' or 'mr. good'. With the second possibility, it is a combination of the Ottoman words bēy (بى, 'man') and baš (باش, 'chief'), meaning 'chief man'.

According to some sources, the name baybaş means 'rich', 'prominent', or 'respected person' in Turkish language.

== History ==
The Baybaşin family's criminal roots were laid when Mehmet Sait Baybaşin, who was cultivating cannabis and opium poppy in Lice, Turkey in circa 1960, wanted to establish a trade in this business.

Mehmet Sait Baybaşin was born in Lice in 1935, one of eleven children of Hüseyin Ağa (b. 1908; before the Turkish surname law), a Kurdish farmer and landlord. His father was a village headman and was nicknamed ağa. He died in 1969 (aged 33–34) from an illness that left him bedridden for several years. He led his family until his death and was revered by its members. He had four sons, Mahmut, Hüseyin, Abdullah, and Mehmet.

=== Between 1969 and 1989 ===
Mehmet Şerif "Khalo" (Note: from Kurdish xālo 'Uncle', [xɑːɫoː]) Baybaşin, who became the head of the family in 1969, did not only sell opium roots and seeds, unlike his older brother Sait. He set up an amateur laboratory in an isolated village in Lice, where he succeeded in secretly obtaining morphine base (the raw material for heroin) from opium.

In 1976, Mehmet Şerif Baybaşin's nephew Hüseyin Baybaşin was caught while transporting 24 lb (11 kg) of hashish to Istanbul. On 23 May 1984, Hüseyin Baybaşin was arrested in Dover, United Kingdom, for smuggling drugs internationally using a fake passport and was sentenced to 12 years imprisonment. He was sent from the United Kingdom to Turkey to serve his sentence but was released in 1989.

On 6 May 1988, 476 lb (216 kg) of heroin and 1.9 lb (0.86 kg) of opium poppy belonging to Nizamettin Baybaşin, son of Mehmet Şerif Baybaşin, and intended to be sent by sea to Italy and the Netherlands, were seized in Istanbul.

Mehmet Şerif Baybaşin led the family from 1969 to 1989 and appointed his nephew Hüseyin Baybaşin, who had become increasingly famous in Europe, as his successor.

=== Between 1989 and 1998 ===
Hüseyin Baybaşin became particularly famous after the MV Kısmetim-1 shipwreck, which shook the public order in Turkey.

The Kısmetim-1 which was surrounded by the USS Briscoe-backed Turkish Coast Police, allegedly carrying ~6,800 lb (3,100 kg) of morphine base to be smuggled to Turkey, was sunk by its crew in 1992. The captain, who admitted after police interrogation that he received the order from Baybaşin, did not accept the allegations about the presence of drugs on board. Returning from Karachi, Kısmetim-1 had been tagged by the Turkish Narcotics Branch for some time. According to Police Investigators, the ship was going to export the goods from Karachi to Europe via Turkey.

In 1994, Hüseyin Baybaşin fled to the United Kingdom to join his brother Abdullah Baybaşin and applied for asylum. In 1995, he was arrested in Rotterdam, for dealing in firearms without a licence. Hüseyin and Abdullah moved to North London and chose Amsterdam as their base. In the late 1990s, the Baybaşin brothers controlled 90% of the British drugs market. They were also a major armed threat to other cartels and mafias and no one wanted to "antagonise" them.

The Baybaşin brothers were placed on MI6's blacklist after being declared "the most dangerous men in Europe" by the British Home Office.

=== Between 1998 and 2012 ===
Hüseyin Baybaşin led the family from 1989 until his capture in 1998. Between 1998 and 2002, Abdullah Baybaşin temporarily managed the activities. Hüseyin Baybaşin led the family again from 2002 to 2012, but in 2012 he handed over leadership to his brother Abdullah Baybaşin, who was released in 2011.

Abdullah Baybaşin had an active adolescence in a large family and became involved with drugs in his 20s. In the 1990s he—like his brothers and cousins—was the talk of the European media.

In 2006, Abdullah Baybaşin was convicted of heroin trafficking and imprisoned, but was released from HM Prison Belmarsh in 2011, although he was sentenced to 22 years in prison. In 2012, he arrived in Turkey from the United Kingdom and landed at Ankara Esenboğa Airport. Abdullah Baybaşin adopted a more peaceful lifestyle and settled near the city centre of Diyarbakır.

=== After 2012 ===
In December 2023, an operation was organised against a small gang under the command of Nedim Baybaşin for allegedly blackmailing and threatening many rich and business owners in Istanbul. Turkey's Minister of the Interior Ali Yerlikaya announced on his social media account that a criminal gang led by Nedim Baybaşin had been "broken up" and that Baybaşin and five other gang members had been detained as part of Operation Cage-18. Unlicensed pistols and bullets were seized during searches at the addresses of the gang.

On 4 May 2024, after the murder of the Kurdish gangster Tekin Kartal, a drug trafficker loyal to the Baybaşins, the possible retaliation of the Baybaşin family against their rivals was reported in the Turkish media.

On 29 May 2024, the Hackney Bombers, a Kurdish gang in the United Kingdom under the command of Hüseyin Baybaşin, came to prominence following clashes with the Turkish-controlled Tottenham Turks gang. The Hackney Bombers, armed and financially supported by the Baybaşins, attacked a restaurant owned by Tottenham Turks with a group of masked thugs on motorbikes and AK-47s.

== Members ==
=== Leaders ===
#	Name	Image	Nickname	In leadership	Year of birth	Status	Occupation
1	Mehmet Sait Baybaşin	none	none	c. 1960–1969	1935	Died in 1969	Farmer, then the drug producer
2	Mehmet Şerif Baybaşin	none	Khalo	1969–1989	1944	Alive	Heroin producer in the laboratory
3	Hüseyin Baybaşin		European Pablo Escobar	1989–1998; 2002–2012	1956	Alive	Drug baron
4	Abdullah Baybaşin (current leader)	none	The Heroin Godfather	1998–2002; 2012–present	1960	Alive	Drug trafficker

=== Others ===
Name	Year of birth	Status	Occupation
Mehmet Emin Baybaşin	1942	N/A	Drug dealer
Mahmut Baybaşin	1954	Alive	Drug dealer
Mehmet Baybaşin	1965	Alive	Drug trafficker
Nedim Baybaşin	N/A	Alive	N/A
Nizamettin Baybaşin	1963	Alive	Drug trafficker
Gıyasettin Baybaşin	1976	Alive	Drug dealer
Çağdaş Baybaşin	1985	Alive	N/A
Tekin Kartal	1990	Died in 2024	Drug trafficker

== Family tree ==
Hüseyin Ağa
Mehmet Sait Baybaşin (founder)	Mehmet Emin Baybaşin	Mehmet Şerif Baybaşin (2nd leader)
Mahmut Baybaşin	Hüseyin Baybaşin (3rd leader)	Abdullah Baybaşin (current leader)	Mehmet Şirin Baybaşin	Nedim Baybaşin	Nizamettin Baybaşin
Gıyasettin Baybaşin	Çağdaş Baybaşin

== Wealth ==
The wealth of the Baybaşin family is still a subject of much controversy and debate today. In 1998, the head of the family at that time, Hüseyin Baybaşin, was estimated to have a personal fortune of £10 billion (£19.4 billion in inflation adjusted 2024 pounds). In the same year, the Baybaşin family's total assets were estimated at £38 billion (£73.8 billion in 2024 pounds).

Abdullah Baybaşin argued that his family was not as wealthy as the media claimed, and that he had as much wealth as an average Diyarbakır family. Baybaşin claimed that he earned all of his current fortune from a construction company he founded in Istanbul in 1987, while his earnings from drug trafficking after the 2000s were confiscated by the state. However, according to a report published by the Dutch police at the end of 1998, all movable and immovable property property was laundered by showing that it had been sold to dozens of different people suspected of being Baybaşin members. It was therefore stated that the property could not be confiscated.

== In popular culture ==
In the early 2000s, European and American public opinion repeatedly referred to Hüseyin Baybaşin, the head of the family at that time, as "Europe's Pablo Escobar" or "European Escobar" and strong family relationships were mentioned by commentators.

Robin Plummer, the British prosecutor, made the following statement about Hüseyin Baybaşin and his family:

We watched him for eight months, it was like watching the movie The Godfather. Every day someone new would come and the first thing they would do was kiss Hüseyin Baybaşin's hand. The Baybaşin family terrorized other mafias in the UK for many years.

The Baybaşin family was once referenced in the Valley of the Wolves (2003–2005), Turkey's most popular TV series about the mafia.

== See also ==
- Illegal drug trade in Turkey
- Kurdish mafia
