= Greek mafia =

Various organized crime elements originating from Greece

- Founding location: Greece
- Territory: Greece, Albania, Netherlands, Italy, Kazakhstan, United Kingdom, Bulgaria, United States, Cyprus, South Africa
- Ethnicity: Greek, Greek Cypriots
- Criminal activities: Drug trafficking, arms trafficking, assassination, assault, bank fraud, bankruptcy, blackmailing, bribery, bombing, cigarette smuggling, contract killing, extortion, fraud, entryism, human trafficking, illegal gambling, insurance fraud, kidnapping, money laundering, murder, police corruption, political corruption, protection racket, racketeering, tax evasion, witness intimidation, witness tampering
- Allies: Albanian mafia; American Mafia; Armenian mafia; Georgian mafia; Kurdish mafia; Baybaşin family; Serbian mafia; Sacra Corona Unita; Philadelphia Greek Mob; Velentzas crime family

Greek mafia (Greek: Ελληνική μαφία, romanized: Ellinikí mafía (Note: The English term "Greek Mafia" tends to be preferred by the local Press and journalists, over the native name "Ελληνική μαφία", even within Greek language context.)) is the colloquial term describing various large-scale organized crime elements originating in Greece or operated by Greeks. Indigenous organized criminal groups are well-established in the largest Greek urban centers, particularly in Athens.

Mafia groups in Greece take part in, among other crimes, racketeering, the illegal smuggling of oil, money laundering, cigarette smuggling, weapon and drug trafficking, kidnapping and murder. The domestic criminal syndicates additionally collaborate with Albanian, Romanian and Serbian mafia groups who operate in Greece.

== Godfathers of the night ==
Greek crime bosses are locally described as "godfathers of the night" (Greek: νονοί της νύχτας). Greek organised criminals often operate as owners of nightclubs, and run their illegal businesses from these locations.

In contrast to the Sicilian Mafia or the Albanian mafia, Greek criminal groups follow the same structure as organized gangs within Le Milieu in France or the penose in the Netherlands. Domestically, Greek organised criminals usually operate in smaller organized crime cells, usually family-based. These cells sometimes collaborate, but many feud with one another.

There are close to 217 known domestic crime lords operating in Greece. Internationally, the smuggling and racketeering operations of Greek crime groups have a larger reach, and do not necessarily involve Greek nationals alone. With the need to infiltrate and manipulate multiple types of businesses in order to successfully smuggle internationally, more often than not such organisations resemble professional international cartels rather than traditional organised crime groups.

== Activities ==
Organised crime exists throughout the entirety of Greece; a substantial portion of Greek organised crime groups are centered in Athens; however many other organised or semi-organised groups operate throughout other cities and smaller villages. Mafia groups in the bigger cities especially are involved in racketeering, the illegal smuggling of oil, money laundering, cigarette smuggling, weapon and drug trafficking (including marijuana and hashish), kidnapping and murder. Greek criminal groups have also profited from the activities of corrupt officials.

Arms, narcotics and illegal oil are smuggled by Greek criminal organizations, often in collaboration with Albanian or Russian mafia groups, from local seaports to important destination centers such as the docks of Naples or Antwerp. Regional family-based crime clans operate on the island of Crete and are involved in the cultivation and trafficking of marijuana on both a domestic and international level. Drug criminals operate from small villages, such as Zoniana, from which criminals including the Parasyris family operate.

Greek organised crime groups are also active in other parts of Europe. Some European cities outside of Greece are affected by Greek organized crime in the form of narcotics smuggling. Recently, under pressure from the European Union, Greece and other European countries stepped up their efforts to crack down on smuggling, making numerous arrests and otherwise disabling the organizations in collaboration with European law enforcement agencies.

With Greece holding a large percentage of the world's maritime merchant shipping, a substantial amount of Greek-grown marijuana is shipped throughout Europe on a yearly basis. This marijuana is grown on remote farms and fields, mainly on the island of Crete and the Peloponnese peninsula.

== Outside Greece ==
=== Netherlands ===
The Netherlands has a "policy of tolerance" towards drug use, including the use of cannabis, although the cultivation and transportation of cannabis remains illegal. This creates high demand for smuggling, and the Netherlands consequently is targeted by many international (and often untraceable) smuggling rings. This is excacerbated by the extensive use of maritime merchant ships, and their difficult to regulate and inspect cargo. It is speculated that cartels based in Greece conduct a large portion of this smuggling. However, prosecuting the members of such cartels is difficult due to the non-hierarchical nature of the organisation or organisations involved.

=== North America ===
North American cities with a large Greek community have traditionally also been home to ethnic Greek criminal organizations. Well-known ones include the Velentzas crime family, the Philadelphia Greek Mob, and the Georgakopoulos–Psihogios-Voidonikolas–Leoutsakos Laconian Canadian families. These organizations operated for decades, and were influential in some neighborhoods.

In the United States, the term "Greek mafia" may include or refer specifically to various Greek–American organized crime groups. Notable ethnic Greek or Greek–American organized crime groups in the United States include the Philadelphia Greek Mob in Philadelphia, Pennsylvania and the Velentzas crime family in New York City. Greek–American crime groups vary in the extent of their connections to Greek mafia groups in Europe; some Greek–American crime groups may be only loosely connected or even completely independent of Greek mafia groups in Europe, while certain Greek–American crime groups may essentially be American extensions of Greek mafia groups in Europe.

Greek members of organised crime have always been good at working with other ethnic groups along with their own local Greek groupings, which can at times give them an advantage over other organisations. There was also a Greek–American presence in the Italian–American Chicago Outfit. The most senior non-Italian gangster in the Outfit was Gus Alex, whose family emigrated to Chicago from the village of Alpochori in Achaea. The Chicago Outfit, unlike New York City's Five Families, has a long standing tradition, dating back to Al Capone, of allowing non-Italian associates into positions of real importance and power. Gus Alex was the highest ranking non-Italian wiseguy, as he reportedly formed a three-man ruling panel in the late sixties and early seventies. The three-man ruling panel, consisting of a Greek and two Italians, ran the Chicago Outfit for an unknown period of time.

The most infamous Greek–American gangster is Michael Thevis, a multi-millionaire pornographer and convicted murderer based in Atlanta, Georgia, but with close links to the Five Families and the DeCavalcante crime family of Newark, New Jersey. Thevis's use of unnecessary violence against both real and imagined enemies and competitors was so extreme that he was compared to the character of Tony Montana from the 1983 movie Scarface.

=== Africa ===
In Africa, a small Greek crime syndicate ran casinos throughout the region of middle Africa and in South Africa throughout the 1980s and 1990s. Gambling has always been a staple of Greek organised crime, as well as horse racing, cards, casinos and black market dealings. It is safe to assume that Greek organised crime is difficult to disintegrate, since these groups form, break up and reform when it suits their interests. For this reason, it is often compared to the Italian Camorra, which at times has operated via a similar model, although Greek organised crime relies mainly on smuggling whereas the Italian Camorra relies mainly on extortion and racketeering.
