= Şükrü Balcı =

Şükrü Balcı (1929, Divriği - 6 May 1993, USA) was a Turkish high-ranking civil servant, governor and chief of police. He had a law degree from the Law School of Ankara University. He served as the Istanbul Chief of Police from 1979 to 1983 (a period including the 1980 Turkish coup d'état), and previously he also served as the deputy chief of police in Istanbul in 1972 and 1977. He was believed to have strong influence and links with the Turkish mafia.

In the late 1970s Balcı was indicted for suspected arms smuggling and acquitted. This did not appear to harm his career. According to Turkish-Kurdish drug lord Hüseyin Baybaşin who was arrested by Sukru Balci, Balcı was at the time the most important state official working with the DEA in controlling the transshipment of heroin through Turkey. Balcı was accused in Mehmet Eymür's 1987 MIT Report on coordinating links between police, politicians and the mafia, and investigations into the state-mafia connections revealed by the 1996 Susurluk scandal also mentions about Balcı. In 2013 Turkish Police Academy, was dedicated to his name Sukru Balci .
