= Hasan Özdemir =

Turkish politician

Hasan Özdemir (born 1 January 1947 in Oğuzeli) is a Turkish former police chief and politician. He was Istanbul Chief of Police from 1997 to 2000 and 2001 to 2003, and had previously been Chief of Police in a number of other provinces, including Ankara and Malatya, and governor of Ardahan Province. He was elected to the Grand National Assembly of Turkey in 2007 for the Nationalist Movement Party (MHP).
