= Tekin Kartal =

Turkish drug trafficker (1990–2024)

- Born: İlmettin Aytekin; 1990; Kulp, Turkey
- Died: 4 May 2024 (aged 33–34); Barcelona, Spain
- Cause of death: Assassination by firearm
- Citizenship: Turkey; Germany
- Relatives: Baybaşin family

Tekin Kartal (born İlmettin Aytekin, 1990 – 4 May 2024) was a Turkish drug trafficker and gangster.

== Life ==
Tekin Kartal was born in 1990 in Kulp, Turkey. His birth name is İlmettin Aytekin and his family is of Kurdish origin.

In his early 20s, he emigrated to Germany in poverty. There he met Nizamettin Baybaşin, the key figure who would change his life, and established close ties with the Baybaşin family. He was also in close contact with Abdullah Baybaşin, the leader of the family.

=== Assassination ===
Kartal, who also held German citizenship, flew from Düsseldorf to Barcelona to settle a dispute in the last days of April 2024.

On 4 May 2024, he was assassinated by an unknown masked hitman near the El Maresme–Fòrum metro station in Barcelona. The attacker escaped and an autopsy revealed five bullet wounds to Kartal's head and neck.

Following the assassination of Tekin Kartal, the Turkish media reported on possible retaliation by the Baybaşin family against their rivals.
