= Robert P. Briscoe =

United States Navy admiral (1897–1968)

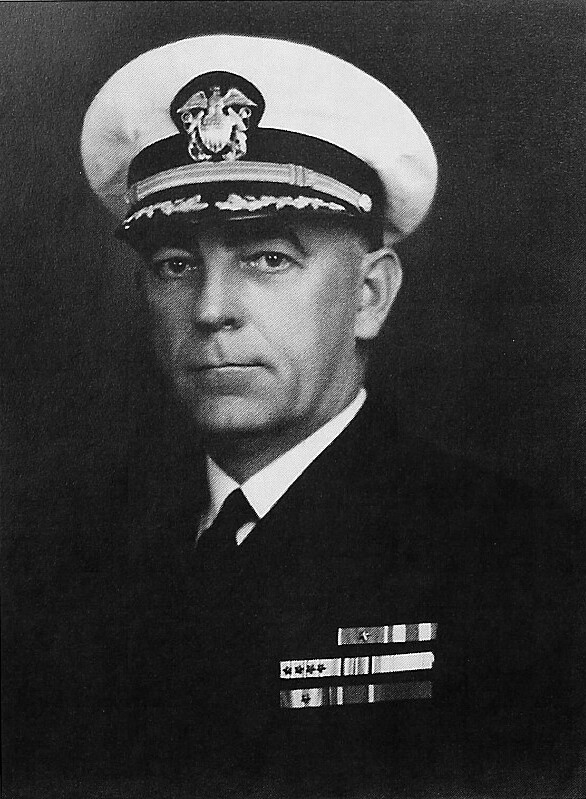
- Briscoe in the 1940s
- Born: Robert Pearce Briscoe; February 19, 1897; Centreville, Mississippi, U.S.
- Died: October 14, 1968 (aged 71); Liberty, Mississippi, U.S.
- Burial place: Arlington National Cemetery, Arlington, Virginia, U.S.
- Spouse: Katherine Lewis
- Military career
- Branch: United States Navy
- Service years: 1918–1959
- Rank: Admiral
- Service number: 0-34560
- Commands: Numerous
- Conflicts: World War I World War II; Korean War
- Awards: Navy Cross; Army Distinguished Service Medal; Navy Distinguished Service Medal; 2x Legion of Merit and Combat "V"

Robert Pearce Briscoe (February 19, 1897 – October 14, 1968) was an admiral of the United States Navy. He commanded two ships, a destroyer squadron, and an amphibious group during World War II. He later served as Commander-in-Chief, Allied Forces Southern Europe, from 1956 to 1959. He was a native of Centreville, Mississippi born February 19, 1897, to Pearce and Alice Briscoe.

== Military career ==
=== World War I and between the wars ===
According to the New York Times, Briscoe became interested in the Navy when he saw USS Mississippi (BB-23) sailing the Mississippi River near his home in 1910. Admiral Briscoe graduated from the United States Naval Academy in June 1918. During World War I he served on the battleship USS Alabama (BB-8) of the U.S. Atlantic Fleet and on the destroyer USS Roe (DD-24), operating from Brest, France. At the end of hostilities, he made the first postwar Midshipmen cruise in the USS Kearsarge (BB-5) and in 1919 returned to destroyer duty as engineer officer of the USS Humphreys (DD-236), stationed in Near East waters at Constantinople. During the Turko-Greek fighting in 1920–1921, he commanded a naval landing force at Derindge, Turkey.

After further destroyer duty in the USS Flusser (DD-289) and USS Henderson (AP-1), and recruiting duty at Little Rock, Arkansas, he served as Senior Assistant Engineer of the battleship USS West Virginia (BB-48) from 1926 to 1929, then returned to the Naval Academy as an instructor in Mechanical Engineering. From 1931 to 1933 he was on China Station, assigned first as executive officer of the USS Edsall (DD-219), on Yangtze River patrol during the Japanese occupation of Woosung and Manchuria, and later as Communication Officer of the USS Houston (CA-30), flagship of the Commander in Chief, Asiatic Fleet. He again returned to the Naval Academy in June 1934, and for three years served as head of the Department of Chemistry.

Sea duty as navigator of the battleship Mississippi (BB-41) preceded a tour during the pre-war period as assistant director of the U.S. Naval Research Laboratory and Navy Department Liaison Officer with the National Defense Research Committee. He has been identified as one of the pioneers of modern electronics development in the Navy.

=== World War II ===
In May 1942, he assumed command of the USS Prometheus (AR-3), a recommissioned World War I repair ship. Under his command, she joined the U.S. 3rd Fleet at Noumea, New Caledonia, where he was detached to command Destroyer Squadron 5 and operated as escort commander for Task Forces 67, 68 and 70. In the intervening periods when the battleships and cruisers were not at sea, Admiral Briscoe operated Commander Task Group 675 (Cactus Striking Force) in Guadalcanal waters.

He was transferred to command of the USS Denver (CL-58) in July 1943 and was in command during the Northern Solomon Islands campaign. During a thirty-six-hour battle with Japanese naval forces, his ship assisted in the sinking of five enemy warships, damaging four others and routing the enemy's surface forces. His ship's guns had barely fired their last salvo when she was attacked by sixty-seven dive bombers. Under his command, the ship downed seventeen enemy planes and thwarted the raid. He sailed the cruiser to the United States after she suffered severe battle damage off Rabaul in November 1943.

In February 1944, he joined the staff of the Commander in Chief, U.S. Fleet, in Washington, D.C., as head of New Developments, and with his promotion to flag rank in April 1945, assumed command of Amphibious Group 14. Victory over Japan Day found him in Manila, working on plans for the invasion of the Japanese homeland.

=== Post-war ===
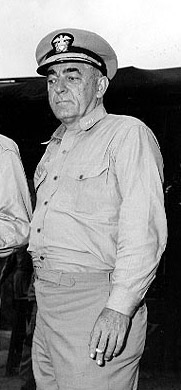
VADM Robert Briscoe, 1952

In September 1945, he took command of the Operational Development Force, Atlantic Fleet with headquarters at Norfolk, Virginia. After two years there, and a tour of duty as Assistant Chief of Naval Operations (Readiness), he became Commander Amphibious Force, Atlantic Fleet, on November 1, 1950.

Ordered in January 1952 to command the U.S. 7th Fleet in Korean waters, he retained this command until designated Commander Naval Forces, Far East, in June of that year. During this tenure, he recommended an amphibious feint to draw North Korean combatants from their dug-in front line positions to cover potential landing zones. This resulted in a significant shift of troop concentrations by enemy forces over a period of three months.

Two years later, he reported as Deputy Chief of Naval Operations, for Fleet Operations and Readiness, and on 2 July 1956, became Commander in Chief, Allied Forces, Southern Europe.

=== Decorations and awards ===
- Navy Cross for actions in the Northern Solomon Islands campaign.
- Army Distinguished Service Medal for his service as Senior Commander of all naval forces in the Far East Command, June 4, 1952, to March 31, 1954.
- Navy Distinguished Service Medal in his capacity as CinC of Allied Forces, Southern Europe from July 2, 1956, to December 31, 1958.
- Legion of Merit for January 19 – February 1, 1943, Guadalcanal and a Gold Star in lieu of a second award of the Legion of Merit with Combat "V" for March 5 – 6, 1943 as Commander of Task Group 68.5, Solomon Islands.

== Civilian life ==
On January 1, 1959, he was transferred to the Retired List of the United States Navy. He retired to Beech Grove Plantation, Liberty, Mississippi, worked on its restoration and raised cattle. Beech Grove was the Lewis family (his wife) home and is now on the National Register of Historic Places as the Thomas Batchelor House. Briscoe was said to be "a hunting enthusiast and an avid collector of antiques." He died on October 14, 1968, at his home near Liberty, Mississippi of an apparent heart attack. He was survived by his wife Katherine (Lewis), sister Marquerite Briscoe and brothers William and Beverly Briscoe. He was buried with full military honors in Arlington National Cemetery on October 18, 1968, in section 2, grave 3387-c. In May 1978, his wife Katherine Lewis-Briscoe (1897–1978) was buried there as well.

== See also ==
- USS Briscoe (DD-977)
