= Necdet Menzir =

Turkish politician

Necdet Menzir (1945 in Bursa – 2 February 2013) was a Turkish bureaucrat and politician who served as Minister of Transport from 1997 to 1998, having been Istanbul Chief of Police (1992–1995). He died from respiratory failure at an Istanbul hospital on 2 February 2013, at the age of 68.
