= Katina P =

Greek oil tanker that sank in 1992

Coordinates: 25°35′S 32°59′E

Katina P was a Greek oil tanker carrying 72,000 tonnes of oil which sank off the coast of Mozambique on 26 April 1992.

The tanker, travelling from Venezuela to the Persian Gulf, lost a hull plate during a storm and was deliberately run aground on 17 April 1992, spilling some of the oil she carried. Her remaining oil was intended to be transferred to another tanker, but she buckled and sank whilst being towed.

Environmental and socio-economic problems followed the oil spill, and the government of Mozambique received $4.5 million in compensation. Investigations revealed considerable negligence on the part of the owners and the captain of Katina P.

== Sinking ==
On 17 April 1992, the master of the Greek-owned, Maltese-flagged vessel Katina P deliberately ran the ship aground 40 kilometres (25 mi) north of Maputo in Mozambique and then abandoned ship. The tanker, which had been under way from Venezuela to the Persian Gulf, had lost a hull plate during a storm. Two of the vessel's tanks had ruptured and spilled some 13,000 tonnes of #6 heavy fuel oil in the Mozambique Channel. A further 3,000 tonnes leaked from the ship while it was aground.

The South African tugboat John Ross, was contracted by the firm Pentow Marine to tow the broken tanker into the Mozambique Channel where the remaining oil would be transferred to another tanker. During the tow Katina P buckled amidships and on 26 April 1992 sank in 2,000 metres (6,600 ft) of water, 173 km (107 mi) from the Mozambican coast and 440 km (270 mi) north-east of Maputo. It is not clear why the oil transfer was not done at an early stage of the tow, as time was of the essence. The south-moving Agulhas current spread the spilled oil into Maputo Bay, the estuaries of Incomati and Matola rivers, mangrove swamps of Montanhana and Catembe, beaches of Catembe, Polana, Costa do Sol and Bairro dos Pescadores, Xefinas Island, and many more with disastrous environmental and socio-economic effects.

Compensation of $10.7 million was claimed, but finally only $4.5 million was paid to the government of Mozambique. Mozambique's lack of expertise in maritime claims and its not being a member of the International Maritime Organization were cited as reasons for the small compensation figure. The payment had consequently been made in terms of the voluntary compensation scheme operated by the oil industry itself, and known as TOVALOP. Investigations following the disaster revealed considerable negligence on the part of the owners and the captain of Katina P. The unseaworthy tanker had been scheduled for demolition, and was on its way from Rio de Janeiro to Bangladesh where it was to be broken up. While crossing the Atlantic it was instructed to put about and load fuel oil in Venezuela destined for Fujirah in the United Arab Emirates.

Some 5,000 tankers per year were being routed through the Mozambique Channel in 1999. Of these, 1,200 were Very Large Crude Carriers, each carrying at least 200,000 tonnes. Along this vulnerable stretch of coastline there is no contingency plan for marine pollution, nor is there legislation covering compensation for spill damage.

== Other uses ==
The name Katina P was also used for a Greek cargo steamer of 1,216 tons built in 1900 by Mackie & Thomson of Govan, and named Roman. In 1906 she was renamed Prince Leopold of Belgique and in 1923 Anastasios. In 1927 she was renamed L. Fafalios and in 1929 Maria. In 1939 she was renamed Katina P for G.J. Papayannakis of Piraeus in Greece. On 7 May 1941, during the German invasion of Greece, she was bombed and sunk by German aircraft at Astakos, Greece.

== See also ==
- List of oil spills
