= Kısmetim-1 incident =

1992 sinking of a cargo ship by the crew

On 15 November 1992, the Turkish merchant ship MV Kısmetim-1 (from Turkish 'My Destiny'), returning from Karachi, Pakistan, was sunk by its crew in the international waters of the Mediterranean Sea after being surrounded by the USS Briscoe-backed Underwater Offence (SAT) team. It was on the list of the Turkish Narcotics Branch because it was suspected of carrying about ~6,800 lb (3,100 kg) of base morphine to be smuggled into Turkey. Since the alleged drugs were never seized, it remained a scandal in the media.

The ship, licensed in the name of Turkish shipowner Osman Ayanoğlu, was supposedly carrying goods belonging to Hüseyin Baybaşin and Şeyhmus Daş. The captain, who did not take initiative during the police interrogation, cited Hüseyin Baybaşin's orders as the reason for the sinking. According to the allegations, Baybaşin, who did not want the drugs to fall into the hands of the police, reached the captain via satellite phone and ordered him to sink the ship.

== Background ==
On 7 October 1991, MV Kısmetim-1 set sail from Gulf of İzmit to Karachi, Pakistan, to carry paint material. As the ship docked at the destination port, Celal Kambur, the ship's purser started a conversation with the port policeman Yousuf Chacha. The Pakistani policeman asked the Turkish crew member to deliver a package to Ajman, a port in the United Arab Emirates. The package contained 23 lb (10 kg) heroin at a price of US$1 per gram.

Soon after leaving the Port of Karachi, the captain received a radio message saying that the ship's owner Osman Ayanoğlu was ambushed and murdered. On the way to Port of Ajman before dawn, the captain was ordered to pick up goods from a motorboat on the high sea, which docked the ship. More than 100 sacks were pulled up into the ship in the darkness. The captain told the crew that the sacks contained nuclear material for the Mechanical and Chemical Industry Corporation.

The ship arrived in Ajman to unload fertilizer. Celal Kambur met the Pakistani drug dealer and received the money in a restaurant. The delivery of the drug package took place at 23:00 local time the same day by throwing it into a boat, which pulled alongside the ship.

The next morning, police raided the ship and found US$10,000 from the drug trade on Celal Kambur. He was tried and found guilty for the drug crime. The ship moored at the port for six months during the trial and was only allowed to leave as the trial ended, and Celal Kambur was imprisoned.

Celal Kambur served his heavy prison sentence and was pardoned after nine years by the emir of Ajman, one of the seven emirates of the UAE federation.

== Operation ==
Since its departure from Karachi, the ship was under close surveillance by the United States DEA, which was forwarding all the relevant information to the Turkish Police. The incident in Ajman was very disappointing for the US and Turkish law enforcement services since they feared the main smuggle would have been revealed.

Finally, the ship passed through the Suez Canal and sailed into the Mediterranean Sea. Three Turkish Navy warships, the frigate TCG Yıldırım (F 243), the destroyer TCG Savaştepe (D 348), the submarine rescue ship TCG Akın (A 585) and the US destroyer USS Briscoe (DD-977) carrying Turkish and US narcotic policemen as well as maritime patrol aircraft of type P-3 Orion deployed from Sicily intercepted the ship in high sea before she tried to escape to Cyprus, a country, which Turkey has no good international relations with. Following the four days lasting joint operation, the ship went down with all its load, the nine crew were rescued.

The US and Turkish officials claimed that the crew deliberately sank the ship in order to prevent the capture of the drug load. The ship's crew denied this allegation before the court declaring that the ship sank due to rough sea.

The operation was led on site by Necdet Menzir, director of Istanbul Police Department and Mestan Şener, head of the narcotics bureau. Mehmet Ağar, director general of the Turkish Police and Ismet Sezgin, minister of interior, were in command of the operation.

== Aftermath ==
Şeyhmus Daş was shot to death on December 25, 1992 in Istanbul in his car when he was on the way to a wedding ceremony along with his wife and two daughters. The killing occurred ten days after the Kısmetim-1 incident and two weeks before the Lucky-S incident, another drug smuggling operation on the sea.

Nejat Daş, son of Şeyhmus Daş, who had carried out the drug trade negotiations in Karachi on behalf of his father, was tried at the 2nd State Security Court (DGM) in Istanbul and found guilty of drug trafficking. He was charged with 5 years and 10 months of heavy prison sentence. He escaped the prison on November 8, 1994, as he was brought from Sinop Fortress Prison to the 1st DGM in Istanbul for trial due to his involvement in the Lucky-S incident.

== In popular culture ==
Turkish TV series Valley of the Wolves features this ship as Nasibim-1 in a drug-related incident.

== See also ==
- Lucky-S incident
