= Istanbul Chief of Police =

The Istanbul Chief of Police (Turkish: İstanbul Emniyet Müdürü) is the head of the General Directorate of Security (Turkish National Police) of the Istanbul Province. Together with the Ankara Chief of Police it is traditionally the most important position in the Turkish police after the General Director of the General Directorate of Security.

== List ==
- Ekrem Baydar (1926)
- Fehmi Vural (1932–1935)
- Salih Rıza Kılıç (1935–1938)
- Sadrettin Aka (1938–1939)
- Muzaffer Akalın (1939–1941)
- O. Selahattin Korkut (1941)
- Kâmuran Çuhruk (1941–1942)
- Haluk Nihat Pepeyi (1942–1943)
- Ahmet Demir (1943–1947)
- Ahmet Sebati Ataman (1947)
- İsmail Hakkı Baykal (1947–1949)
- Cemal Göktan (1949–1950)
- Kemal Aygün (1950–1952)
- Ahmet Tekelioğlu (1952–1953)
- Ethem Yetkiner (1954–1955)
- Alaettin Eriş (1954–1955)
- Hayrettin Nakipoğlu (1955–1958)
- Cemal Tarlan (1958-1958)
- Faruk Oktay (1958–1960)
- Abdülvahit Erdoğan (1960)
- Nevzat Emre Alp (1960–1961)
- Necati İşcen (1961)
- Mustafa Necdet Uğur (1961–1963)
- Haydar Özkın (1963–1967)
- Muzaffer Çağlar (1967–1971)
- Nihat Aslantürk (1971–1972)
- Ahmet Paftalı (1972–1973)
- Arif Yüksel (1973)
- Mehmet Akzambak (1974–1976)
- Nihat Kaner (1977)
- Nazmi İyibil (1977–1978)
- Hayri Kozakçıoğlu (1978–1979)
- Şükrü Balcı (1979–1983)
- Mustafa Yiğit (1983–1984)
- Ünal Erkan (1984–1988)
- Hamdi Ardalı (1988–1990)
- Mehmet Ağar (22 October 1990 - 14 February 1992)
- Necdet Menzir (14 February 1992 - 2 November 1995)
- Orhan Taşanlar (2 November 1995 - 18 April 1996)
- Kemal Yazıcıoğlu (18 April 1996 - 3 January 1997)
- Ramazan Er (24 January 1997 - 4 August 1997)
- Hasan Özdemir (5 August 1997 - 7 August 2000)
- Kazım Abanoz (17 August 2000 - 8 June 2001)
- Hasan Özdemir (8 June 2001 - 5 March 2003)
- Celalettin Cerrah (4 March 2003 - 29 June 2009)
- Hüseyin Çapkın (29 June 2009 - 19 December 2013)
- Selami Altınok (19 December 2013 - 31 August 2015)
- Mustafa Çalışkan (2 September 2015 - 16 June 2020)
- Zafer Aktaş (16 June 2020 - 6 December 2024)
- Selami Yıldız (6 December 2024 – present)
