= Lucky-S incident =

Drug Bust

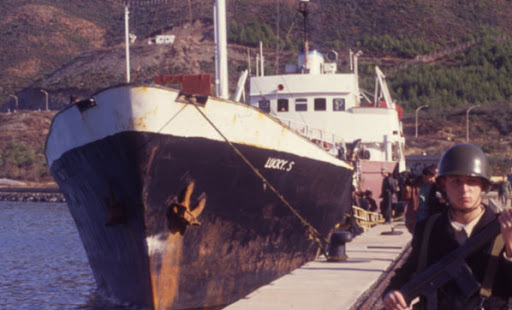
Lucky-S, 1993

The Lucky-S incident occurred on January 7, 1993, when Turkish Navy vessels, carrying members of the Turkish Narcotic Police, intercepted the MV Lucky-S, a Turkish ocean freighter in international waters in the Mediterranean Sea. The ship was suspected of being involved in smuggling illegal drugs into Turkey.

It was the second Turkish anti-drug-smuggling operation on the high seas in three weeks, following the Kısmetim-1 incident. 11,039.550 kg (24,338.04 lb) cannabis and 2,568.010 kg (5,661.49 lb) morphine base were captured on the ship, which was escorted to a Turkish port.

== Trial ==
Eleven people arrested as a result of the operation were convicted of involvement in the drug trade. Şeyhmus Daş, who was also found to have organized drug trafficking with Kısmetim-1 and was imprisoned, escaped from custody on November 8, 1994, as he was brought from the Sinop Fortress Prison to the 1st State Security Court in Istanbul for trial over his involvement in the Lucky-S incident. On March 16, 1995, he was sentenced in absentia to 24 years imprisonment in a maximum-security prison.

It was alleged that the drugs on the ship belonged mostly to the Turkish drug lord Halil İbrahim Havar, son of the arms trafficker. He was tried and sentenced to 30 years imprisonment. He is serving his sentence in the maximum-security Uşak Prison.

== In popular culture ==
In Valley of the Wolves, a Turkish television series, Lucky-S was seen carrying drugs and was featured as Şanslı-S.

== See also ==
- Kısmetim-1 incident
