= Mehmet Baybaşin =

Turkish drug trafficker

- Born: Mehmet Şirin Baybaşin; 1965 (age 60–61); Lice, Turkey
- Citizenship: Turkey
- Relatives: Hüseyin Baybaşin (brother); Abdullah Baybaşin (brother)
- Family: Baybaşin family
- Status: In prison

Mehmet Şirin Baybaşin (born 1965) is a Turkish drug trafficker. He is a notable member of the Baybaşin family. He was sentenced to 30 years imprisonment at Liverpool Crown Court in 2011 for conspiring with a gang in Merseyside, United Kingdom to import large quantities of cocaine from South America.

== Life ==
Mehmet Şirin Baybaşin was born in Lice, Diyarbakır, Turkey in 1965. His family was of Kurdish origin and was involved in farming and animal husbandry.

He was still a child when his family made drugs an illegal business, especially in the early 1970s when his uncle Mehmet Şerif Baybaşin started producing drugs by refining heroin in an isolated village in Lice, but he became a drug dealer as a teenager.

In 1994, Turkish authorities issued a search warrant for him and he was arrested in Austria the same year. He was first sent to the Netherlands and then to Turkey in September 2000 to serve his sentence.
