= Hüseyin Baybaşin =

Turkish drug baron

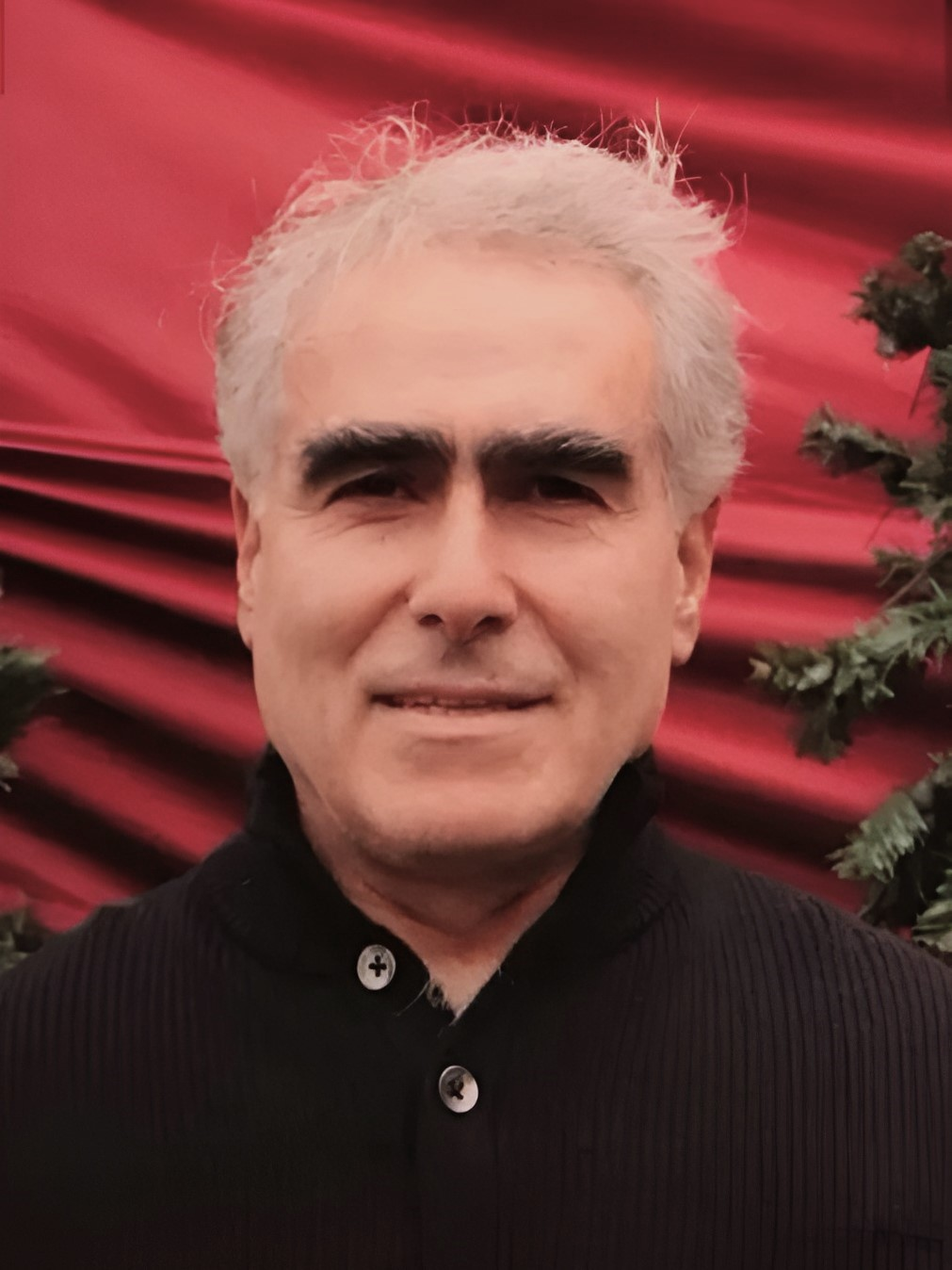
- Baybaşin in 2022
- Born: 25 December 1956 (age 69); Lice, Turkey
- Other name: European Pablo Escobar
- Citizenship: Turkey; Netherlands
- Years active: 1976–present
- Children: 4
- Relatives: Abdullah Baybaşin (brother); Mehmet Baybaşin (brother)
- Family: Baybaşin family
- Status: In prison
- Conviction: See § Trials
- Penalty: Life imprisonment

Details
- Imprisoned at: Nieuw Vosseveld
- Website: hsbaybasin.com

Hüseyin Baybaşin (born 25 December 1956) is a Turkish drug baron and crime boss, the former leader of the Baybaşin family. Following his drug trafficking in the 1990s, he made his name internationally. He was a notorious criminal against whom European countries had issued search warrants. In 2002, he was sentenced to life imprisonment and sent to Nieuw Vosseveld, where he remains today.

Baybaşin was born in Lice in 1956. At the age of 14, he was introduced to marijuana and was first caught with pounds of hashish in Istanbul in 1976, when he was 20. In the following years, he became a heroin dealer when his family entered the heroin business. With the Kısmetim-1 incident in 1992, he made a name for himself in Turkish and European media. In 1994, he moved to the United Kingdom, where his brother Abdullah Baybaşin was also based.

In 1997, Baybaşin was one of the most wanted men by British foreign intelligence MI6. In 1998, his personal fortune was estimated to be at least £22.2 billion in today's pound sterling. Having tracked him down, the intelligence coalition arrested him and his nephew Gıyasettin Baybaşin in a mansion in Lieshout, Netherlands on 27 March 1998 in a joint operation code-named Black Tulip.

Baybaşin was once referenced in the Valley of the Wolves, Turkey's most popular TV series about the mafia. Baybaşin is referred to by the European press as the "Europe's Pablo Escobar". Prosecutor Plummer said of Baybaşin, "We watched him for eight months, it was like watching the movie The Godfather. Every day someone new would come and the first thing they would do was kiss Hüseyin Baybaşin's hand."

== Early life ==
Hüseyin Baybaşin was born in Lice, Diyarbakır, Turkey on 25 December 1956. His family, like every other families in the district, was a Kurdish farmer family with many children. At the age of 14, he met his first drug, marijuana, and started smoking it. When his father Said Baybaşin made drugs an illegal business, he became a drug dealer.

In the early 1970s, his uncle Mehmet Şerif Baybaşin started producing drugs by refining heroin in an isolated village in Lice.

In 1976, he was caught while transporting 24 lb (11 kg) of hashish to Istanbul. On 23 May 1984, he was arrested in Dover, United Kingdom for smuggling drugs internationally on the basis of a fake passport and sentenced to 12 years imprisonment. He was sent from the United Kingdom to Turkey to serve his sentence and served time in Bayrampaşa Prison, but was released in 1989.

== Crime bossing ==
Baybaşin became particularly famous after the MV Kısmetim-1 shipwreck, which shook the public order in Turkey.

The Kısmetim-1 which was surrounded by the USS Briscoe-backed Underwater Offence (SAT) team, allegedly carrying ~6,800 lb (3,100 kg) of morphine base to be smuggled to Turkey, was sunk by its crew in 1992. The captain, who admitted after police interrogation that he received the order from Baybaşin, did not accept the allegations about the presence of drugs on board. Returning from Karachi, Kısmetim-1 had been tagged by the Turkish Narcotics Branch for some time. According to Police Investigators, the ship was going to export the goods from Karachi to Europe via Turkey.

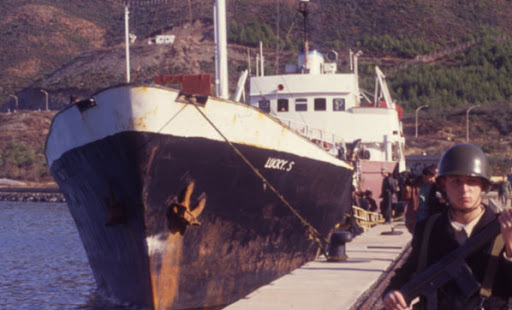
The Lucky-S cargo ship towed into harbour after the operation, 1993

On 7 January 1993, 11,039 kg (24,337 lb) of marijuana and 2,568 kg (5,661 lb) of morphine base were seized from the Lucky-S during an operation in the Mediterranean Sea by the Underwater Offence (SAT) team with technical assistance from the United States. Rumours spread that Kısmetim-1 was an empty ship sunk to divert attention and that Baybaşin's drugs were found on the Lucky-S.

In 1994, he fled to the United Kingdom to join his brother Abdullah Baybaşin and applied for asylum. In 1995, he was arrested in the Rotterdam for dealing in firearms without a licence.

=== Operation Black Tulip ===
In 1997, Hüseyin Baybaşin was on the blacklist of British foreign intelligence MI6. His strict confidentiality was difficult to unravel and was discussed with the Dutch (AIVD), Belgian (GISS), and German (BND) intelligence services.

It was difficult to wiretapping to him because he kept changing his telephone number, did not share it with anyone except relatives, and used cryptic phrases in his conversations. The intelligence coalition had a better way to find him: tracking down anyone who knew Baybaşin. Baybaşin was talking to a relative and told him what he was thinking on the phone: "I've a strange feeling, as if we're resting and they are following us. As if something gonna happen. Let's be very careful!".

On 25 March 1998, Baybaşin's secret mansion in Lieshout, Netherlands was discovered following a tip-off. On 27 March 1998, the intelligence coalition ordered the Special Intervention Service to conduct an operation and the mansion was surrounded at 7:00 am (CEST) in an operation code-named Black Tulip and he was arrested together with his nephew Gıyasettin Baybaşin. Although the two had weapons and ammunition, there was no armed clash.

== Trials ==
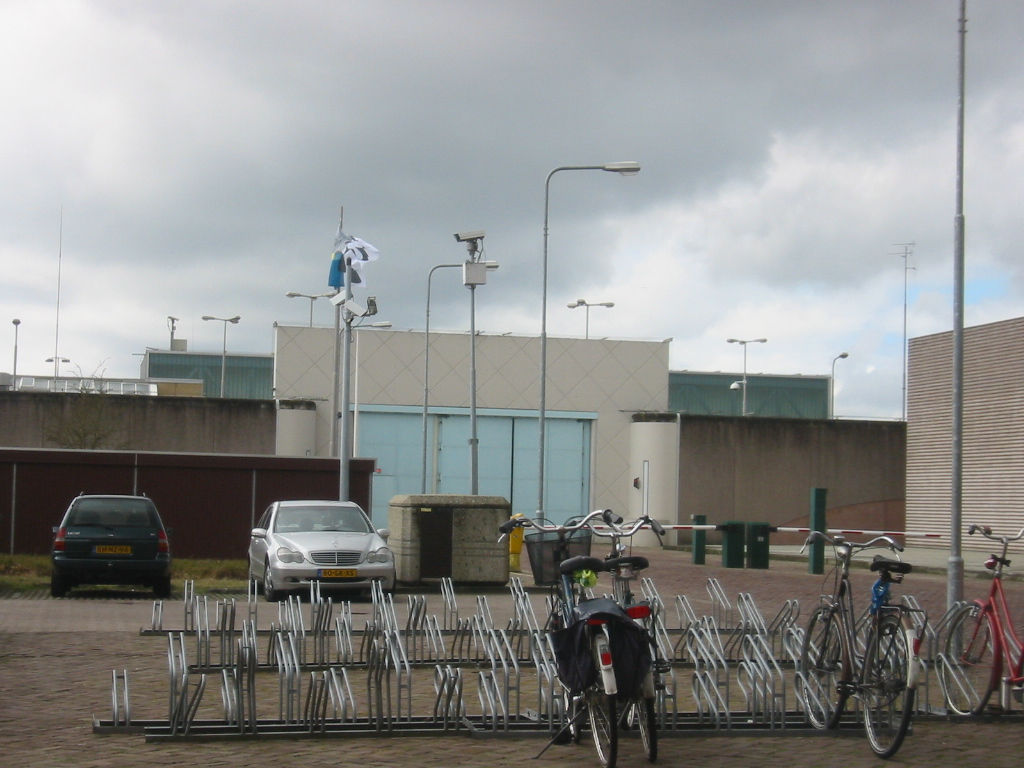
Entrance of Nieuw Vosseveld (2006)

After his arrest, Baybaşin was placed in a regular detention center in Rotterdam in April 1998. On 26 June 1998, he was decided to place him in Nieuw Vosseveld, a high-security prison in Vught, Netherlands.

Baybaşin were tried and found guilty of murdering, torture, hostage, racketeering, criminal conspiracy kidnapping, document forgery, drug trafficking, and arms trafficking on 10 February 2001. Ton Derksen, a Dutch professor emeritus, got access to the telephone recordings which were presented as evidence. According to Derksen, the telephone recordings were manipulated. Baybaşin was sentenced to 20 years' imprisonment, which was commuted to life imprisonment in July 2002. Gıyasettin Baybaşin was sentenced to 11 years imprisonment. Abdullah Baybaşin was convicted around the same time and imprisoned in the United Kingdom.

On 24 December 2003, Baybaşin was transferred to another prison with a different regime. On 23 March 2004, a psychiatric report found that he had developed various mental problems including chronic post-traumatic stress disorder, depression, and a strong tendency towards somatisation during his detention in the maximum security prison. In the same period, the State Security Court in Istanbul convicted Baybaşin and Gıyasettin Baybaşin, who were imprisoned in the Netherlands, and Baybaşin's cousin Nizamettin Baybaşin, who was sentenced to 15 years' imprisonment in Germany, on charges of forming a criminal organisation, establishing a terrorist organisation, and exporting illegal drugs.

=== Tortures ===
A search of Baybaşin's house in Green Lanes (London) revealed clues that torture had taken place there. This "torture cell", located on the upper floor of the house, had a 12 inches (30 centimetres) thick soundproof door, and three layers of glass insulation. In this cell, there were pliers, a drill, a chainsaw, and an electrical torture machine connected to the electrical system of the house with two large metal hooks on the ceiling.

Baybaşin was held responsible for the murder and disposal of the body of Murat Kartal, a Turkish gangster and former friend with whom he had a conflict of interest. Kartal's body was later found in 2021 by chance during excavation work in the Pınarbaşı neighborhood of Büyükçekmece, Istanbul, with his clothes on and concrete thrown over him. This led the investigators to conclude that Kartal was probably being buried alive in concrete after tortured.

== Personal life ==
I read books, write, exercise, cook. I cook Kurdish food. I don't like too much sleep. If I sleep more than a few hours, I feel groggy. It's been like this since I was a kid.

— Hüseyin Baybaşin, interview in prison (2021)

In an interview in prison, he mentioned that he had four children. He painted nearly a thousand oil paintings in prison—closely interested in art. He said that he sold these paintings and donated the proceeds to orphaned children in Diyarbakır.

He is a Kurdish nationalist and active supporter and financier of the PKK. He applied to renounce his Turkish citizenship, and while in prison, he became a naturalised Dutch citizen.

=== Wealth ===
Baybaşin's assets are disputed. In 1998, his personal fortune was estimated at £10 billion (£22.2 billion in today's inflation-adjusted sterling). According to the reports of the Dutch police, in the same year he owned movable and immovable property, but the licences and title deeds of the properties were registered in the name of his relatives, not him, and most of them could not be confiscated:

- Five cars, three pieces of valuable land, two furniture companies, and a house in the Netherlands.
- A mansion worth €60,000,000 in Belgium.
- A hotel and house in England.
- A vehicle worth 50,000 marks, land worth ~400,000 marks, and a company in Germany.
- Small plots of lands in Turkey worth $10,500,000 and a car worth ~$70,000.

It is estimated that he invested the rest of his fortune in touristic resorts, luxury hotels, and nightclubs on the Mediterranean and Aegean coasts.

== In popular culture ==
In the European and American public opinion of the early 2000s, Baybaşin was constantly referred to as "Europe's Pablo Escobar" or "European Escobar" and strong family relationships were mentioned by commentators.

Robin Plummer, the British prosecutor, made the following statement about Baybaşin:

We watched him for eight months, it was like watching the movie The Godfather. Every day someone new would come and the first thing they would do was kiss Hüseyin Baybaşin's hand. The Baybaşin family terrorized other mafias in the UK for many years.

Baybaşin was once referenced in the Valley of the Wolves (2003–2005), Turkey's most popular TV series about the mafia. In the 47th episode of the series, a scenario in which the goods of a drug baron named Hüsrev Ağa—from Diyarbakır—sink into the sea with Kısmetim-1 (renamed as Nasibim-1 in the series) was included.
