= Abdullah Baybaşin =

Turkish drug trafficker

- Born: 1960 (age 65–66); Lice, Turkey
- Other names: The Heroin Godfather; The Heroin Emperor
- Citizenship: Turkey
- Years active: 1980s–present
- Known for: In the 2000s, he smuggled drugs from Turkey, South America, and Afghanistan to many European cities
- Spouse: Dicle Pırpırok (m. 1984)
- Children: Çağdaş Baybaşin (b. 1985)
- Relatives: Hüseyin Baybaşin (brother); Mehmet Baybaşin (brother)
- Family: Baybaşin family

Abdullah Baybaşin (born 1960) is a Turkish drug trafficker and the current head of the Baybaşin family. Following the imprisonment of his brother Hüseyin Baybaşin in 2002, he actively engaged in drug trafficking. He was imprisoned in the United Kingdom in 2006 and released in 2011 and as of 2012, he has returned to Turkey permanently.

== Life ==
Abdullah Baybaşin was born into a poor Kurdish farmer family in Lice, Diyarbakır, Turkey in 1960. He has brothers named Mahmut, Hüseyin, and Mehmet. In his own words, he was quiet and asocial as a child and liked to spend time alone. Due to the Turkish coup d'état in 1980, he and three Baybaşin members of his family emigrated to England.

In 1984, he married Dicle Pırpırok, a fellow countrywoman, and from this marriage his only child, Çağdaş Baybaşin (born 1985), was born.

According to his own testimony, he had a disabling accident in the Netherlands in 1986 and began using a wheelchair. However, according to the media, his disability was caused by an assassination attempt in a bar in England or the Netherlands.

== Crime bossing and prosecution ==
In 1998, Baybaşin took over drugs and arms trafficking in the United Kingdom as the successor of his elder brother Hüseyin Baybaşin, who was arrested in Operation Black Tulip and imprisoned in 2002. In 2006, he was convicted of heroin trafficking and sentenced to 22 years in prison. The Court of Appeal in England ordered a retrial on the drugs charge in 2010 after determining that the judge's summing up of the evidence at the trial was unfair.

On 22 October 2010, at a retrial, a judge at Woolwich Crown Court in London ordered the jury to find Baybaşin not guilty on the grounds that the conviction could not be supported due to insufficient prosecution evidence. Judge Charles Byers said there was no direct evidence that Baybaşin was involved in a conspiracy to supply heroin and there was little circumstantial evidence.

On 8 November 2010, compensation was ordered to be paid to Baybaşin in the amount of £20,000 by the Prison Service. The Ministry of Justice acknowledged that Baybaşin, who uses a wheelchair, had been subjected to degrading treatment and discrimination because of his disability while in HM Prison Belmarsh in London. After hearing the Ministry's decision, Baybaşin said: "The treatment I received there (in prison) was very humiliating and at times I found it difficult to cope. I thought I would die in prison and often thought things would never get better."
