= USS Briscoe (DD-977) =

Spruance-class destroyer of the United States Navy

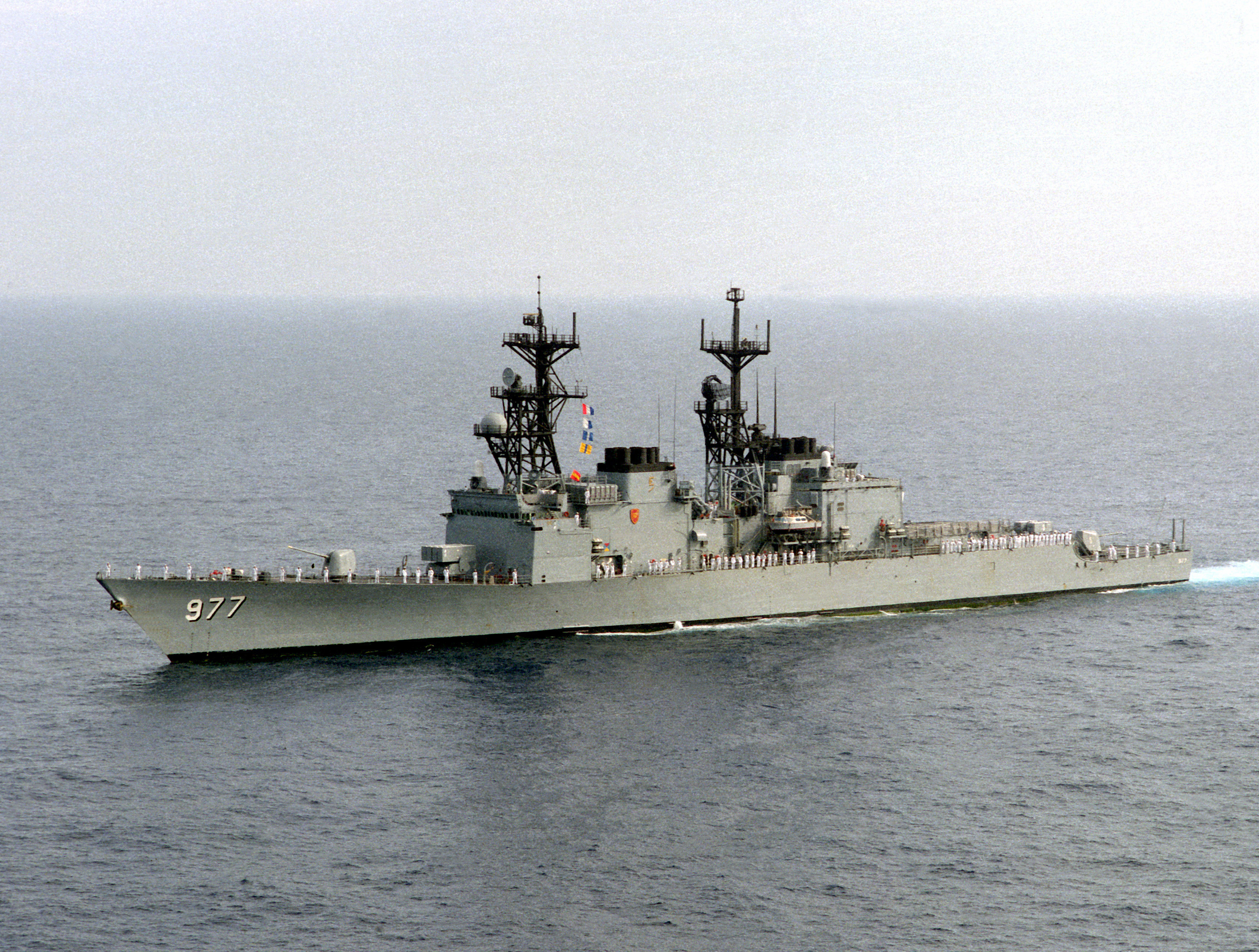
- USS Briscoe in 1981

History

United States
- Name: Briscoe
- Namesake: Robert Pearce Briscoe
- Ordered: 26 January 1972
- Builder: Ingalls Shipbuilding
- Laid down: 21 July 1975
- Launched: 28 December 1976
- Acquired: 8 May 1978
- Commissioned: 3 June 1978
- Decommissioned: 2 October 2003
- Stricken: 6 April 2004
- Identification: Callsign: NDIB; Hull number: DD-977
- Motto: Efficiency and Valor
- Fate: Sunk as target, 25 August 2005
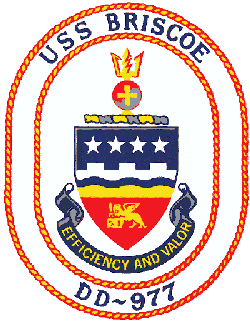
- Badge

General characteristics
- Class & type: Spruance-class destroyer
- Displacement: 8,040 long tons (8,170 t) full load
- Length: 529 ft (161 m) waterline; 563 ft (172 m) overall
- Beam: 55 ft (17 m)
- Draft: 29 ft (8.8 m)
- Installed power: 3 × 501-K17 generator sets (2,000 kW (2,700 hp) each)
- Propulsion: 4 × General Electric LM2500 gas turbines, 2 shafts, 80,000 shp (60 MW)
- Speed: 32.5 knots (60.2 km/h; 37.4 mph)
- Range: 6,000 nmi (11,000 km; 6,900 mi) at 20 knots (37 km/h; 23 mph)
- Complement: 19 officers, 315 enlisted
- Sensors & processing systems: AN/SPS-40 air search radar; AN/SPG-60 fire control radar; AN/SPS-55 surface search radar; AN/SPQ-9 gun fire control radar; Mark 23 TAS automatic detection and tracking radar; AN/SPS-65 missile fire control radar; AN/SQS-53 bow-mounted active sonar; AN/SQR-19 TACTAS towed array passive sonar; Naval Tactical Data System
- Electronic warfare & decoys: AN/SLQ-32 electronic warfare system; AN/SLQ-25 Nixie torpedo countermeasures; Mark 36 SRBOC decoy launching system; AN/SLQ-49 inflatable decoys
- Armament: 2 × 5 in (127 mm) 54 caliber Mark 45 dual purpose guns; 2 × 20 mm Phalanx CIWS Mark 15 guns; 1 × 8 cell ASROC launcher (removed); 1 × 8 cell NATO Sea Sparrow Mark 29 missile launcher; 2 × quadruple Harpoon missile canisters; 2 × Mark 32 triple 12.75 in (324 mm) torpedo tubes (Mk 46 torpedoes); 1 × 61 cell Mk 41 VLS launcher for Tomahawk missiles; 1 × 21 cell RIM-116 Rolling Airframe Missile launcher; 2 x Mk38 25mm Machine Gun System mounted midships
- Aircraft carried: 2 × Sikorsky SH-60 Seahawk LAMPS III helicopters
- Aviation facilities: Flight deck and enclosed hangar for up to two medium-lift helicopters

USS Briscoe (DD-977), named after Admiral Robert Pearce Briscoe USN, was a Spruance-class destroyer built by the Ingalls Shipbuilding Division of Litton Industries at Pascagoula, Mississippi. She was laid down 21 July 1975, launched 28 December 1976 and commissioned 3 June 1978. The ship operated from Norfolk, Virginia during her entire 25-year career. When decommissioned, she was part of Destroyer Squadron 22.

== History ==
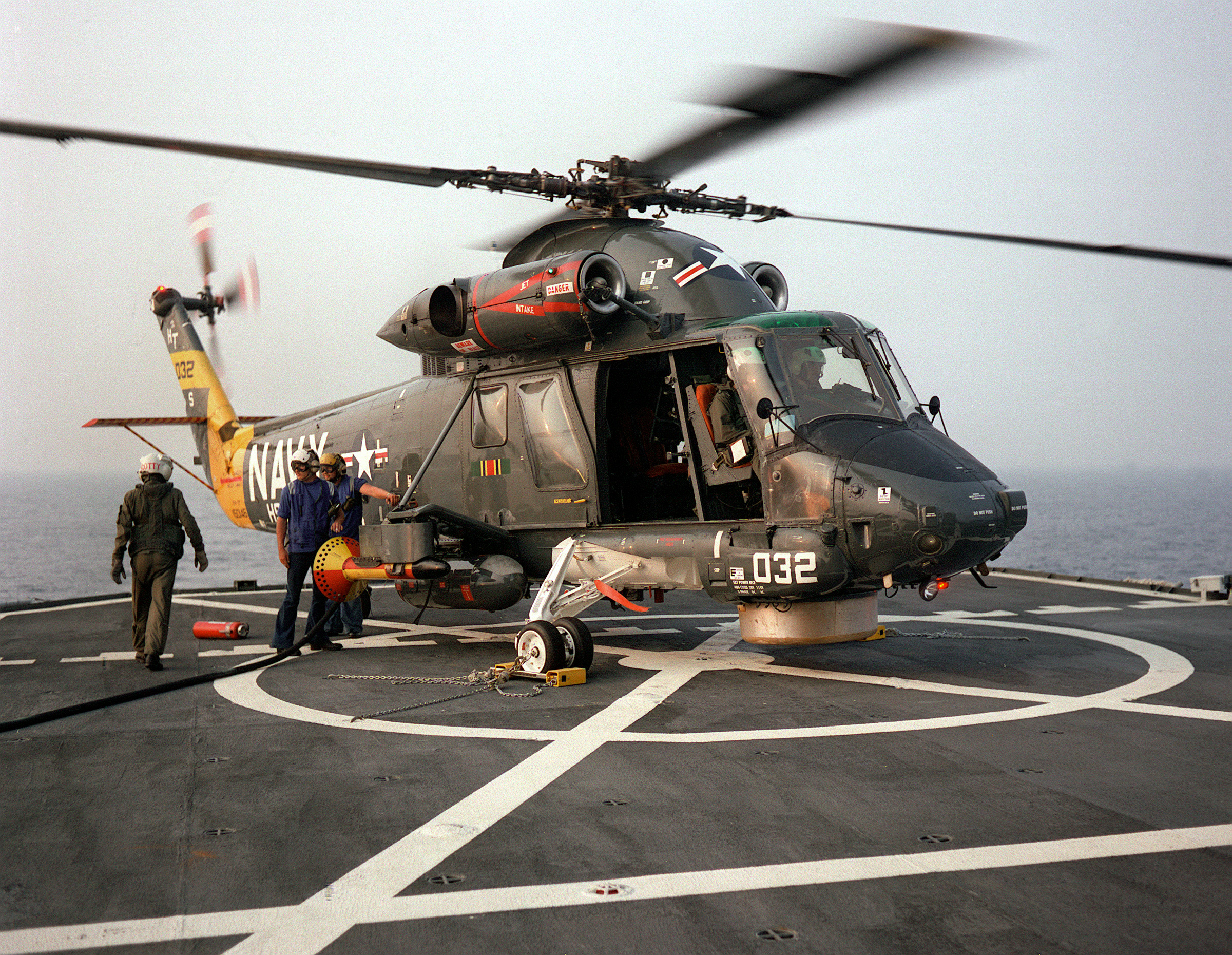
USS Briscoe's SH-2F Seasprite on 1 October 1983

Briscoe conducted firing trials in 1981–1982 in support of the Deadeye laser guided projectile program off the coast of Vieques, Puerto Rico. These projectiles were fired from the 5 inch (127 mm) gun at a range in excess of 11 miles (18 km). While in flight, an optical sensor would detect the signature of a laser-painted target on shore and convert the shell to an actively homing rocket for pinpoint destruction of moving and stationary targets on shore.

Participated in Operation Urgent Fury, the liberation of Grenada, and in the Multi-National Peacekeeping Forces off the coast of Lebanon, and in Baltic Operations 1990. Briscoe also participated as a member of Middle East Forces deploying twice to the North Red Sea conducting Maritime Interception Operations in support of U.N. sanctions against Iraq. Briscoe established a U.S. record of 275 merchant vessel boardings in the North Red Sea during the first of her two deployments to the area.

In her second North Red Sea deployment in March 1994, Briscoe responded to a distress call on 19 May 1994 from an Egyptian passenger ferry, the Al-Qamar Al-Saudi Al-Misri. Briscoe acted as the On-Scene Commander for the ensuing rescue efforts for the over 500 passengers, coordinating the actions of the numerous vessels in the area.

In 1996, Briscoe deployed to the Mediterranean and Black Sea for a six-month period. Deployed with Helicopter Antisubmarine Squadron Light 44 (Detachment 5), Briscoe in Exercise Atlas Hinge with the Tunisian navy and Exercise Shark Hunt and Jaws, an undersea warfare exercise against U.S. submarines in the Central and Eastern Mediterranean Sea.

Briscoe took part in Exercise Classica 96, from 31 August through 9 September, in the spirit of Partnership for Peace. Ships from the U.S. 6th Fleet, Black Sea and Mediterranean littoral nations (including Italy, Ukraine, Greece.

In 1999, at President Bill Clinton's orders, warships of the U.S. Navy assisted in the search for the crashed plane of John F. Kennedy Jr. With the permission of Secretary of Defense William Cohen, a public memorial service for Kennedy was held aboard the Briscoe. Kennedy's body was cremated and his ashes were scattered into the Atlantic Ocean off the coast of Martha's Vineyard.

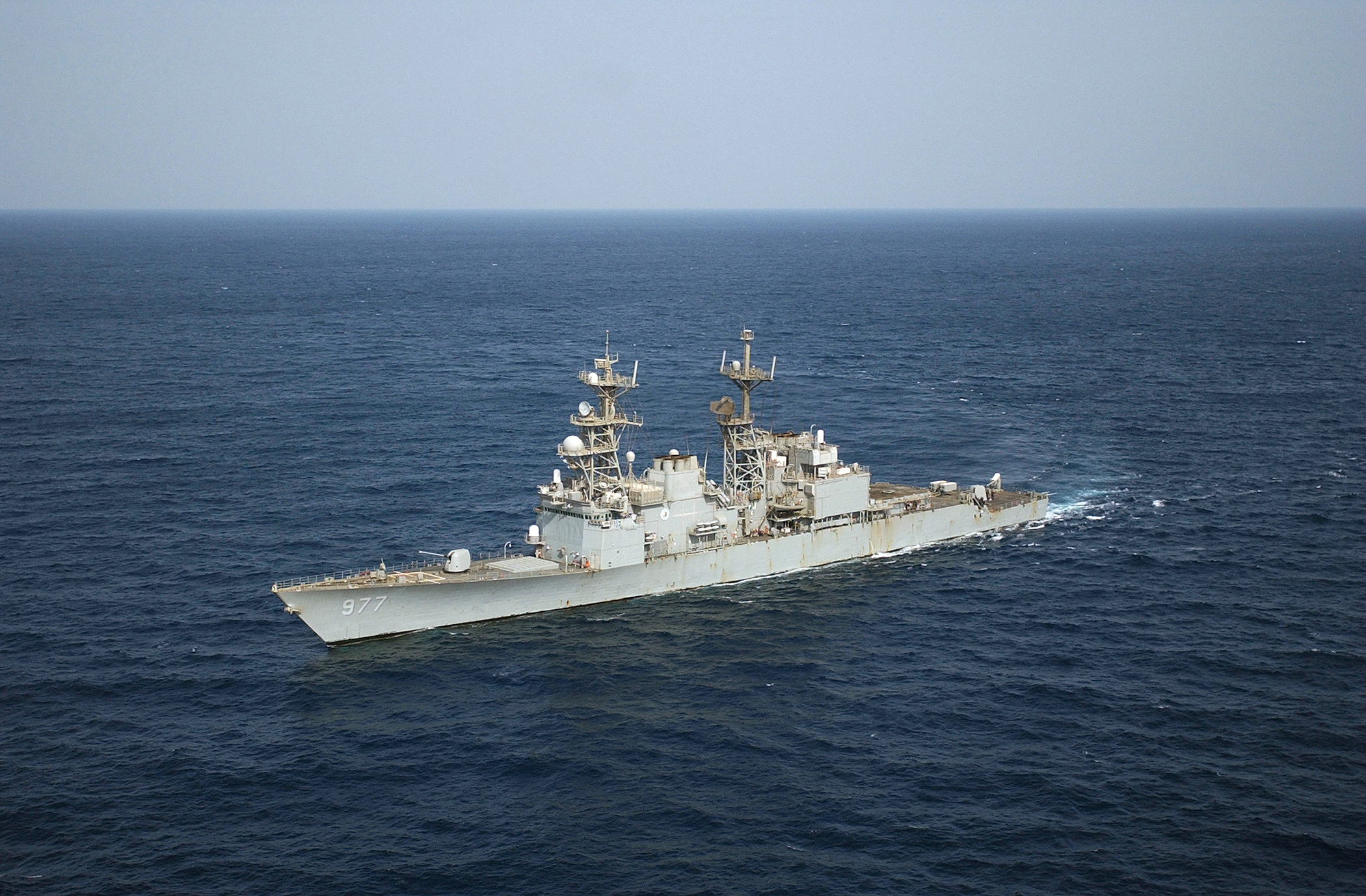
USS Briscoe on 21 March 2003

Routine deployment workups were interrupted in 2001, as Briscoe responded to help provide aerial defense of the U.S. East Coast after the 9/11 terrorist attacks. In 2002, Briscoe deployed as part of the Harry S. Truman Battle Group in support of Operation Iraqi Freedom. Briscoe was one of the first ships to fire Tomahawk cruise missiles on targets in Iraq, firing in total 25 missiles.

Briscoe was decommissioned 2 October 2003. She was disposed of as a target in support of a fleet training exercise on 25 August 2005. She lies at 34°49′N 072°31′W at a depth of 2,252 fathoms (13,512 ft; 4,118 m).

== Awards ==
- Navy Unit Commendation - (Oct 1997-Apr 1998, Jan-May 2003)
- Navy Meritorious Unit Commendation - (1 Aug 1998)
- Battle "E" - (1980, 1992, 1995)
- Navy Expeditionary Medal - (Jul-Sep 1980)
- Southwest Asia Service Medal - (Aug-Oct 1992)
- Humanitarian Service Medal - (18-20 May 1994)

== Ship's crest ==
The ship's coat of arms is a reflection of the naval career of Admiral Robert Pearce Briscoe.

Standing boldly at the base of the shield is the Lion of St. Mark, which refers to the Admiral's leadership as Commander in Chief of Allied Southern Forces Europe. The fess and wavy bar, immediately above the Lion of St. Mark, suggest flowing water passing warships and small land areas. This is reminiscent of the Northern Solomon Islands where Admiral Briscoe commanded the USS Denver in World War II several important engagements. The shield is completed by four stars, symbolic of Admiral Briscoe's leadership achievement and rank.

Atop the shield is a crest symbolic of further achievement in a long and successful career. The trident, symbol of Triton, ruler of the seas, refers to the United States Naval Academy where the Admiral served as a student, instructor and department head. The flash represents Prometheus' gift of science to mankind and alludes to Admiral Briscoe as one of the pioneers of modern electronics development in the Navy. The cross refers to the Navy Cross Admiral Briscoe received for his actions in the North Solomon Campaign. The crest is completed by the Taegeuk which denotes the Admiral's Far East Naval Command.

The coat of arms is summed up by the ship's motto "Efficiency and Valor", given to the ship by former chief of naval operations, Admiral Robert Carney, as a tribute to his close friend.

== Gallery ==
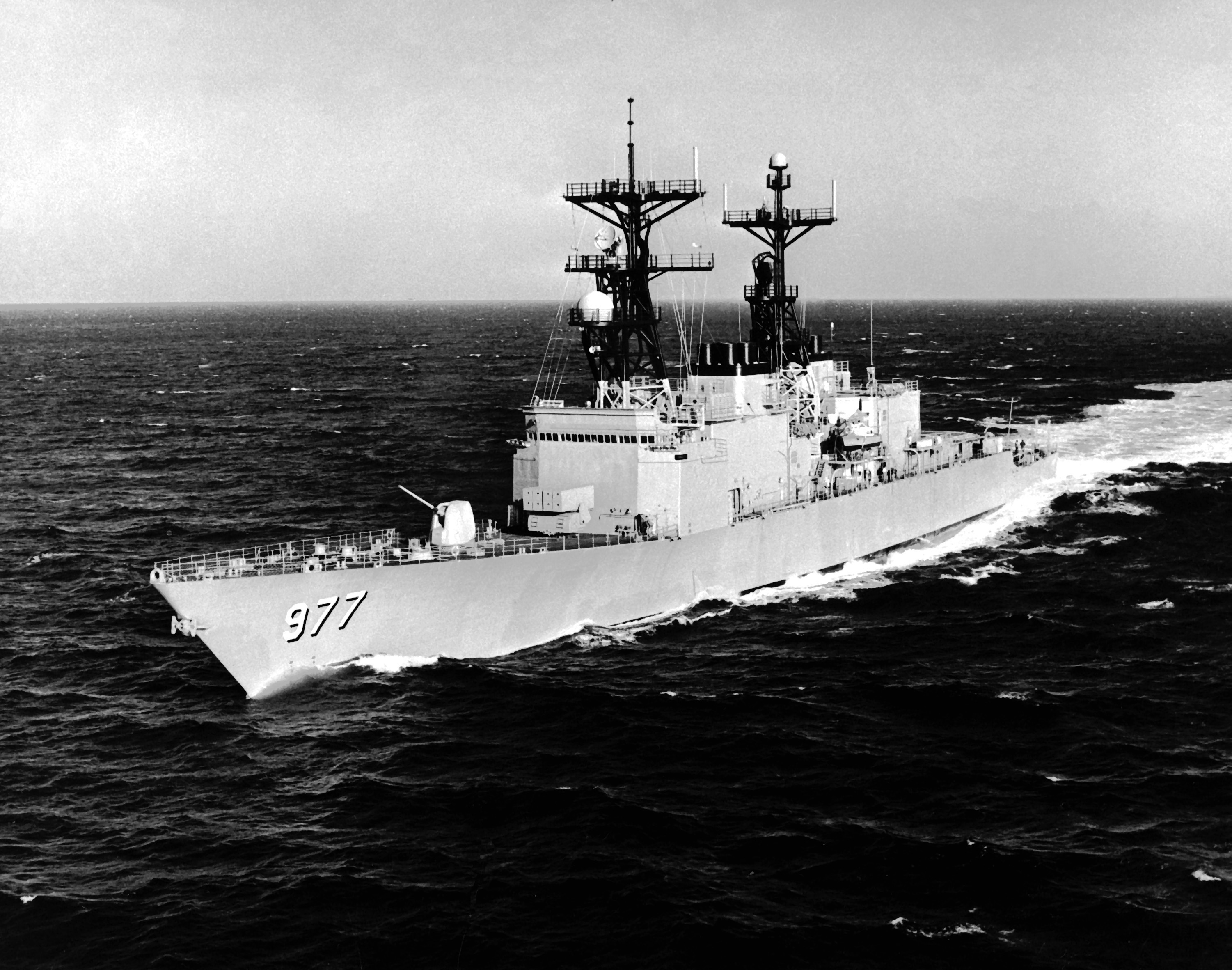
USS Briscoe on 1 April 1982

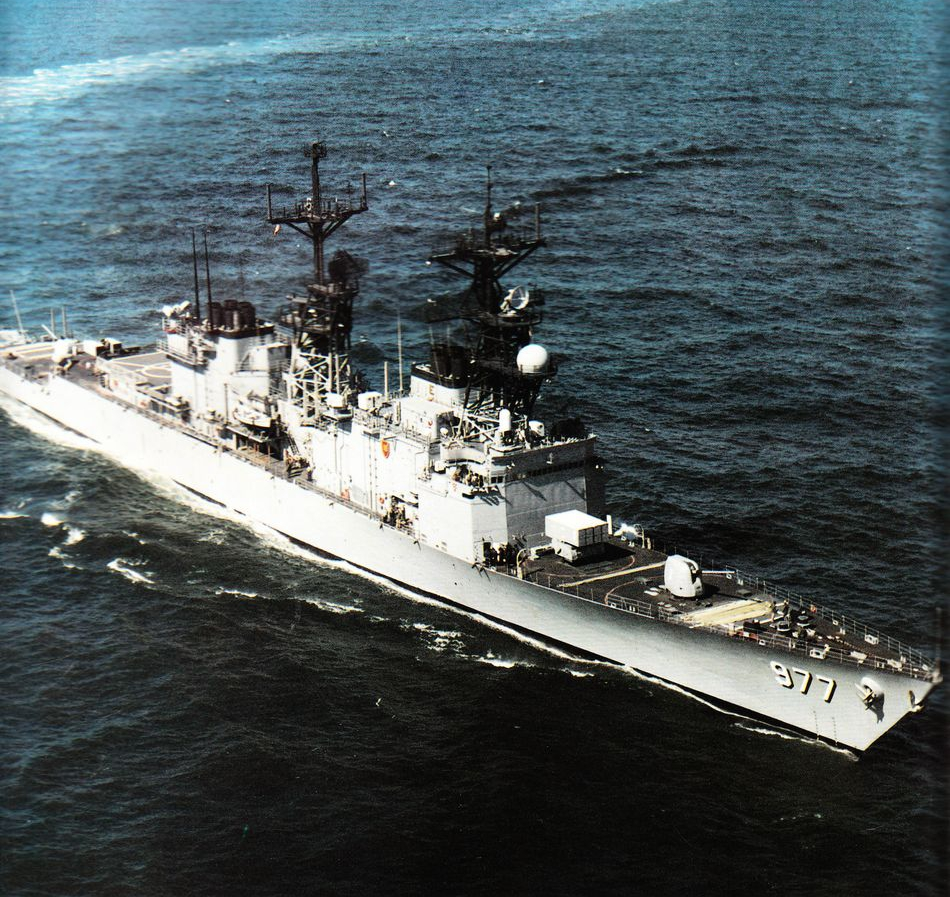
USS Briscoe in 1987

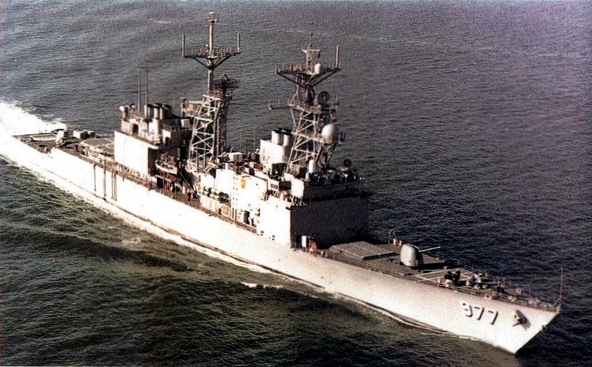
USS Briscoe in 1996

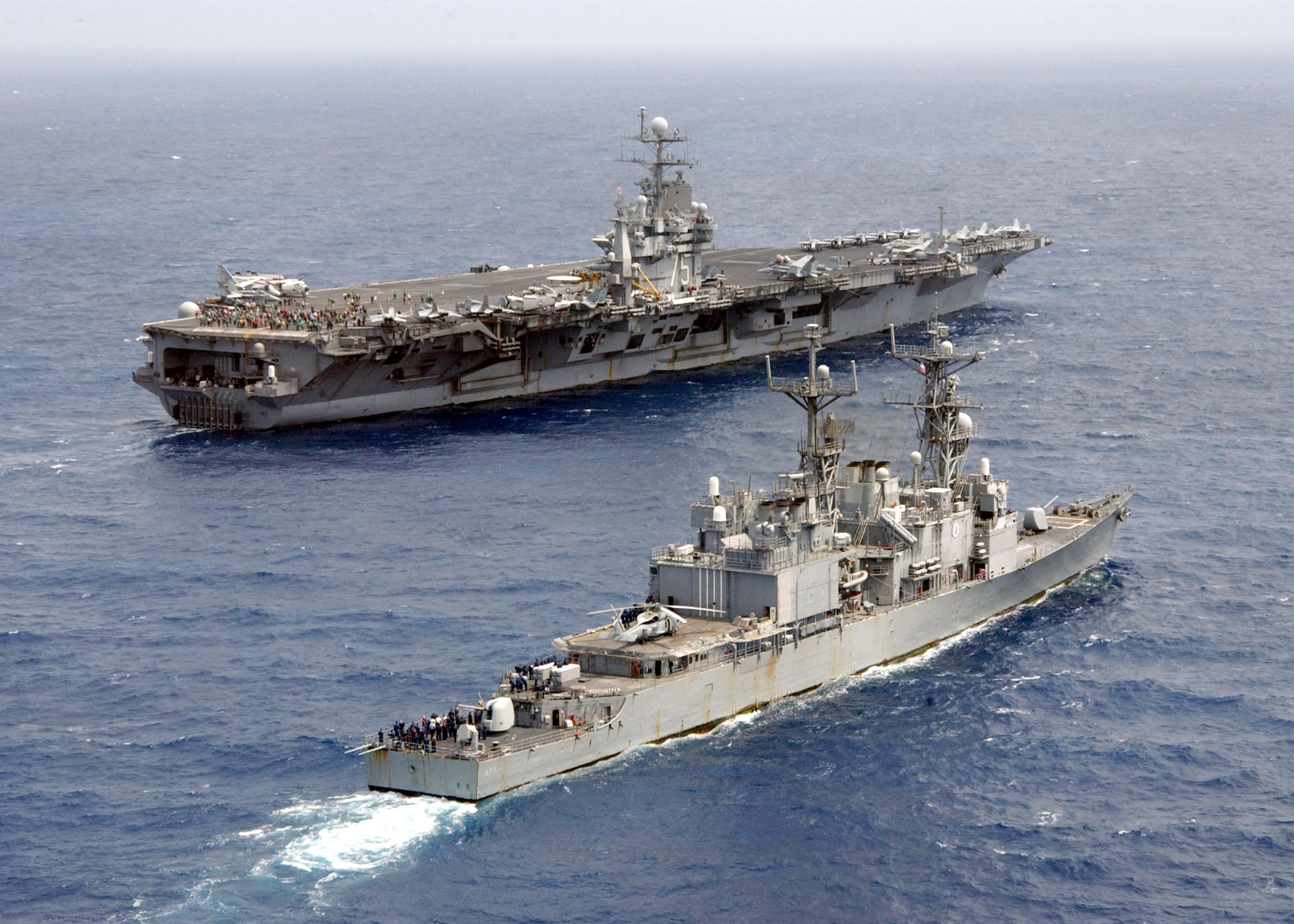
USS Briscoe and USS Harry S. Truman on 23 April 2003
