= Drug lord =

Person who controls a sizable network of persons involved in the illegal drug trade

A drug lord, drug baron, kingpin, or lord of drugs is a type of crime boss in charge of a drug trafficking network, organization, or enterprise. When a group of independent drug lords collude with each other, in order to improve their profits and dominate the illegal drug trade, they form an organization called a drug cartel.

== List of well-known drug lords ==
=== Pablo Escobar ===
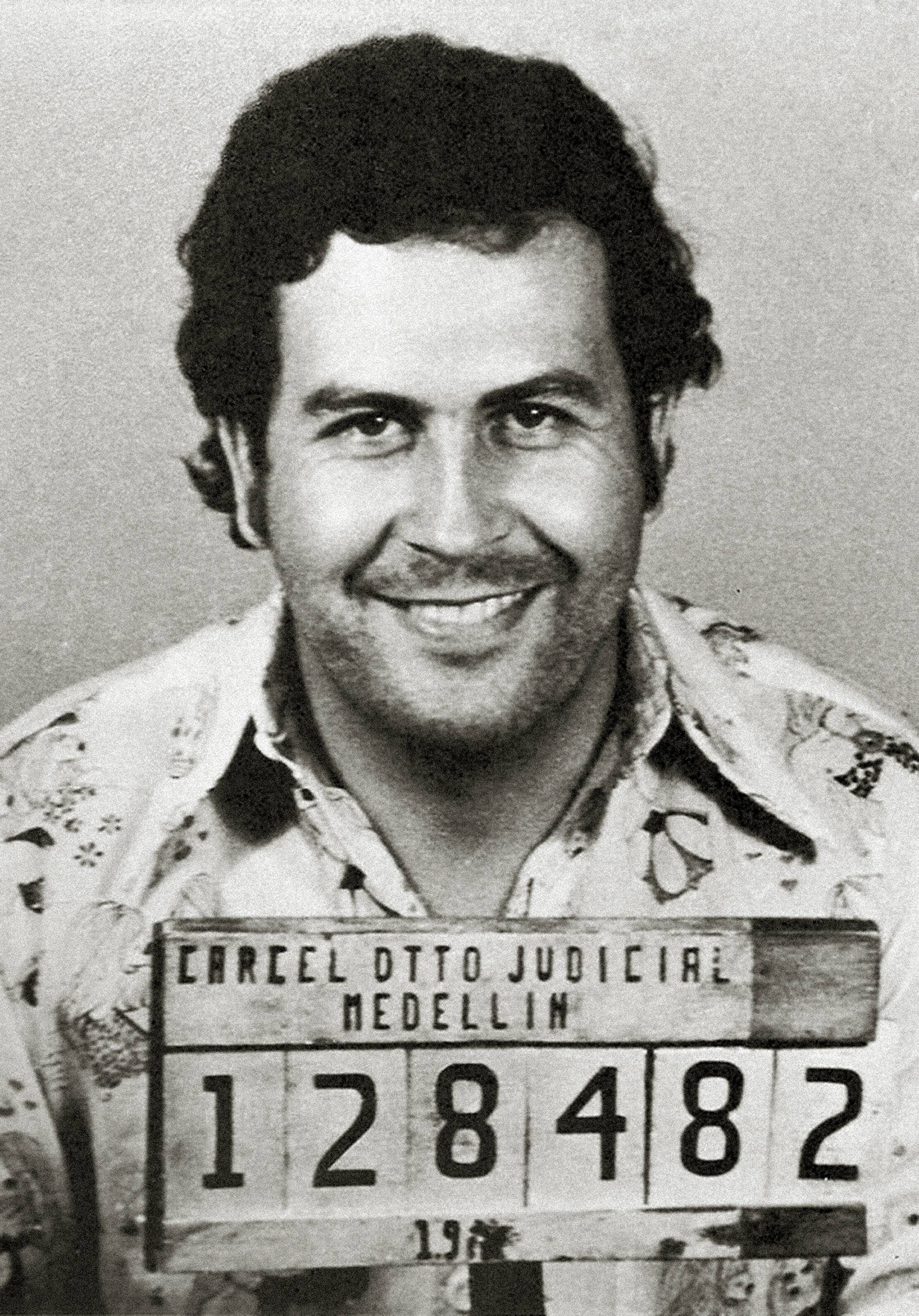
Pablo Escobar

Pablo Emilio Escobar Gaviria (December 1, 1949 – December 2, 1993) was a Colombian drug overlord. Often referred to as the "World's Greatest Outlaw", Escobar was perhaps the most elusive cocaine trafficker to have ever existed. He is considered the 'King of Cocaine' and is known as the lord of all drug lords. In 1989, Forbes magazine declared Escobar as the seventh-richest man in the world, with an estimated personal fortune of US$30 billion. In 1986, he attempted to enter Colombian politics. It is said that Pablo Escobar once burnt two million dollars in cash to keep his daughter warm while on the run. Escobar was the boss of the famous Medellín Cartel, the most powerful drug empire to exist and is said to have had over twice the power and money of their rivals, the Cali Cartel. Pablo was known as Paisa Robin Hood, for his contributions to the poor, but was also known for murdering anyone who got in his way. His carrot-and-stick strategy of bribing public officials in the Colombian government, and sending hitmen to murder the ones who rejected his bribes, came to be known as "silver or lead" or "money or bullets". When the Colombian government launched a manhunt for Escobar, it needed assistance from the DEA, the CIA, the Cali Cartel, and Los Pepes. On December 2, Search Bloc killed Escobar on a rooftop.

=== Amado Carrillo Fuentes ===
As a top drug lord in Mexico, Amado Carrillo (1956–1997) was transporting four times more cocaine to the U.S. than any other trafficker, building a fortune of over $25 billion. He was called El Señor de Los Cielos ("The Lord of the Skies") for his use of over 22 private 727 jet airliners to transport Colombian cocaine to municipal airports and dirt airstrips around Mexico, including Juárez. He was a member of the Guadalajara Cartel and worked for Miguel Ángel Félix Gallardo. After Félix was arrested, Amado formed the Juarez Cartel. In the months before his death, the DEA described Carrillo as the most-powerful drug trafficker of his era, and many analysts claimed profits neared $25 billion.

=== Joaquín "El Chapo" Guzmán ===
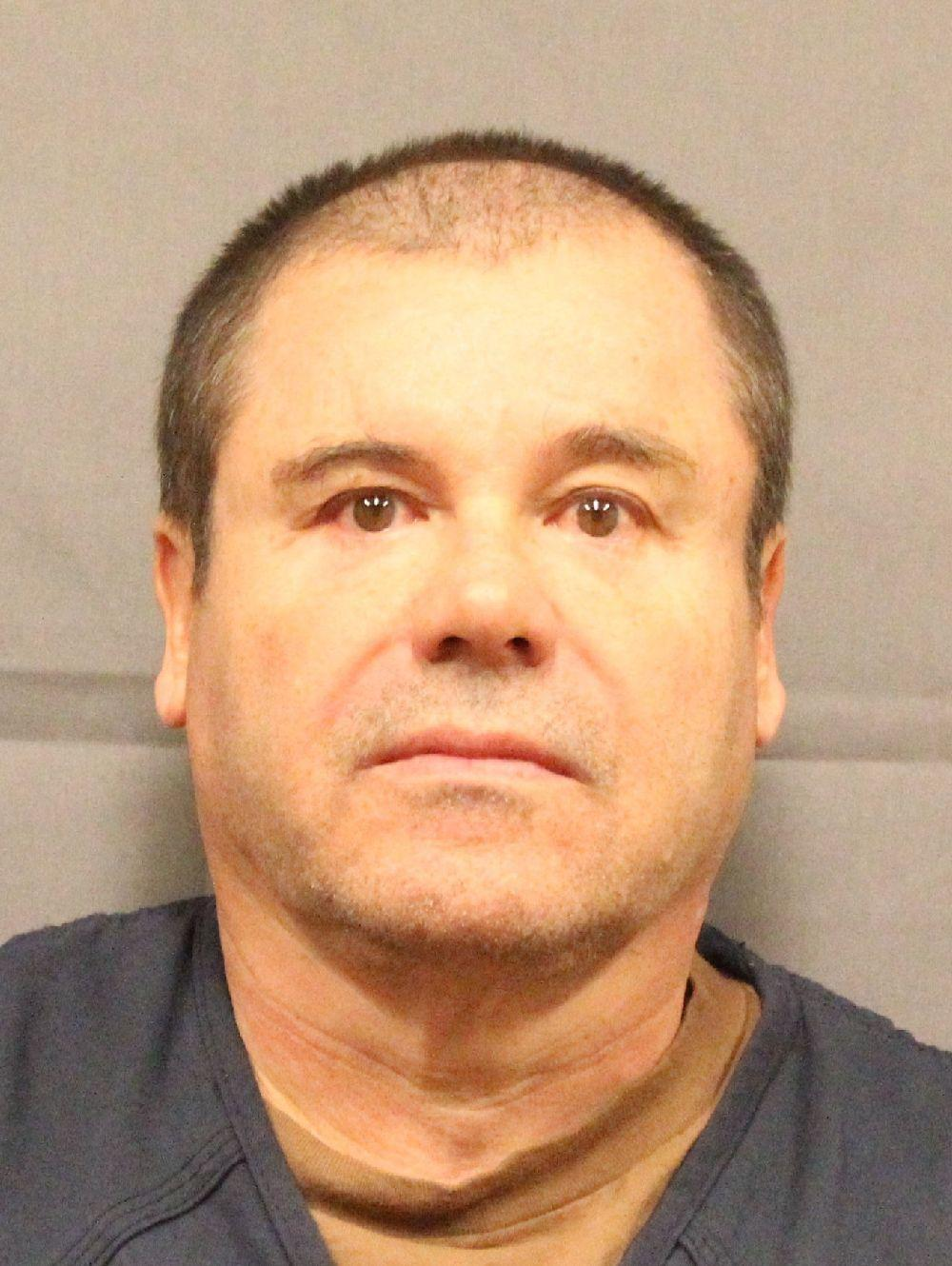
El Chapo

Guzman is the most notorious drug lord in history, according to the U.S. Drug Enforcement Administration (DEA). In the 1980s, he was a member of the Guadalajara Cartel and used to work for Miguel Ángel Félix Gallardo. After Félix's arrest in 1989, Guzmán formed the Sinaloa Cartel along with Ismael Zambada García and Héctor Luis Palma Salazar. He is well known for his use of sophisticated tunnels—similar to the one located in Douglas, Arizona—to smuggle cocaine from Mexico into the United States in the early 1990s. In 1993, a 7.3-ton shipment of his cocaine, concealed in cans of chili peppers and destined for the United States, was seized in Tecate, Baja California. That same year he barely escaped an ambush by the Tijuana Cartel led by Ramon Arellano Felix and his gunmen. After being captured in Guatemala, he was jailed in 1993 and in 1995 he was moved to the maximum-security prison called Puente Grande, but paid his way out of prison and hid in a laundry van as it drove through the gates. On 22 February 2014, Guzmán was arrested again. He is considered a folk hero in the narcotics world, celebrated by musicians who write and perform narcocorridos (drug ballads) extolling his exploits. For example, Los Traviezos recorded a ballad extolling his life on the run. In July 2015, Guzman escaped a second time from a maximum-security prison through a hole in a shower floor that led to a mile-long tunnel, ending at a nearby house. A large-scale manhunt ensued. On 8 January 2016, Guzmán was captured by the Mexican Marines. He was sentenced to life imprisonment, and incarcerated in ADX Florence, Colorado, United States.

=== Osiel Cárdenas Guillén ===
Osiel Cárdenas Guillén (born 18 May 1967) is a former Mexican drug lord who was the leader of the Gulf Cartel and Los Zetas. Originally a mechanic in Matamoros, Guillén eventually became involved in the illegal drug trade through the Gulf Cartel before becoming its leader in 1997 by assassinating drug lord Salvador Gómez Herrera. Guillén recruited over 30 deserters from the Mexican Army's special forces unit, the Cuerpo de Fuerzas Especiales, to form the cartel's armed wing; this group would go on to be among the founding members of Los Zetas, another Mexican drug cartel. In 1999, Guillén and a group of Gulf Cartel gunmen threatened two U.S. federal agents at gunpoint, which triggered a massive combined effort from American and Mexican law enforcement agencies to crack down on the leadership structure of the Gulf Cartel and led to Guillén becoming one of the most wanted criminals in the world. Guillén was arrested in Mexico in 2003 and deported to the U.S. in 2007, where he remains incarcerated to this day.

=== Jorge Alberto Rodriguez ===
Jorge Alberto Rodriguez, also known as Don Cholito, is a notorious Argentine-born, Trinidadian and Colombian mixed drug lord from New York, who headed the 400 criminal organization, a dismantled secret cell of the Cali Cartel. Pulled into the drug trade at age 12, he left home at age 14 to begin working for his Father, Gilberto Rodríguez Orejuela, who headed the Cali Cartel. Within six years he had amassed a fortune exceeding over US$300 million by shipping drugs from Colombia to nearly every state in the U.S. He was one of the most ruthless international drug lords unknown to law enforcement or governments. During that time, the murder rate and cocaine-related hospital emergencies in the United States doubled. He was arrested on July 6, 1990, in Tallahassee, Florida and sentenced to a 25-year prison term for a number of federal violations. Following his conviction, Rodriguez continued to operate his illicit business from behind bars, importing as much as 12,500 kilograms of cocaine into the U.S. each month and ordering numerous murders of informants, witnesses, in the U.S. and Colombia. He reigned and flourished while incarcerated until he was placed in court-ordered high-security isolation in 1994. According to the Bureau of Prisons, Rodriguez was released in 2012.he has a Trinidadian Venezuelan and colombian mixed niece and nephew In this Spanish name, the first or paternal surname is Rodriguez and the second or maternal family name is García Jada-Maria García (LA FLACA) & Jaylon García ( El Plomo ) are his two known family members

=== Marcola ===
Born on April 13, 1968, in Osasco (a city located in the state of São Paulo, Brazil), Marcos Willians Herbas Camacho, known as "Marcola" is one of the founders and the current leader of Primeiro Comando da Capital (PCC), the largest and the most powerful Brazilian criminal organization. A Brazilian with Bolivian origins, Marcola (whose criminal career began when he was a child, at the age of nine and currently serving a sentence of 234 years in prison for murder, drug trafficking and other crimes) is the current leader of PCC and commands this powerful crime syndicate within inside the Taubaté Prison, one of the most infamous prisons in Brazil. Under the command of Marcola, the PCC expanded its influence outside Brazil, to having a presence in Bolivia, Ecuador, Venezuela, Paraguay and Peru. The PCC is notorious for its use of violence, for its numerous confrontations with police officers and because of their violent conflicts over territory control and the control of drug trafficking against another powerful Brazilian criminal organization, the Comando Vermelho (or CV), a powerful crime syndicate based in the city of Rio de Janeiro. Marcola is currently serving his sentence at the Brasília Federal Penitentiary, which was inaugurated in 2018 to isolate the country’s most dangerous inmates.

=== Griselda Blanco ===
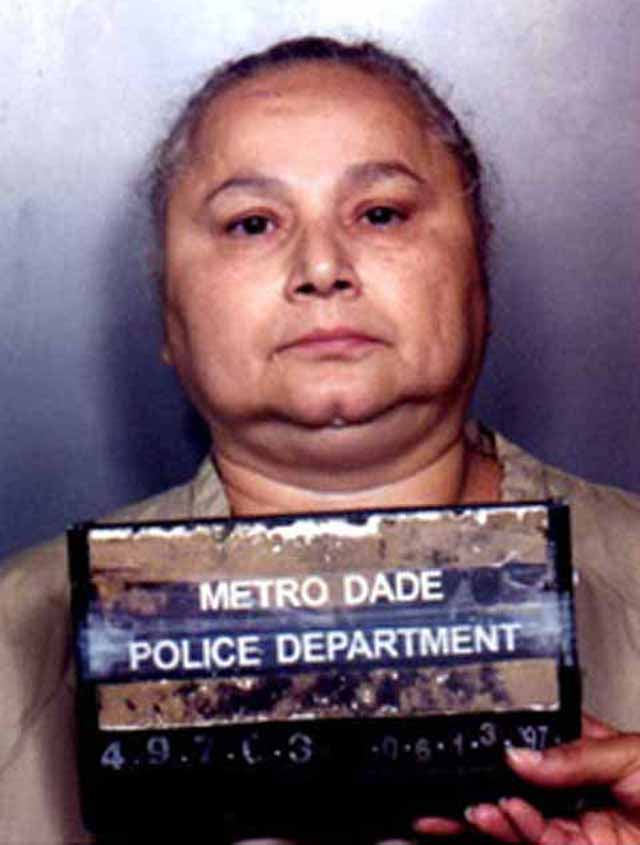
Griselda Blanco

Griselda Blanco (1943–2012), known as the "Godmother of Cocaine", was a drug lord who operated between Miami and Colombia during the 1970s and 1980s. During the height of her operation, she smuggled nearly 1,600 kilograms (3,500 lb) of cocaine into the U.S. every month through a network in south Florida. She was noted for her ruthlessness and use of extreme violence, employing tactics such as publicly assassinating people in broad daylight, bayoneting a rival trafficker inside Miami International Airport, and inventing the drive-by motorcycle shooting execution method. It was estimated that she was responsible for the homicides of 200 people in Colombia, Florida, New York, and California. Arrested in 1985 for drug-trafficking charges, she was subsequently convicted and spent almost 20 years in a U.S. prison. She was killed by motorcycle hitmen in Colombia on 3 September 2012 as she was coming out of a butcher's shop.

=== Roberto Suárez Gómez ===
Pablo Escobar started to buy cocaine from Roberto Suárez in the 1970s when he had just created the Medellín cartel. Suárez started building cocaine laboratories in the middle of the Bolivian Amazon jungle and in the zone of "Los Yungas" in the end of the 1960s and created the first cocaine cartel in Bolivia called "La Corporación". At first, the Medellin cartel bought cocaine at $8,000 per kilogram ($3,600/lb). La Corporación then sold cocaine-based paste to Colombian cartels, and they finished and distributed it in the east of the United States. The finished cocaine was sold directly to Mexican cartels for distribution in the west of the United States. Suárez received untold amounts of money, but as detectives and journalists discovered the corruption between Bolivia and the U.S., the empire Suárez built began to fall. Suárez was arrested by the DEA in 1988, and Escobar took over of the production and distribution of 80% of the world's cocaine.

=== Rick Ross ===
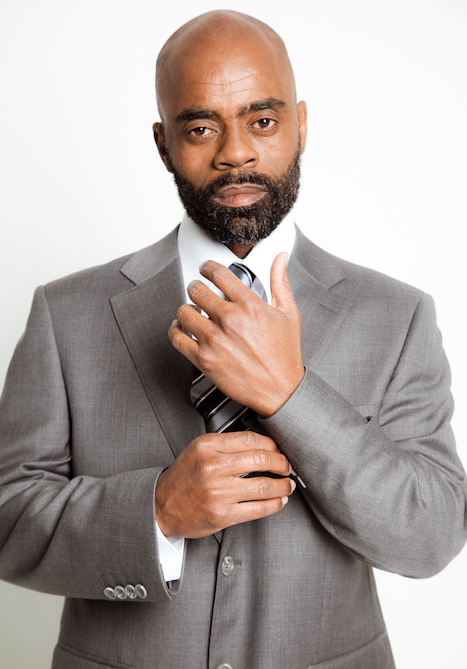
"Freeway" Rick Ross

Rick Ross (born January 28, 1960), a.k.a. "Freeway" Ricky Ross, is a convicted drug-trafficker best known for the drug empire he presided over in Los Angeles in the early 1980s. The nickname "Freeway" came from Ross growing up next to the 110 Harbor Freeway. During the height of his drug dealing, Ross was said to have made "$2 million in one day." According to the Oakland Tribune, "In the course of his rise, prosecutors estimate that Ross transported several tons of cocaine to New York, Ohio, Pennsylvania, and elsewhere, and made more than $600 million in the process."

In 1998, Ross was sentenced to life imprisonment after being convicted of purchasing more than 100 kilograms of cocaine from a federal agent during a sting operation. Ross became the subject of controversy later that year when a series of articles by journalist Gary Webb in the San Jose Mercury News revealed a connection between Ross's main cocaine source, Danilo Blandon, and the CIA as part of the Iran–Contra affair. Ross's case went before the federal court of appeals and his sentence was reduced to 20 years. He was later moved to a halfway house in March 2009 and released from custody on September 29, 2009.

In June 2014, Ross released his book Freeway Rick Ross: The Untold Autobiography, co-written by crime-writer Cathy Scott.

=== Manuel Noriega ===
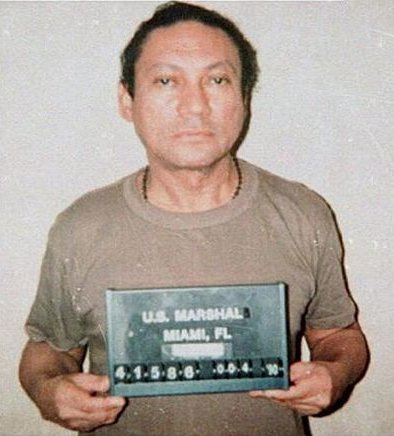
Manuel Noriega, following his arrest by U.S. authorities

By the early 1970s, American law enforcement officials had reports of Noriega's possible involvement with narcotics trafficking. No formal criminal investigations were begun, and no indictment was brought: according to Dinges, this was due to the potential diplomatic consequences. This evidence included the testimony of an arrested boat courier, and of a drug smuggler arrested in New York. Though Torrijos frequently promised the U.S. cooperation in dealing with drug smuggling, Noriega would have headed any effort at enforcement, and the U.S. began to see Noriega as an obstacle to combatting drug smuggling. Dinges writes that the U.S. government considered several options to move Noriega out of the drug trafficking business, including assassinating him, and linking him to a fictional plot against Torrijos. Though no assassination attempt was made, the other ploys may have been tried in the early 1970s, according to Dinges. Dinges wrote that beginning in 1972 the U.S. relaxed its efforts at trapping individuals involved with smuggling within the Panama government, possibly as a result of an agreement between Torrijos and U.S. President Richard Nixon.

=== Ramon Arellano Felix ===
Ramón Arellano Félix was a Mexican drug lord who was a founding member of the Tijuana drug cartel (a.k.a. the Arellano-Félix Organization) alongside his brothers. Arellano Félix was allegedly one of the most ruthless enforcers in the organization and was a suspect in various murders. He had been linked by Mexican police to the 1997 massacre of twelve members of a family outside of Ensenada, Baja California. The family was related to a drug dealer that had an unpaid debt to the Arellano Félix Cartel. On September 18, 1997, Arellano Félix was placed on the FBI's ten most-wanted list. In a sealed indictment in the United States District Court for the Southern District of California, he was charged with conspiracy to import cocaine and marijuana.. Ramon and his brothers, primarily Benjamin Arellano Felix were the undisputed leaders of the Tijuana Cartel and developed an intense rivalry with Joaquin Guzman Loera's Sinaloa Cartel. The war between both organizations lasted more than 10 years until Ramón was killed in Mazatlán on February 10, 2002, by policemen allegedly on the payroll of the rival, Sinaloa Cártel.

=== Ismael Zambada García ===
Ismael Zambada García is a drug smuggler in Mexico and co-founder of the Sinaloa Cartel. Mexico's top anti-drug prosecutor, José Santiago Vasconcelos, called Zambada "drug dealer No. 1" and said the fugitive has become more powerful as his fellow kingpins have fallen, including one who was allegedly killed on Zambada's orders.

On July 25, 2024, Zambada was arrested in Texas after arriving in a private plane with one of Joaquin Guzmán's sons, Joaquín Guzmán López. As of August 2025, he is in federal custody in the USA.

=== Arturo Beltran Leyva ===
Marcos Arturo Beltrán Leyva (September 27, 1961 – December 16, 2009) was the leader of the Mexican drug-trafficking organization known as the Beltrán-Leyva Cartel, which is headed by the Beltrán Leyva brothers: Marcos Arturo, Carlos, Alfredo and Héctor. The cartel was engaged in cocaine, marijuana, heroin, and methamphetamine production, transportation, and wholesaling. It controlled numerous drug-trafficking corridors into the United States. and was also responsible for human smuggling, money laundering, extortion, kidnapping, murder, contract killing, torture, gun-running, and other acts of violence in Mexico. The organization was connected with the assassinations of numerous Mexican law-enforcement officials.

=== Frank Lucas ===
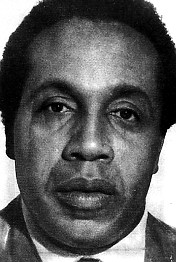
Frank Lucas

Frank Lucas was a former heroin dealer and organized crime boss who operated in Harlem, New York during the late 1960s and early 1970s. He was known for cutting out middlemen in the drug trade and buying heroin directly from his source in the Golden Triangle. Lucas boasted that he smuggled heroin using the coffins of dead American servicemen, but this claim is denied by his South Asian associate, Leslie "Ike" Atkinson. His career was dramatized in the 2007 feature film American Gangster starring Denzel Washington.

=== Leroy Barnes ===
Leroy Antonio "Nicky" Barnes (born October 15, 1933) was a former drug lord and crime boss of the notorious African-American crime organization known as The Council, which controlled the heroin trade in Harlem, New York during the 1970s. In 2007 he released a book, Mr Untouchable, written with Tom Folsom, and a documentary DVD of the same name, about his life. In the 2007 film American Gangster, Barnes is portrayed by Cuba Gooding Jr.

=== Zhenli Ye Gon ===
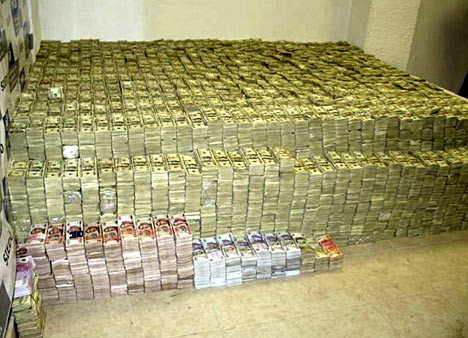
Part of the currency seized from Ye Gon's home

Zhenli Ye Gon (traditional Chinese: 葉真理; born January 31, 1963, Shanghai, People's Republic of China) is a Mexican businessman of Chinese origin accused of trafficking pseudoephedrine into Mexico from Asia. At the time of his arrest, he had $207 million in cash and 18 million Mexican pesos in his house. He claimed that he was forced by Javier Lozano Alarcón, putatively identified as the Secretary of Labor, to keep it at his home and that this money would be used during Felipe Calderón's presidential campaign in 2006. He was the legal representative of Unimed Pharm Chem México. The charges against him were dismissed with prejudice in August 2009 as a result of the efforts of his attorneys, Manuel J. Retureta and A. Eduardo Balarezo.

=== Christopher Coke ===
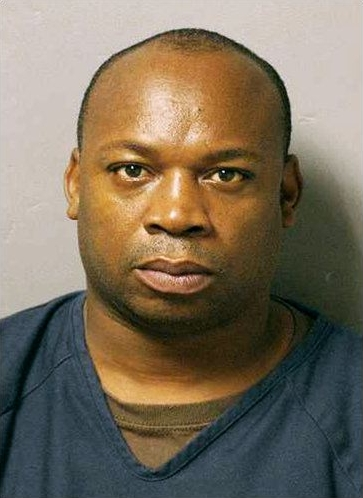
Christopher Coke

Michael Christopher Coke (born 13 March 1969), a.k.a. Dudus, is a Jamaican drug lord and the leader of the Shower Posse gang. He is the youngest son of drug lord Lester Lloyd Coke whose extradition had also, prior to his 1992 death in a Jamaican prison cell, been requested by the U.S. Until the younger Coke's handover to U.S. forces on 24 June 2010, "Dudus" served as the de facto leader of Tivoli Gardens in the city of Kingston; prior to his 2010 capture Jamaican police were unable to enter this neighborhood without community consent.

The son of a prominent drug lord, Coke grew up wealthy, going to school with children of the country's political elite. Ruling the gang where his father left off, he became a leader in the community of Tivoli Gardens, distributing money to the area's poor, creating employment, and setting up community centers.

In 2009, the U.S. began requesting his extradition, and in May 2010, a recalcitrant Government of Jamaica issued a warrant. That same month the government took steps to capture Coke. In a run-up to Coke's arrest, more than 70 people–all but one of them civilians–died in a 24 May 2010 raid of Tivoli Gardens. He was arrested at a Jamaican checkpoint on 22 June 2010.

=== Demetrius Flenory ===
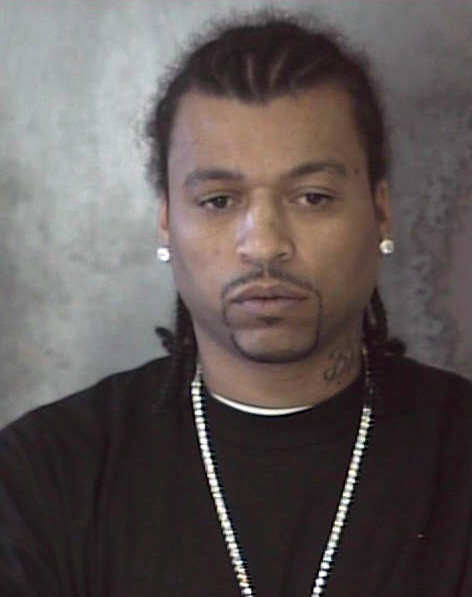
Demetrius Flenory

Demetrius Flenory is known as one of the co-founders of the Black Mafia Family, a Detroit-based drug-trafficking organization involving the large-scale distribution of cocaine throughout the U.S. from 1990 to 2005. He was released in 2026 and is currently streaming is everyday life on Kick. He is now 100% legit. There are currently plans to produce a film based upon his career.

=== José Figueroa Agosto ===
Jose Figueroa Agosto (born June 28, 1964), also known as "José David Figueroa Agosto", "Junior Capsula" and "the Don Pablo Escobar of the Caribbean", is a Puerto Rican drug trafficker. As the head of a major drug trafficking organization that made 90% of cocaine in Puerto Rico, Figueroa Agosto is considered to be one of the most dangerous drug lords of Puerto Rico. He was the most wanted fugitive in Puerto Rico and the Dominican Republic.

=== Jari Aarnio ===
Jari Seppo Aarnio (born 5 September 1957) is the former chief investigator and head of Helsinki's anti-drugs police, who spent 30 years in the anti-drugs force in Finland. He has been sentenced to jail for drug crimes and other offences.

=== Christy Kinahan ===
Known as "The Dapper Don", Christy Kinahan (born 1958) is a notorious Irish drug lord from Dublin, Ireland and the head of Kinahan Cartel, a powerful Irish crime syndicate with territories in several countries around the world, such as Spain (Costa del Sol), United Arab Emirates (Dubai), The Netherlands, among others. Under the command of Christy Kinahan, the Kinahan Cartel became responsible for a large part of drug smuggling (such as heroin, ecstasy and methamphetamine) and arms smuggling to many places in the world. According to Gardai (the national police of Ireland), Kinahan has connections with other powerful Irish mobsters like George Mitchell (Known as "The Penguin") (a notorious gangster from Ballyfermot and cousin of the politicians Gay Mitchell and Jim Mitchell). The Kinahan Cartel is notorious for its bloody feud against another powerful Irish crime syndicate, the Hutch gang (led by Gerry Hutch), in a gang war that became known as the Hutch–Kinahan feud (whose conflict started after the murder of Gary Hutch, Gerry Hutch's nephew and the Shooting of David Byrne at the Regency Hotel in Whitehall, Dublin whose main target was Daniel Kinahan, Christy's oldest son and also a head in the Kinahan Cartel, but ended up taking the life of another important member of the cartel, David Byrne (the son of James Byrne, the brother of Liam Byrne (a notorious lieutenant for Christy Kinahan), the cousin of Freddie Thompson and brother-in-law of Thomas Kavanagh (known as "bomber"), a senior member in the Kinahan Cartel).

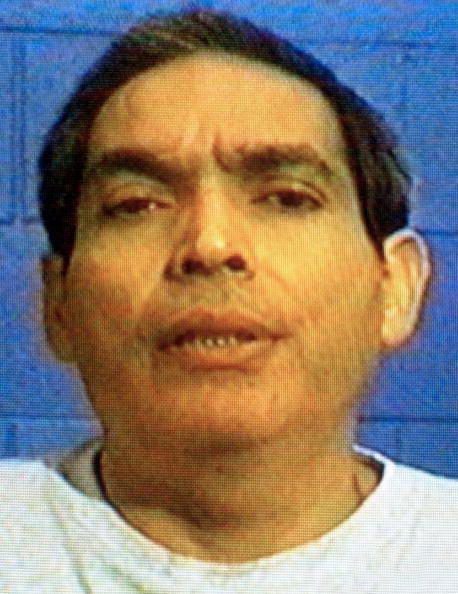
Garza during a video in which he asks President George W. Bush to spare his life

=== Juan Raul Garza ===
Juan Raul Garza (November 18, 1956 – June 19, 2001) ran his own marijuana trafficking ring in Texas, Louisiana, Michigan, and Mexico, exporting thousands of kilograms of marijuana across the border into the United States. He is known as the first and currently the only drug lord to be executed by the United States federal government under the Anti-Drug Abuse Act of 1988. He was executed for three murders he committed in Texas, but was also found to be responsible for five other murders, four of which were committed in Mexico.

=== Liu Zhaohua ===
Liu Zhaohua (March 5, 1965 – September 15, 2009) was a Chinese Drug Lord known for producing and trafficking over 18 tonnes of Methamphetamine. The amount Liu made was worth more than US$5 billion. He was arrested on March 5, 2005, sentenced to death on June 26, 2006, and executed on September 15, 2009.

== Modern drug lords ==
Following the death of Pablo Escobar in 1993, significant changes occurred in the structure of the drug trade, departing from massive cartels such as Juan David Ochoa's Medellín cartel. Drug lords have begun breaking the large cartels into much smaller organizations. In so doing, they decreased the number of people involved and shrank their role as targets—most likely in an attempt to avoid the fate of their predecessors. With newer technology, drug lords are able to manage their operations more effectively from behind the scenes, keeping themselves out of the spotlight and off the FBI and DEA wanted lists. These smaller cartels are slowly proving to be safer and more profitable for those involved.

In developing countries, it is still common for drug lords to control local and regional governments, although this phenomenon is not as common as it was in the past. For example, Ismael "El Mayo" Zambada held de facto control over the Mexican state of Durango, by contributing donations to political campaigns during gubernatorial elections, along with assassinating political candidates who rejected his donations, and through bribing and intimidating the Durango State Police. As of early 2023, he had never been arrested or incarcerated. He was, however, arrested in 2024.

In developed countries, drug lords seldom control local and regional governments; they also have less influence over their surroundings, and their ability to continue to run their businesses, upon being arrested and incarcerated. Unlike developing countries, developed countries have stronger rule of law and do not suffer from nearly as much corruption. Hence, it is difficult for drug lords to operate in developed countries, such as the United States or Canada, in modern times. However, it is still relatively common for drug lords and drug cartels to operate with certain levels of impunity in developing countries, especially Latin American countries, such as Colombia, Venezuela, Brazil, and Mexico, in modern times.

Another trend that has been emerging in the last decade is a willingness of local authorities to cooperate with foreign nations, most notably the U.S., in an effort to apprehend and incarcerate drug lords. Some countries have been more willing to extradite their drug lords to face charges in other countries, an act that not only benefits them directly but also gives them favor with foreign governments. Mexico extradited 63 drug dealers to the U.S. in 2006. However, extradition may be prohibited if the person faces either the death penalty or a life sentence without the possibility of parole. Nevertheless, such efforts have failed to curb the rise of new drug lords because of widespread corruption in foreign countries, especially Latin American countries. Today, there are also many drug lords in Latin America, who have never been extradited, and continue to operate with impunity.

== Organizational role ==
Since 1967, research on organized crime leadership (and, by extension, drug lords) has evolved. Where once studies emphasised the importance of the leader's human capital (e.g. individual traits), it has now developed to focus upon the leader's social capital (e.g. information and resource brokers, social status, access to information).

== See also ==
- Drug barons of Colombia
- Drug cartel
- List of Mexico's 37 most-wanted drug lords
- War on drugs
