= Smart and TGR networks =

International money-laundering networks

The Smart and TGR networks were two money laundering networks that were shut down by an international police operation in 2024. The networks provided services for clients based in Dubai. The TGR group was the more senior entity of the two according to United States authorities.

== Smart network ==
Ekaterina Zhdanova headed the Smart network and she worked with Khadzi-Murat Magomedov and Nikita Krasnov to enable money laundering.

== TGR network ==
George Rossi headed the TGR network, with second in command Elena Chirkinyan and Andrejs Bradens (also known as Andrejs Carenoks.

== Kinahan gang ==
The NCA said that the Kinahan Organised Crime Group was one of the criminal organisations that used the networks to launder money and bypass sanctions imposed on them by the United States government in 2022.

== Russian espionage ==
The Smart network was used to fund Russian espionage operations from late 2022 to summer 2023.

== Ransomware ==
The Smart network laundered over $2.3million in suspected ransoms paid to the Ryuk ransomware gang.

== Police operation ==
The National Crime Agency headed the operation, along with the Garda Síochána, Federal Bureau of Investigation, Drug Enforcement Administration, Office of Foreign Assets Control, Central Directorate of the Judicial Police and authorities in the United Arab Emirates. The investigation was known as Operation Destabilise.

The investigators witnessed handovers of cash at a street level followed immediately by cryptocurrency transactions of the same value.

The heads of the networks have been sanctioned by Office of Foreign Assets Control as well as four businesses related to TGR.

== Arrests, Convictions and Sentencing ==
84 people have been arrested as part of the operation, some are now serving jail sentences. Over £20m in cash and cryptocurrency has been seized.

In Ireland the Gardaí targeted the Irish branch of the money laundering, resulting in the conviction of Igor Logvinov in July 2023, with a sentence of three years. €57,200 was forfeited to the Irish state as it was the proceeds of drug trafficking.

== Kyrgyzstan ==
In August 2025, Altair Holding SA, a company linked to George Rossi, was sanctioned in the UK as part of a broader crackdown on Russian influence on banks and cryptocurrency networks.

Altair Holding SA bought a 75% share in Keremet Bank on 25 December 2024. The bank was subsequently identified in helping cross-border payments on behalf of Promsvyazbank, a bank owned by the Russian state. Promsvyazbank has supported Russian military-industrial companies.

The National Crime Agency says that Ilan Shor was also involved in sanctions evasion linked to Keremet Bank.
