= Lyons Crime Family =

Scottish criminal organisation

- Founded: 1990s
- Founded by: Eddie Lyons Snr
- Founding location: Glasgow, Scotland
- Years active: 1990s–present
- Territory: United Kingdom, Spain, United Arab Emirates
- Ethnicity: Scottish, Irish
- Criminal activities: Drug trafficking, money laundering, murder, arms trafficking, extortion, blackmailing
- Allies: KOCG; Moroccan mafia; Tamo Junto Gang
- Rivals: Daniel Crime Family; Hutch Organized Crime Gang; Grendon Crime Family; Thomson clan

The Lyons Crime Family is an organised crime group in Glasgow, Scotland involved in various activities, including drug trafficking, money laundering, extortion and violence. Since 2001, the Lyons family has been embroiled in a longstanding and deadly feud with another Glasgow-based crime family, the Daniel Crime Family.

The family's origins can be traced back to the Milton and Possilpark areas in north Glasgow, where the Lyons family had lived for generations. The Lyons are known for their brutal tactics. Over the years, the Lyons Crime Family has been involved in a number of high-profile crimes, including the murder of Kevin 'Gerbil' Carroll in 2010. The organisation has also been linked to a number of drug trafficking and money laundering operations. The Glasgow Times noted in November 2022 that "Steven Lyons is feeling the heat after the recent busts and left Dubai. A lot of his trusted inner circle are either in jail or in exile, which has left him feeling vulnerable. He needed to make a change."

== History ==
The feud between the Lyons and Daniel families began in 2001 when a consignment of cocaine belonging to the Daniels was stolen from a house in the Milton area of Glasgow and sold by the Lyons.

In December 2006, Steven Lyons survived a shooting at an MOT garage owned by his uncle in Lambhill, Glasgow.

In January 2010, Daniel family enforcer Kevin "Gerbil" Carroll was shot and killed by a masked man while sitting in an Audi A3 in an Asda car park in Robroyston, Glasgow. Ross Monaghan was acquitted of Carroll's murder in May 2012.

Monaghan survived a shooting in 2017 when he was wounded in the shoulder as he dropped off his daughter at a primary school in Glasgow. He subsequently moved to Spain's Costa del Sol. On 31 May 2025, Eddie Lyons Jr and Ross Monaghan were shot dead by a masked gunman after watching the 2025 UEFA Champions League Final at Monaghans Bar in Fuengirola on the Costa del Sol.

Steven Lyons is also believed to have connections with the Dubai-based Kinahan Organized Crime Group.

On 17 September 2025, four prominent figures linked to the Lyons Crime Family were arrested in Dubai. Among those detained were Steven Lyons, the reputed head of the organisation; Ross McGill, a former Rangers football ultra turned gangland figure; Stephen Jamieson, an associate of convicted trafficker Jamie "Iceman" Stevenson; and Steven Larwood, a known Lyons affiliate previously based in Spain.

Police Scotland suspect the four men of involvement in drug importation and orchestrating violent acts linked to a wider feud between rival gangs in Scotland. Their arrests are considered significant, with sources describing the individuals as "operating at the highest level of organised crime, both at a UK and an international level."

On 27 March 2026, Police Scotland and Spain's Guardia Civil carried out coordinated raids in Scotland and Spain as part of a two-year investigation into serious organised crime. Eight men were arrested in Scotland and five in Spain. Eurojust said the organised criminal network was suspected of transporting large quantities of drugs, including hundreds of kilograms of cocaine, into Scotland, and of establishing an international money laundering network involving several million euros. Europol said the operation also involved support from authorities in the Netherlands, Turkey and the United Arab Emirates, and that assets in Turkey were seized during the investigation.

On 28 March 2026, Steven Lyons was arrested at I Gusti Ngurah Rai International Airport in Bali after arriving on a flight from Singapore. The Ngurah Rai Immigration Office said he had been detained following an Interpol alert and described him as being suspected of leading an international criminal organisation and involvement in fictitious companies and money laundering. BBC News reported that the request for his arrest was believed to have come via Spain's Guardia Civil, and that he was expected to face extradition proceedings in Spain. Police Scotland said it was aware of the arrest and was working with European partners.

On 30 March 2026, it was reported that Amanda Lyons, the partner of Steven Lyons, had been arrested in Dubai on the same day as his detention in Bali. Her arrest was understood to be linked to offences alleged to have been committed in Spain and followed the issuance of an Interpol red notice. Police Scotland confirmed it was aware of the arrest of a Scottish woman in Dubai and was working with European partners. The coordinated arrests formed part of a wider international investigation involving authorities in Scotland and Spain, targeting organised crime activities including money laundering and the use of alleged fictitious companies.
