= Thomas Kavanagh (Irish criminal) =

Irish criminal

Thomas "Bomber" Kavanagh is an Irish criminal and a senior member of the Kinahan Organised Crime Group founded by Christy Kinahan.

He was one of the first targets of the Criminal Assets Bureau (CAB) when it was established and is currently in jail serving a 21-year sentence.

== Byrne organised crime ==
He is a member of the Byrne organised crime group, a branch of the Kinahan crime organisation. Originally led by Christy Kinahan, it was then led by Freddie Thompson, then by Kavanagh's brother-in-law Liam Byrne. He also has influence with the Dubai-based leadership of organisation.

In 1990 he was found guilty of a firearms offence that led to a seven-year term in an Irish prison.

In July 1999 CAB secured an order against Kavanagh for IR £106,000 for unpaid taxes on income the bureau said was derived from criminal activity. His house on Knocknarea Avenue, Drimnagh was seized.

In October 2000 he was one of a group of people who assaulted a witness in the Four Courts who had testified against Liam Byrne.

In 2016 he attended the funeral of his brother-in-law David Byrne who had been shot dead as part of the Hutch-Kinahan feud.

== Move to UK ==
He moved to the UK after 2000 and settled in Tamworth. Christy Kinahan had previously settled in this town when he first left Ireland.

He has his own gang based in Birmingham.

=== Car dealership ===
Like his brother-in-law, he runs a luxury car dealership in the UK.

Gardaí believe that the dealership is a front for laundering drug money and that cars have been exchanged between criminal-owned companies as payment for drugs. It also allows a group of criminals in England and Ireland to have access to luxury cars which they do not own and cannot be seized from them.

== Convictions in UK ==
In 2017 he was given a sixteen-month suspended sentence for failing to declare taxable income and supplying false payslips to secure a mortgage.

In September 2019 he was jailed at Stoke-on-Trent Crown Court for three years for possessing a 10,000-volt stun gun disguised as a torch along with other weaponry found in his house. During the trial it emerged that an Osman warning had been issued to him in early 2018.

On 12 January 2019 Kavanagh was arrested at Birmingham airport as he returned from a holiday in Mexico. In July 2020 Thomas Kavanagh, along with Gary Vickery and Daniel Canning pleaded guilty to drugs and money-laundering offences at Ipswich Crown Court.

In March 2022 the court sentenced Kavanagh, Vickery and Canning to jail for 21 years, 20 years and 19 years six months respectively. The judge said that all three of the men had played a leading role in the criminal organisation. He also said that they could be released on licence, by which time Kavanagh will be 65.

The deputy director of the National Crime Agency said that they had dismantled the Kinahan operation in the UK and that the proceeds of crime investigation into the assets and financing of the gang continued.

== Criminal Assets Bureau ==
In March 2022 it was revealed that the Criminal Assets Bureau was pursuing a case against Kavanagh, as well as Jim Mansfield Jnr and Daniel Kinahan. The case has been pursued for over a year in secret, with Mansfield as the main target, with Kavanagh and Kinahan, among others, as respondents.

== Firearms charges in UK ==
In August 2023 Kavanagh and two other men were charged with firearms offences in the UK. They appeared in Westminster Magistrates court and were remanded to appear at the Old Bailey on 5 September 2023. On September 18, 2023, he admitted that he had plotted to fool the National Crime Agency by claiming to have intelligence about an arms cache in the hope he would get a reduced sentence. He gathered and hid a cache of firearms and told the agency through his solicitor of the location in County Down. The firearms were retrieved by police but the plot to trick the NCA was revealed by EncroChat messages.

In October 2024 he was sentenced to six years in prison to be served concurrently with his twenty-one year sentence after pleading guilty. His brother-in-law was sentenced to five years to be served concurrently with a twenty-one year sentence.

== NCA investigation into assets ==
The National Crime Agency concluded that Kavanagh had made £12.2 million in criminal profits with over £1.1 million recoverable. The assets include a 50% share in what the NCA called a "fortified family mansion" in Tamworth. Money from sale of other properties in Spain and the UK, along with £150,000 of expensive items seized when Kavanaghs' house was raided were also found to be part of his assets. Kavanagh was told he had three months to pay the £1.1 million or he would face another 12 years in jail.
