= Graham Whelan =

Irish criminal

Graham "the wig" Whelan is an Irish criminal who is part of the Kinahan Organised Crime Group.

== Early life ==
He is originally from Clonard Road in Crumlin.

== Criminal history ==
=== Crumlin-Drimnagh feud ===
He was one of three men arrested in the Holiday Inn Hotel in Pearse Street in 2000 for possession of €1.6 million worth of ecstasy tablets and cocaine. He was 17 at the time and told Gardaí that he could do ten years in jail "standing on his head".

The arrests resulted in the Crumlin-Drimnagh feud, in which he sided with Freddie Thompson. He was given a six-year sentence after conviction and Phillip Griffiths was sentenced to seven years. Declan Gavin, the third man arrested, was fatally stabbed a week before his trial was due to start.

In 2006 hitman Gary Bryan was murdered as part of the feud. Whelan was arrested in 2007 in relation to this, but later released without charge, as was David Byrne.

He moved to the UK in 2011 and was connected to Thomas Kavanagh.

=== Spain arrest ===
He was convicted of grievous bodily harm in Spain in 2016 after a brawl and sentenced to two years imprisonment suspended.

=== Ballsbridge arrest ===
On 31 January 2019 he was arrested in the International Hotel, Ballsbridge. He was found in possession of an Audemars Piguet Royal Oak gentleman's watch and €1,275, both of which were later found to be the proceeds of crime. When asked where he got the money, he replied "up me Swiss roll" and told them to keep the money.

At the Special Criminal Court defence council admitted that he had been "truculent" but that he had since become cooperative.

He pleaded guilty to possession of the watch and cash, knowing them to be proceeds of crime and also of paying €2,140 for a three night stay at the International Hotel, knowing or believing the money to be proceeds of crime.

In November 2021 he was sentenced to four years imprisonment, reduced to three years because of his early guilty plea and 18 months of the that sentence was suspended. It was mentioned in court that he had 33 previous convictions, 5 for drug-related offences.

== Personal life ==
He and his wife have four children.
