= Graeme Biggar =

Scottish bureaucrat (born 1974)

Graeme Biggar CBE
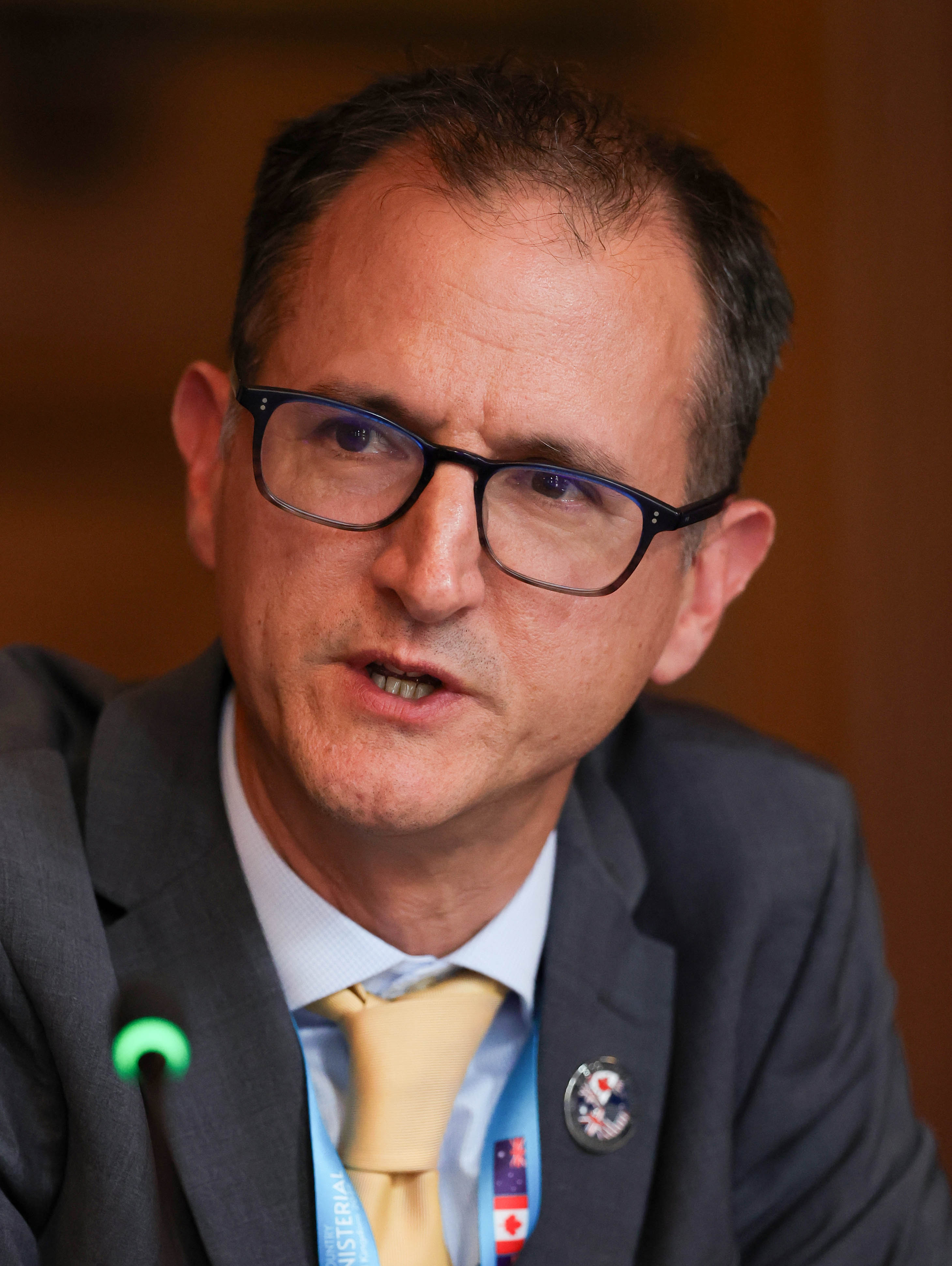
- Biggar in 2025

Director General of the National Crime Agency
- Incumbent
- Assumed office 5 October 2021
- Preceded by: Lynne Owens

Personal details
- Born: 13 August 1974 (age 52)
- Awards: Commander of the Order of the British Empire (2019)

Graeme Biggar (born 13 August 1974) is the Director General of the National Crime Agency. Biggar has been in the role since August 2022, and has led the Agency on an interim basis since October 2021. Biggar joined the National Crime Agency (NCA) as the Director General of the National Economic Crime Centre (NECC) in March 2019.

== Early life and education ==
Biggar was born in Glasgow to parents Hamish, an accountant, and Sue, a physiotherapist. He was educated at Glasgow Academy, Aldwickbury School and Uppingham School. He studied Modern History at the University of Oxford. He later attended the Royal College of Defence Studies in 2011–12, graduating with a MA degree with Distinction in International Security and Strategy.

== Career ==
=== Ministry of Defence ===
In 1997, Biggar joined the Civil Service Fast Stream in the Ministry of Defence where he worked for most of the next twenty years, other than a year in the New Zealand Ministry of Defence in 2000–01, and three years in the Department for Environment, Food and Rural Affairs between 2003 and 2006.

Between 2006 and 2011, Biggar worked on management and reform of the Ministry of Defence, including supporting the 2011 Lord Levene Defence Reform Group review.

In 2013, he became Head of Operational Policy in the Ministry of Defence but was quickly promoted to Director as the Chief of Staff to the Defence Secretary, first Philip Hammond and then Michael Fallon.

=== Home Office ===
Biggar became Director National Security in the Home Office in 2016, where he worked on countering terrorism and state threats. In that role, he oversaw the implementation of the Investigatory Powers Act 2016 and responded to the 2017 terrorist attacks and to the 2018 poisoning of Sergei and Yulia Skripal.

=== National Crime Agency ===
In 2019, Biggar moved to the National Crime Agency, becoming Director General of the National Economic Crime Centre. In 2021, he was appointed interim Director General of the National Crime Agency, before becoming its permanent Director General in 2022. He leads about 6,000 officers based in the UK and overseas.

== Honours ==
Biggar was appointed a Commander of the Order of the British Empire (CBE) in 2019.
