= Grendon crime family =

Irish organised crime syndicate

- Years active: 1980s—present
- Territory: Ireland
- Ethnicity: Irish
- Activities: Drug trafficking, weapons smuggling, money laundering, extortion
- Allies: Kinahan OCG; Hutch OCG; 14K
- Rivals: Albanian mafia; Rathkeale Rovers crews; Gucci Gang; other small local drug gangs

The Grendon Crime Family or Grendon Organised Crime Gang (commonly referred to by law enforcement and media as The Family) is an organised crime syndicate based in Ireland. Emerging in the late 20th century, the group has grown into one of the most influential domestic criminal organisations in the country. The Family has been linked to large-scale drug trafficking, money laundering, firearms smuggling, extortion, and contract violence.

In recent years, the Garda National Drugs and Organised Crime Bureau has identified the Grendon organisation as a top priority for dismantlement, describing it as the most significant Irish-based drug trafficking network operating within the state.

The Family is believed to have originated in the 1980s and 1990s as a loose association of Dublin-based criminals involved in protection rackets and street-level drug sales. By the early 2000s, under the leadership of senior members of the Grendon family, the group consolidated into a hierarchical structure.

During this period, The Family expanded from local racketeering into the importation of cocaine, cannabis, and heroin. The gang gained a reputation for violence, enforcing discipline within its ranks through intimidation, shootings, and targeted assaults.

Unlike the Kinahan Organised Crime Group, which operates internationally, The Family’s operations are concentrated within Ireland. While The Family has clashed with smaller regional gangs over territory, Garda sources suggest the group has occasionally acted as a domestic distribution partner for international cartels, avoiding open conflict with the Kinahans in recent years.

== Structure and leadership ==
The Family is described as a family-led but networked organisation. Gardaí believe that several brothers and extended relatives of the Grendon family control strategic decision-making, while younger associates act as enforcers and couriers.

- Leadership: Senior Grendon figures, allegedly directing operations from both within Ireland and abroad.
- Enforcers: Trusted lieutenants responsible for violence, intimidation, and territorial control.
- Associates: A large pool of street-level dealers, debt collectors, and launderers, many of whom are not direct family members.

The gang also makes use of clean skins — individuals without criminal records — to operate front businesses and transport drugs undetected.

== Criminal activities ==
The Family has been identified as one of the largest domestic suppliers of narcotics in Ireland. Gardaí estimate that the group is responsible for importing multi-tonne consignments of cocaine, cannabis, and heroin annually, often in collaboration with continental European trafficking networks.

Investigators have uncovered a variety of laundering techniques, including the use of legitimate businesses such as car dealerships, pubs, and tanning salons. Encrypted messaging platforms and cryptocurrency have also been used to conceal profits.

The organisation has been linked to several seizures of military-grade firearms, including assault rifles and submachine guns, smuggled into Ireland for use in gangland feuds and enforcement activities.

The Family has been connected to a series of shootings, arson attacks, and threats against rivals and suspected informants. Members of the gang are believed to have carried out contract killings on behalf of allied groups.

== Law enforcement action and current status ==
The Family has been subjected to ongoing Garda and international operations. In 2020, Operation Tara targeted mid-level associates linked to heroin distribution in Dublin and Cork. In 2023, a Europol-led investigation disrupted a logistics network tied to the Family, seizing over €15 million worth of cocaine. In 2025, Garda Commissioner Drew Harris named The Family as the “primary target” of GNDOCB, citing their role as Ireland’s most powerful drug traffickers.

Several senior members are currently serving long prison sentences for drug trafficking, firearms offences, and violent crime. Despite this, the organisation is believed to remain active through younger associates. As of 2025, The Family remains a major force in the Irish underworld. While facing sustained Garda pressure, the gang has demonstrated adaptability, employing encrypted communications, logistics hubs, and legitimate business fronts to sustain operations. Analysts suggest that unless its leadership structure is fully dismantled, The Family is likely to continue dominating domestic narcotics distribution in Ireland for the foreseeable future.
