= Glen Ward (criminal) =

Irish criminal (born 1993)

- Born: 3 February 1993 (age 33); Ballymun, Dublin, Ireland
- Other name: "Mr Flashy"
- Organization: "Gucci Gang"
- Children: 1
- Status: Imprisoned
- Criminal charges: Firearm possession

Glen Ward (born 3 February 1993) is an Irish criminal. Named by media sources up until 2025 as "Mr Flashy" for legal reasons, Ward was the leader of an organised crime group in Finglas dubbed the "Gucci Gang", with links to the Kinahan Organised Crime Group. The gang were involved in the sale of drugs and in criminal feuds in Finglas, involving attacks and petrol bombing of homes. Ward is currently serving a five and a half year jail sentence for firearm possession.

== Early life ==
Born in Ballymun on 3 February 1993, Ward later moved to Finglas with his family. He had been involved in crime from an early age, and was part of an organised crime group led by criminal Trevor Byrne, involved with the Kinahan Organised Crime Group. In 2016, facing criminal charges for robbery, Byrne fled Ireland, leaving Ward in control of this criminal enterprise. Ward also had connections to the Kinahan gang through drug dealer Ian O'Heaire, a friend of Ward's who was a cousin of senior Kinahan gang member Ross Browning.

In his 2025 trial, the court heard that Ward was trained as a mechanic, and had a long-term partner and a child.

== "Gucci Gang" ==
As media sources could not legally name Ward due to the fact he had not been convicted, the moniker "Mr Flashy" was given to him, due to his propensity for designer clothes. For this reason, the crime group he led were dubbed the "Gucci Gang". The gang operated from a house on Ratoath Drive in Finglas which they had taken over in 2016, in a process known as "cuckooing", where a house, usually belonging to a vulnerable person, is taken over and used as a base for criminal activities. The house had been fitted with bulletproof glass, fortified doors and CCTV, with pitbull dogs outside defending it. It was reported in 2019 that teenage gang members, some as young as 15, were using electric scooters to deliver crack cocaine around Finglas. The gang were noted to use social media to target rival criminals and their families, videoing themselves attacking other criminals and their homes.

Ward and his gang were repeatedly involved in feuds with other organised crime groups. In 2017, he was delivered a Garda Information Message by Gardaí, informing him that his life was under threat. The following May, 31-year-old Shane Fowler died in a road crash; he was believed to have been on his way to commit a shooting against the gang.

In the Coolock feud in 2019, a number of Ward's associates were killed; Zach Parker, Seán Little, Jordan Davis and Hamid Sanambar were all shot dead in the span of several months. Another associate, Caolan Smyth, was arrested the same year and charged with the attempted murder of Hutch Organised Crime Gang member James "Mago" Gately. Ward's enforcer, Scott Capper, was given a three-and-a-half year jail sentence the same year for an assault in Dublin city. As his allies began to disappear, Ward was forced to enlist a crew of younger criminals, including juveniles and teenagers, and his younger brother Eric O'Driscoll. In 2021, Ward was one of eight men arrested, including a teenage boy, over a €60,000 seizure of cocaine in Temple Bar. Also in 2021, it was reported that rivals of Ward had stolen his dog and were sending him videos to taunt him over this.

In April 2022, James Whelan was shot dead. 29-year-old Whelan, a former Gucci Gang member, had fallen out with Ward and was a leader in a faction that has broken away from the gang. On the night he was killed, Gardaí believed he had entered the Deanstown estate in Finglas, where Ward lived, with the intention of committing an arson attack, but had been spotted and shot dead. Ward was not believed to have been personally involved in the murder but his gang were believed to have played a role. Following this event, a feud ensued between the two groups, during which Whelan's mother's house was firebombed. In October 2023, a house belonging to an innocent woman related to Ward was shot at.

In 2023, Ward and O'Driscoll were given a two year suspended jail sentence for handling 18 bottles of wine that had been stolen from a Marco Pierre White restaurant on Dawson Street. The prosecution alleged that the pair had acted as lookouts for the theft.

== Gun charges and jail sentence ==
On New Year's Day 2022, Ward and O'Driscoll were filmed firing a gun from the back of a house in Finglas, as well as filming a number of weapons and rounds of ammunition. Gardaí searched the house two months later and found both weapons. In June 2022, there was an attempt on Ward's life as he sat in a taxi on Tolka Valley Road in Finglas; he escaped on foot. Following this attempt, Gardaí searched the taxi Ward had been in and found a phone, as well as a bank card in O'Driscoll's name. Following the discovery of this video on the phone, both men were arrested and pleaded guilty to firearm possession.

Having previously been unnamed in media reports for legal reasons, in March 2025, Ward was officially confirmed to be the man known as "Mr Flashy" in a Criminal Assets Bureau case.

On 28 April 2025, Ward was jailed for five and a half years, with an additional nine months suspended conditionally, while O'Driscoll was given a five year sentence a month prior for the same offense. The following month, Ward was given an 18-month suspended sentence on charges of violent disorder related to an altercation in Finglas.

In May 2025, the Sunday World reported that Ward was on 23-hour lockup in a prison that could not be identified due to the number of criminals who wanted to kill him, and had completely lost control of the gang he once ran.
