= Ross Browning =

Irish criminal associated with the Kinahan Organised Crime Organisation

Ross Browning is an Irish criminal and member of the Kinahan Organised Crime Group.

== Early life ==
He was originally from Hardwicke Street flats in Dublin.

Browning received a conviction, aged 18, for armed robbery.

== Assets seized ==
In February 2023 the High Court ruled that over one million euro of assets linked to Browning had been obtained as proceedings of crime. The assets had been seized in 2018 and included motor vehicles, property in north County Dublin, luxury watches and jewellery. The Criminal Assets Bureau were authorised to seize the assets.

The properties were in Garristown, land in Rush and a house in Deanstown Road, Finglas.

In mid July 2023, "Chestnut Lodge" in Garristown was seized by the Criminal Assets Bureau.

== Kinahan association ==
According to the judge, Browning attended the wedding of Daniel Kinahan in Dubai in 2017 and the wedding of Christopher Kinahan Jr in Spain in 2010. He has also been associated with Liam Byrne. The judge described Browning as a senior member of the Kinahan gang.

== Spain ==
In 2022, Browning faces charges in Spain of unlawful possession of a firearm, a Glock 19 handgun, seized in 2010 near Malaga.
