= Crumlin–Drimnagh feud =

Criminal gang rivalry in Dublin, Ireland

Crumlin-Drimnagh feud
- Date: 2000-2016
- Location: South inner city Dublin, Ireland
- Caused by: Drugs
- Methods: Beatings, stabbings, shootings and pipe bomb attacks

Parties
Crumlin gang	Drimnagh gang

Casualties
- Deaths: 16
- Arrested: 4

The Crumlin-Drimnagh feud is a feud between rival criminal gangs in south inner city Dublin, Ireland. The feud began in 2000 when a drugs seizure led to a split in a gang of young criminals in their late teens and early twenties, most of whom had grown up together and went to the same school. The resulting violence has led to 16 murders and scores of beatings, stabbings, shootings and pipe bomb attacks.

== Background ==
By 2000 a group of young friends from Crumlin, Drimnagh and the south inner city had graduated from stealing cars and street dealing to become major suppliers of drugs in South Dublin. They developed contacts with a major Irish drugs trafficker in Spain who supplied them with cocaine, ecstasy and cannabis. Many of the shipments he delivered to Ireland also included guns which were later used in the feud. Martin "Marlo" Hyland, a major organised crime figure from North Dublin also supplied guns to one of the feuding factions.

On 9 March 2000 at the Holiday Inn on Pearse Street, three members of the gang were arrested with 2 kg of cocaine and 49,000 ecstasy tablets. All three refused to co-operate with investigating detectives. Declan Gavin, 20, a senior member of the gang was released after two days of questioning without being charged because he wasn't actually in the room with the drugs when Gardaí entered. The other two junior members of the gang, who were in the room, were charged with possession of cocaine and ecstasy with intent to supply. Graham "the wig" Whelan was one of them. Although there is no evidence to suggest Gavin was an informer, his release led to him immediately being labelled a "rat" by some gang members. This resulted in the gang splitting into two rival factions with Freddie Thompson, from Loreto Road in Maryland, leading one group and Brian Rattigan, from Cooley Road in Drimnagh, leading the other.

== First murders ==
The first victim of the feud was 21-year old Declan Gavin who was murdered in August 2001. He was stabbed to death outside an Abrakebabra fast food restaurant in Crumlin by a masked man who escaped in a getaway car driven by an accomplice. The next killed was Joseph Rattigan, 18, brother of gang leader Brian. He was shot dead on Cooley Road in Drimnagh in July 2002. In 2003 Brian Rattigan was arrested for shooting at Gardaí in their patrol car as they pursued the car Rattigan was travelling in. Although Rattigan received a 13-year prison sentence for this incident, he continued to control the gang from his prison cell.

Paul Warren, 24, who was a suspect in Joseph Rattigan's murder, was shot dead in a public house in Newmarket Square in February 2004. While Warren was drinking, two masked and armed men came into the pub, one stood at the front door guarding customers, while the other chased Warren in to the toilets and shot him twice, once in the face. Brian Rattigan was suspected of organizing the hit from prison using a mobile phone.

== 2005-2007 ==
John Roche, 25, from Crumlin and a suspect in the Warren hit, was shot dead as he walked to his apartment in Kilmainham in March 2005. There were three killings in two days in November 2005 beginning with Darren Geoghegan, 26, from Drimnagh, and Gavin Byrne, 30, from Crumlin. Both men, who were senior members of the Thompson faction, were shot dead as they sat in a Lexus car in Firhouse after being lured to a meeting. Two days later Noel Roche, a brother of John, was shot dead as he sat in traffic on Clontarf Road. His driver escaped unharmed.

Wayne Zambra, 21, was shot dead as he sat in his car on Cameron Street in August 2006. A month later Gary Bryan, 31, was shot dead as he worked on a car outside his girlfriend's house in Walkinstown. Both men were part of the Rattigan faction. Three months later in December 2006, Eddie McCabe, 21, was tortured and beaten to death after he was abducted by Rattigan gang members. His mutilated body was dumped in a lane way in Inchicore.

== 2008-2009 ==
Shay O'Byrne, 27, was shot dead in front of his girlfriend (Brian Rattigan's sister) by a masked gunman outside their home in Tallaght in March 2009.

There was a grenade attack on the home of a Thompson gang member on Knockarea Avenue in Drimnagh in June 2008. Despite extensive damage to the front of the house, there were no injuries to the five adults and one child inside at the time. Gardaí suspect the attack was linked to two other shootings days previously, one where a grandmother in her 50s was shot and injured in the shoulder.

In July 2009, Anthony Cannon, 26, from Robert Street in the south inner city, was shot several times in the head in front of women and children at St. Mary's Avenue in Ballyfermot, west Dublin. His killer escaped on a motorcycle with an accomplice. Cannon, who was a senior member of the Rattigan gang, was wearing a bullet proof vest when he died and was a suspect in over a dozen serious incidents linked to the feud in the year before his death.

== Conclusion ==
Brian Rattigan was convicted of murdering Declan Gavin after a trial in December 2009. He was sentenced to life in prison to add to the 13-year sentence he got for shooting at Gardaí in 2003. With the killing of Cannon and Rattigan's murder conviction, it had been hoped by those in the local community that the feud would end, with Thompson's rivals appearing to have more or less admitted defeat. However two killings in as many days brought the feud back to media attention. Gerard Eglington, 27, was shot dead in front of his 11-year-old step-daughter and infant son in his home in Portarlington, County Laois, on 24 September 2012. The next day Declan O'Reilly, 34, who had survived a previous attempt on his life, was shot dead in front of his young son as they walked along the South Circular Road in Dublin. Gardaí suspect both murders were ordered by a close associate of Freddie Thompson. Eglington's murder brought about the defeat of the Rattigan faction. On 13 February 2013 Brian Rattigan was convicted of running a drugs network from his prison cell in Portlaoise prison and given an additional 17-year sentence.

== Convictions ==
All but three of the murders remain unsolved. As well as Brian Rattigan's conviction for the Gavin murder, twenty-three-year-old Craig White was convicted of Noel Roche's murder and was given a life sentence in July 2009 after his DNA was found on a pair of gloves that were found near the abandoned getaway car. Gardaí suspect that White, who refused to talk during Garda interviews, was the driver while Paddy Doyle, who was killed in Spain in 2008, was the gunman. Garrett O'Brien (35) and Eugene Cullen (30) were convicted after separate trials, and sentenced to life imprisonment for the murder of Shay O'Byrne in 2009. Freddie Thompson was convicted of murder in 2018. He was sentenced to life in prison for organising the murder of David Douglas in a killing linked to the Hutch-Kinahan feud.

== See also ==
- Hutch–Kinahan feud, the ongoing conflict between the Kinahan Cartel and the Hutch Gang in Ireland which arose as a consequence of this conflict.
