= Director General of the National Crime Agency =

Head of the NCA in the United Kingdom

- Incumbent; Graeme Biggar since 5 October 2021
- Reports to: Home Secretary; Security Minister
- Appointer: Home Secretary
- Term length: 5 years, terms renewable or extendable for less than 5 years
- Inaugural holder: Keith Bristow
- Formation: 7 October 2013
- Deputy: Rob Jones (Operations); James Babbage (Threats); Steve Rodhouse (Strategic Projects); Claire Smith (Chief Operating Officer)
- Salary: £214,722
- Website: NCA.gov.uk

The Director General of the National Crime Agency is the head of the National Crime Agency (NCA) in the United Kingdom, and as such is responsible for the overall management of the NCA. The Director General is appointed by, and reports to, the Home Secretary, but is not directly part of the Home Office. The Director General is appointed on a five-year term basis, though this can be renewed (for another five-year term) or extended (for any period less than five years) at the Home Secretary's discretion. The Home Secretary's power to select and appoint the Director General, and determine the terms and conditions of their appointment, is provided by the Crime and Courts Act 2013.

As the Director General is in charge of a national agency with jurisdiction and investigative powers across the entire country, this post is considered to be the most senior police role in the United Kingdom, outranking the Metropolitan Police Commissioner, as the Director General has the power to direct any chief constables and commissioners. The Director General is supported by three Deputy Directors General, in charge of Operations, Capabilities, and Economic Crime.

The incumbent role holder is Graeme Biggar, who was appointed following the medical retirement of Lynne Owens.

== NCA Directors General ==
| # | Picture | Name | Term began | Term ended | Length | Prior post | Home Secretary | Ref |
|---|---|---|---|---|---|---|---|---|
| 1 | | Keith Bristow | 7 October 2013 | 3 January 2016 | 2 years and 89 days | Chief Constable of Warwickshire Police | Theresa May | |
| 2 | | Dame Lynne Owens | 4 January 2016 | 4 October 2021 | 5 years and 274 days | Chief Constable of Surrey Police | Theresa May | |
| 2 | | Dame Lynne Owens | 4 January 2016 | 4 October 2021 | 5 years and 274 days | Chief Constable of Surrey Police | Amber Rudd | |
| 2 | | Dame Lynne Owens | 4 January 2016 | 4 October 2021 | 5 years and 274 days | Chief Constable of Surrey Police | Sajid Javid | |
| 2 | | Dame Lynne Owens | 4 January 2016 | 4 October 2021 | 5 years and 274 days | Chief Constable of Surrey Police | Priti Patel | |
| – | | Graeme Biggar (interim) | 5 October 2021 | 11 August 2022 | 311 days | Director General of the National Economic Crime Centre | Priti Patel | |
| 3 | | Graeme Biggar | 12 August 2022 | Incumbent | 4 years and 27 days | Interim Director General of the National Crime Agency (Concurrent Director General of the National Economic Crime Centre) | Priti Patel | |
| 3 | | Graeme Biggar | 12 August 2022 | Incumbent | 4 years and 27 days | Interim Director General of the National Crime Agency (Concurrent Director General of the National Economic Crime Centre) | Suella Braverman | |
| 3 | | Graeme Biggar | 12 August 2022 | Incumbent | 4 years and 27 days | Interim Director General of the National Crime Agency (Concurrent Director General of the National Economic Crime Centre) | Grant Shapps | |
| 3 | | Graeme Biggar | 12 August 2022 | Incumbent | 4 years and 27 days | Interim Director General of the National Crime Agency (Concurrent Director General of the National Economic Crime Centre) | Suella Braverman | |
| 3 | | Graeme Biggar | 12 August 2022 | Incumbent | 4 years and 27 days | Interim Director General of the National Crime Agency (Concurrent Director General of the National Economic Crime Centre) | James Cleverly | |
| 3 | | Graeme Biggar | 12 August 2022 | Incumbent | 4 years and 27 days | Interim Director General of the National Crime Agency (Concurrent Director General of the National Economic Crime Centre) | Yvette Cooper | |
| 3 | | Graeme Biggar | 12 August 2022 | Incumbent | 4 years and 27 days | Interim Director General of the National Crime Agency (Concurrent Director General of the National Economic Crime Centre) | Shabana Mahmood | |

== See also ==
- Director General of MI5
- Commissioner of Police of the Metropolis
