= Operation Destabilise =

International investigation

- Years active: 2021–present
- Territory: Russia; Middle East; United Arab Emirates; Europe; United Kingdom; South America; United States
- Activities: Money laundering, assisting Russian nationals in avoiding sanction
- Notable members: Smart: Ekaterina Zhdanova; Khadzi-Murat Magomedov; Nikita Krasnov; TGR Group: George Rossi; Elena Chirkinyan; Andrejs Bradens

Operation Destabilise was an international investigation led by the National Crime Agency (NCA) which, over the course of three years, uncovered a money laundering ring with ties to criminal organisations in the UK, drug cartels in South America, the Kinahan Organised Crime Group, Russian espionage efforts and sanction avoidance.

Between 2021 and late 2024, the National Crime Agency, alongside law enforcement agencies in Ireland, France, Finland, Spain, the Netherlands, the US and the United Arab Emirates, investigated the ring. Initially, the Russian ransomware group Ryuk was linked to Ekaterina Zhdanova, head of the Smart cryptocurrency exchange in Moscow. Soon after, TGR Group, also based in Moscow and headed by George Rossi, was discovered. Smart and TGR were linked to various ransomware groups, though the investigation into them was initially focused on global money laundering until the first evidence of cash handovers in the UK were discovered in November 2021. The discovery of these cash handovers then led to the discovery of courier networks operating across the UK and the Channel Islands, which collected dirty money from various criminal groups within the UK to be laundered through various means in the UK and Europe before being turned into cryptocurrency. A portion of this cryptocurrency would then be transferred to Zhdanova and/or TGR Group, which would either be banked, transferred to Russia or to individuals dodging sanctions. The networks provided by Smart and TGR Group were, between late-2022 and mid-2023, also used by the Russian government to fund espionage operations.

The results of the investigation up to that point were released on 4 December 2024, revealing that 84 people had been arrested in connection with the ring, 71 of which were arrested in the UK. Six individuals, both major money laundering networks and several companies were sanctioned, while a seventh linked individual was arrested for the facilitation of money laundering. In total, £20 million had been seized out of an estimated £700 million in drugs sales.

The operation continued, with the NCA reporting on 21 November 2025 that the network was at that time known to be operating in at least 28 towns and cities across the UK, that they had arrested a further 44 people in connection with the networks and seized over £5.1 million in cash over the almost 12 months prior. Over the entire period of the operation up to 21 November 2025, the NCA had assisted international partners in seizing $24 million and over €2.6 million from the network.

== Investigation ==
The operation initially evolved from a National Crime Agency (NCA) investigation into the Russian ransomware group Ryuk. The group conducts ransomware across the world, including in the US and the UK. As of December 2024, Ryuk was believed to have raised at least £27 million from 149 organisations based in the UK. During the investigation, the NCA discovered that payments made to Ryuk were being sent towards Ekaterina Zhdanova, a Russian national and head of Smart, a cryptocurrency exchange based in Federation Tower, Moscow. Around the same time frame, the NCA uncovered TGR Group, also a cryptocurrency exchange based in Federation Tower. The NCA quickly linked the networks to global money laundering efforts and further ransomware groups like Conti and Trickbot. Up until that point, the investigation was focused on major money laundering abroad, though the NCA soon began intercepting the first cash handovers relating to the group in the UK.

The NCA didn't receive their first major breakthrough in relation to cash handovers until the arrest of Fawad Saiedi, who was stopped by Metropolitan Police in November 2021 while driving southbound on the M1 toward London. A search of the vehicle found that he was transporting over £250,000 in cash. A search of his home discovered a further £24,500 and a currency-counting machine. Upon further investigation into Saiedi, police found that he was a courier under a network that operated around the UK and the Channel Islands; said network was found to have participated in 55 cash handovers over a four-month period, operating on behalf of 22 criminal groups in the UK. In his role as a courier, it is known that he had transferred criminal property worth £15,667,720. He pleaded guilty to possessing and transferring criminal property on 3 May 2022 and was sentenced to 52 months imprisonment. Saiedi was found to have performed his role under the direction of Ekaterina and Nikita Krasnov, a coordinator for Russian-speaking couriers under Smart. Krasnov then further connected to other courier networks.

A month prior to Saiedi's arrest, Muhiddin Umurzokov, Anvarjon Eshonkulov and Batsukh Bataa were arrested in Jersey after they attempted to launder approximately £60,000 on the island. Evidence seized in searches of mobile phones, documents, receipts and lists revealed that they had been housing illegal immigrants in sub-let properties using money from drug trafficking and prostitution. It was revealed that Umurzokov, Eshonkulov and Bataa all had large sums of money moving in and out of their bank accounts, primarily through a company called ISM Scaffolding Limited, which had approximately £4.31 million moving through its account over a ten-month period in 2021/22. The group plead guilty to a combined total of 22 charges relating to money laundering and admitting to work for a UK based organised crime group and were sentenced a combined total of 10 years imprisonment.

=== Smart and TGR networks ===
Ekaterina Zhdanova was the head of Smart. It is believed that she was raised in Siberia before moving to Moscow and working in the finance industry. By July 2016, she had opened several hotels and leisure businesses in Moscow. Zhdanova worked closely with Khadzi-Murat Magomedov and Nikita Krasnov to facilitate money laundering, with many of the transactions being brokered by Zhdanova and Magomedov. Krasnov would then work with couriers in the UK to arrange for money to be collected and converted.

George Rossi is a Russian-born Ukrainian national who was the head of the TGR Group, which has an office in Oxford Circus, London, and in Dubai, United Arab Emirates (UAE). Evidence suggests that Rossi may have been a banker in Russia who moved to Europe temporarily before starting his network. He primarily worked alongside two individuals: Elena Chirkinyan, a joint-Russian and Armenian national who was reportedly his second in command. Chirkinyan stated that she had studied in both Moscow and Caterham School, a private school in Surrey, then at a university in London, where she studied business and economics; and Andrejs Bradens, a Latvian national. Rossi was also the founder of TGR Partners, non-executive director of TGR Corporate Concierge LTD and linked to several other companies.

According to the NCA, both networks had a "heavy exposure" to Garantex, a Russian cryptocurrency exchange which has been sanctioned by the Office of Foreign Assets Control (OFAC) and the United Kingdom due to its connections to payments made by the Russian government for western components used in weaponry during the Russian invasion of Ukraine.

Both networks worked together, operating in a combined 30 countries globally including in the Middle East (through which large sums of their money was trafficked), the West, the UK and Russia. TGR Group received large sums of money on behalf of Zhdanova, converting the funds received into cryptocurrency. From late-2022 until mid-2023, the Russian government used Smart to fund espionage operations. Upon this discovery, that aspect of the investigation was handed to MI5. The Russian government also used both networks to assist sanctioned individuals in bypassing sanctions implemented both prior and due to the Russian invasion of Ukraine.

==== Methods ====
A statement from Ben Cowdock, a senior investigations lead at the UK branch of Transparency International

There is growing evidence that Russia is embracing cryptocurrencies and other alternative payment systems in order to circumvent sanctions and transfer funds around the world [...] While the Kremlin's been closed out of the conventional banking sector, this does not mean it can no longer make international payments.

Smart and TGR Group would swap physical money into cryptocurrency through Tether, a company that provides a form of cryptocurrency called "stablecoin", cryptocurrency backed by physical currency (in this case, the US dollar) to provide stability. Tether was, as of December 2024, under investigation by the prosecutors in the Manhattan US Attorneys Office for its potential uses in money laundering and sanction avoidance, which the company denied following a report in The Wall Street Journal. The US Department of the Treasury was, in October that year, also considering implementing sanctions due to its "widespread" use by those sanctioned by the US, including Hamas, Russian arms dealers and several other major security threats.

They would then provide this cryptocurrency to criminal organisations in the UK and the West upon receiving physical currency through Smart's system of couriers organised by Krasnov; these criminals would then pay South American cartels for drugs using this cryptocurrency, repeating the cycle.

The physical money transported by the couriers would then be laundered through various means either in the UK or in Europe and either get transferred to cryptocurrency wallets in Zhdanova's name, or to TGR Group, who would either bank the money or transfer it to Russia or Russian individuals dodging sanctions in the West. It is believed that some sanctioned individuals used the system to invest in property in the UK and other goods, with the networks concealing the original source of the funds. According to the NCA, over £100 billion is laundered in or through the UK each year, with up to £5 billion being done using cryptocurrency. Will Lyne, Head of Cyber Intelligence in the NCA, estimated that over £100 million was moved in the UK each year by the networks.

The NCA's tactical lead for Operation Destabilise said that the groups were involved in transferring billions of dollars per year, though did say that the exact sum is difficult to calculate due to their methods. An NCA cryptocurrency investigator showed Wired some cryptocurrency wallets used by the groups, with one containing over £800 million and another containing approximately £169 million.

=== Further investigation ===
The UK was identified as a key hub in the international money laundering operation, with the NCA identifying similar networks across the UK with links to drugs and cryptocurrency, cartels in South America and the Kinahan Organised Crime Group which, although originating in Dublin, Ireland, has a hub in Dubai. The group is involved in trafficking drugs and firearms around the world, with links to Iran, Venezuela, Russia and Hezbollah.

In late 2022, the NCA followed a van for 300 miles in a round trip from Kensington, London, to Oldham. Surveillance footage showed that when the van returned to London, bags containing over £200,000 were removed from it. An apartment linked to the van was searched, revealing a cash counting machine and empty bags, while another property held approximately £400,000.

NCA Operations Manager, Saju Sasikumar, speaking on the operation ran by Semen Kuksov and Andrii Dzektsa

Semen Kuksov ran what was, in effect, a professional banking service for criminals around the world, who could not access the legitimate banking system due to the source of their funds [...] He arranged collection of cash from groups that wanted rid of it and delivered cash to groups that needed it.

This network was led by Semen Kuksov, the son of a former Russian executive for AKROS Oilfield Services Company, and Andrii Dzektsa. The network, which was formed in July 2022, was coordinated by Krasnov and collected money from criminal organisations in the UK and smuggled it into Europe to be laundered and operated a cryptocurrency exchange. Although subordinate to Kuksov, Dzektsa managed couriers, giving them directions as to where and when to collect money. Over a single 74 day period, the network helped to launder £12,329,460. The NCA revealed that cryptocurrency wallets connected to Kuksov had received over £30 million. Kuksov and Dzektsa were sentenced to 67 months and 60 months imprisonment respectively, while police seized approximately £1.8 million in both physical funds and cryptocurrency.

A courier linked to that network, Igor Logvinov, a Lithuanian national with property in the UK and a Russian visa, was arrested by the Garda Síochána in Ireland after he was seen in July 2023 by their National Drugs and Organised Crime Bureau taking part in a cash handover at a petrol station in south Dublin. After conducting a search of the rented property in Stepaside, Dublin, where he was staying, police discovered €57,000 and several digital devices. He was sentenced to 36 months imprisonment.

Between late 2022 and mid-2023, the Russian government used the Smart network to fund espionage operations, such as the UK-based spy ring of six Bulgarian nationals led by Orlin Roussev that operated across Europe. The ring was jailed in 2025, Roussev for ten years and eight months; Bizer Dzhambazov for ten years and two months; Katrin Ivanova for nine years and eight months; Ivan Stoyanov for five years and three weeks; Vanya Gaberova for six years, eight months and three weeks; and Tihomir Ivanchev for eight years.

TGR Group also allegedly transferred funds from RT, a state-controlled international television network, to Russian-speaking journalists in the UK. In 2023, Chirkinyan was involved in transferring funds that allegedly originated from RT and was likely aimed at supporting a UK-sanctioned Russian-language media company in the UK.

Two groups were stopped in March 2023; Andrejs Jasins, a Latvian national who had travelled to the UK a day prior to his arrest, was stopped at Frankley services on the southbound M5 while driving a Ford Transit. He informed police that there was money stored in a storage area beneath the front passenger seat. Upon searching it, police discovered that he had been transporting £357,730.95 stored in three bags. He pleaded guilty in August 2023 and was sentenced to two years imprisonment. Ruslan Kaziuk was stopped at Dover by UK Border Force when he tried to leave the UK in a van registered in Ukraine. Although he declared that he was travelling with £500, upon searching his van they found £2.1 million in taped-up packages of money in the door of the van, three cardboard boxes and two shopping bags; HM Revenue and Customs later stated that more than half of the seized money was in Scottish notes. He pleaded guilty to money laundering in September 2023 and was sentenced to 68 months imprisonment.

Another group was discovered on 28 June 2023, when police stopped a vehicle with two occupants, an unnamed individual and Valeriy Popovych, in Twickenham. Upon searching the vehicle, police discovered over £60,000 in cash and Popovych was arrested. Police later searched his home and discovered a further £130,000. Popovych owned an export business, Sprint Commercial Ltd, which bought vehicles from the UK and sold them to Ukraine. Upon investigation, his wife, Oksana Popovych, who also worked at the business, was discovered to be linked to another man, Vitaliy Lutsak. He acted as a coordinator for Valeriy and Oksana, sending the pair to collect cash from criminals to be laundered, after which vehicles would be bought using said money before being transferred to Ukraine, where money was converted into cryptocurrency. Oksana and Lutsak were arrested on 15 May 2024, with a search of Lutsak's computer finding $14 million in cryptocurrency had passed through his cryptowallets; an Excel spreadsheet found during the investigation showed that over £6 million was laundered by the group between August 2022 and June 2023. A further connection was made to Kuksov, who controlled a part of the laundered money. All of them were found guilty of transferring criminal property and running an unregistered money service on 5 March 2025, with Valeriy Popovych and Lutsak being sentenced on 7 April that year to six years and six months imprisonment. Oksana was sentenced to 150 hours of community service and given a two year suspended sentence on 30 May 2025.

Due to the investigation, between late 2022 and early 2023, members of the networks became wary of operating in the UK and in London. By mid-2024, the networks were charging higher commissions for the perceived difficulty of working in London following arrests and the rising risk of money laundering.

A press release from the US Department of the Treasury on Ekaterina Zhdanova being sanctioned, 3 November 2023

Zhdanova relies on multiple methods of value transfer to move funds internationally. This includes the use of cash and leveraging connections to other international money laundering associates and organizations. Zhdanova also uses traditional businesses to maintain access to the international financial system, including through a luxury watch company that has offices around the world.

Zhdanova was sanctioned by the OFAC in November 2023 for money laundering on behalf of unnamed "Russian elites". According to the OFAC, in March 2022 she assisted a Russian client in transferring $2.3 million to Western Europe through an investment account and property purchases. In another instance, a Russian oligarch asked Zhdanova to transfer over $100 million on their behalf to the UAE. She had also provided UAE tax residency, a UAE identity card and a bank account to Russians. Payments were allegedly made to bank accounts in Dubai using cryptocurrency, which would then be transferred upon request from a client.

On 20 May 2024, a Mercedes Sprinter registered in Ukraine was stopped while trying to travel through the Channel Tunnel. The occupants of the vehicle were Taras Hirnyak and Andrii Trachuk, both Ukrainian nationals. Hirnyak claimed that they were taking items to Ukraine to support the war effort, however when police searched the vehicle they discovered multiple washing powder boxes which contained approximately £1 million in total. Both men were arrested and investigated by the NCA, and later pleaded guilty, being sentenced to 24 months imprisonment each.

Outside the NCA, Operation Destabilise involved agencies across the globe including the UK Border Force, Metropolitan Police Service, Police Scotland, States of Jersey Police, HM Revenue and Customs, the OFAC, the Drug Enforcement Administration, the Federal Bureau of Investigation, the Financial Crimes Enforcement Network, United States Secret Service, the Central Directorate of the Judicial Police (DCPJ), the National Bureau of Investigation, the National Police Corps, unnamed Spanish policing partners and the Garda Síochána. The NCA also collaborated with authorities in the UAE to disrupt money laundering operations.

== Aftermath ==
Rob Jones, the Director General of Operations at the NCA, described the operation as "the most significant money laundering operation that the NCA has undertaken in 10 years." and that it had "exposed billion-dollar money laundering networks operating in a way previously unknown to international law enforcement". Asked whether the operation had ended the money laundering ring, Jones said "Of course, there is always somebody in the wings. We really understand this system now. As people fill this void we'll get after them."

The NCA's strategic operational lead for the investigation, speaking to The Record anonymously, said of the investigation "It's probably the first time that in my time we've seen the interconnection between global impacts and money laundering at the highest possible level, and its interconnection to street level organized crime, traditional organized crime, whether it be guns, drugs, whatever, and evolving in a new methodology of money exchanges, which is clearly changing. It's probably the first time in 34 years I've seen such a variance of interconnection."

As of 4 December 2024, 84 people have been arrested, as a result of the investigation, 71 of which were in the UK, while several more have received sanctions; the majority of those arrested were couriers. It was also revealed that approximately £20 million has been seized out of an estimated £700 million in drugs sales. Magomedov, Krasnov, Rossi, Chirkinyan and Bradens have all been sanctioned by the OFAC, while Zhdanova was, as of 4 December, held in pre-trial detention in France for separate financial crimes. A seventh individual linked to one of the networks was arrested by an international associate of the NCA as a facilitator of money laundering.

Siam Expert Trading Company Ltd., a company based in Thailand and associated with Bradens, had previously facilitated the export of electronic components to Tornetcom, a Russian company sanctioned by the US that provides the Russian government with, among other things, data processing systems. Siam was subsequently sanctioned by the OFAC on 4 December 2024.

=== Further developments ===
==== Andrejs Bradens ====
The Financial Times revealed that Andrejs Bradens also owned a Turkish company, Altair Lojistik Ve Ticaret. In March 2024, said company was awarded a $23.4 million contract to supply Ukrhydroenergo with various lengths of 330kv and 150kv copper cables and associated equipment for a section of underground protection against Russian airstrikes for the Dnieper Hydroelectric Station. Ukrhydroenergo confirmed that the contract existed, that the project "is being fulfilled in accordance with the terms specified in the contract" and that all work is expected to be completed by the end of 2024.

Ukrhydroenergo stated that Bradens was not sanctioned during the preparation of the contract, and that "a thorough check of counterparties for links with [Russia]" was performed, though they said that they had "begun conducting additional checks, based on the results of which measures will be taken in accordance with the current contract and the legislation of Ukraine".

==== Semen Kuksov ====
Kuksov and his father gained Maltese citizenship in 2022 under the Citizenship by Investment Program, a scheme started in 2014 which allowed non-citizens to apply for Maltese citizenship by investing in Malta and contributing to its national development fund while living in Malta and passing background checks. In the first year after its formation, 54% of applicants were Russian. Known as a "golden passport scheme", as of 2024 it was the last in the European Union after Cyprus and Bulgaria ended their schemes in 2020 and 2022 respectively. The Maltese program and those globally have been criticized for allowing organised criminals, money launderers and tax evaders to easily gain citizenship.

Kuksov and his father received their citizenship "weeks" before Russians were excluded from the scheme after the Russian invasion of Ukraine. These passports can be revoked if, within seven years of receiving citizenship, a citizen is sentenced to a year or longer in prison. The Community Malta Agency, the organisation which oversees the scheme, began reviewing Kuksov's citizenship and; on 15 December 2024, it was announced that proceedings had begun to revoke his citizenship, with his citizenship being formally revoked in October 2025.

==== Second phase ====
The second phase of the operation refers to the period from 4 December 2024 to 21 November 2025, when the NCA released a report on their progress to that point. In this report, they revealed that they were aware the network was operating in at least 28 towns and cities across the UK, that they had arrested a further 44 people in connection with the network and that they had seized a further £5.1 million in cash. Additionally, the NCA revealed that they had assisted international partners in seizing $24 million and over €2.6 million from the network.

Altair Holdings SA and its operations was also revealed in this report, a company owned by George Rossi that purchased a 75% stake in Keremet Bank, a bank in Kyrgyzstan, on 25 December 2024. The bank was facilitating transfers between Promsvyazbank (PSB), which has been accused by the US Department of the Treasury of being a "sanctions evasion hub". Among these transfers was money destined for the Russian arms industry.
