= Liam Byrne (Irish criminal) =

Irish criminal

- Born: 30 October 1980 (age 45); Crumlin, Dublin, Ireland
- Allegiance: Kinahan Organised Crime Group; Byrne Organised Crime Group

Liam Byrne (born 30 October 1980) is an Irish criminal and member of the Byrne Organised Crime Group and the Kinahan Organised Crime Group founded by Christy Kinahan.

== Family ==
His parents are James and Sadie Byrne (née Roe). He is the second youngest of six siblings. He has a sister Maria and his youngest sibling was David Byrne who was shot dead in February 2016 as part of the Hutch–Kinahan feud. He is a brother-in-law of Thomas Kavanagh. He is a cousin of Freddie Thompson, who has been convicted of murder.

He is married to his wife Simoan McEnroe and has two children. In January 2025, Liam Byrne's son, Lee Byrne, and his girlfriend Lily James Gerrard, the daughter of Steven Gerrard, former Liverpool and England footballer, shared the news that they were expecting their first child.

== Early criminal career ==
Byrne became known to Gardaí as a street dealer of cannabis and later ecstasy. Christy Kinahan supplied them with the drugs. Kinahan is from St Theresa's Gardens, not far from the part of Crumlin where Byrne lived. When Byrne was in his early teens, Kinahan was in his late 30s and based in both Dublin and Tamworth.

Kinahan was the first leader of the gang.

Christy Kinahan was arrested and jailed in Dublin in 1997 after being linked to a batch of stolen cheques. Leadership of the gang passed to Freddie Thompson and Byrne and his associates started sourcing their drugs from elsewhere.

== Convictions ==
He has a conviction for armed robbery and one for assault. Both crimes were committed when he was a teenager.

=== Armed robbery ===
Byrne and his close friend Liam Greenhalgh, the former Ireland under-16 football captain, carried out armed robberies on two shops in Dublin's south inner city in July 1998. During the second robbery, an off-duty Garda walked into the shop.

Liam pleaded guilty to burglary, dangerous driving and firearms charges. In January 2000 he was found guilty and given a suspended sentence of four years.

=== Assault of Trevor Donnelly ===
On 23 April 2000, Trevor Donnelly and his partner Jennifer Doyle were involved in a row with three women in the Abrakebabra in the Crumlin Shopping Centre. The women followed them from the takeaway, hitting them as a security guard intervened. Byrne arrived in his car and began beating Donnelly with a baseball bat, hitting him even as he lay on the ground. When Jennifer pleaded with him to stop, Liam said "Tell him if he wakes up it's bullets."

About fifty people witnessed the assault, but only Doyle and Donnelly were willing to testify. Most were too afraid of Byrne and his gang to testify.

==== Sentence activated ====
When he was brought before the court his suspended sentence was activated and he was jailed for the first time on 23 May 2000.

==== Witness intimidation ====
Byrne tried to intimidate Doyle on several occasions. First he offered €50,000 to her to not testify, with a threat to kill her if she testified. She refused to take the bribe.

Further threats forced her to leave her home after it was shot at. There was a plot to murder her - an INLA gunman was asked to kill her to prevent her testimony.

She lived in B&Bs and hotel accommodation under an alias and was virtually penniless. She was not included in a witness protection programme.

After she testified she was badly injured in an assault in the corridors of the Four Courts.

Her testimony was a major factor in Byrne's conviction and two years were added to the four-year sentence which after remission amounted to four and a half years. The sentences were initially to run concurrently but the Court of Appeals decided they should run consecutively.

== Crumlin-Drimnagh feud ==
Two months before Byrne was first jailed, three members of the gang Byrne was involved with were arrested at the Holiday Inn in Pearse street.

Two of them were charged, but the third, Declan Gavin, was released without charge. A bitter row ensued over whether Gavin had informed on the others. Gavin was a close friend of Byrne.

The gang split into two factions: one headed by Brian Rattigan and one headed by Freddie Thompson and Declan Gavin. After Byrne was jailed, the dispute turned violent.

In March 2001 Christy Kinahan was released from prison. He wanted to avoid the Criminal Assets Bureau, the feud and to be closer to the European cocaine wholesale market. He moved to Spain a few months later.

Within weeks of Kinahan's departure Brian Rattigan had fatally stabbed Declan Gavin. The feud would lead to 13 fatalities and last a decade.

Byrne was eventually released from jail in November 2004.

== Byrne Organised Crime Group ==
He is the current head of the Byrne organised crime group, which is a branch of the Kinahan gang founded by Christy Kinahan. It was then led by Freddie Thompson, then by Liam.

After his release from prison he and Thompson frequently visited Kinahan in southern Spain. Kinahan supplied them with drugs and they oversaw the distribution and debt collection with help from Kinahan contacts.

During 2007–2008 Freddie Thompson got involved with a feud with the INLA. He fled Dublin for several periods, leaving Byrne to assume control of the gang.

In 2013 he set up LS Active Car Sales in the Bluebell Industrial Estate. The business did not act as a car sales business but the cars were for the exclusive use of the gang and their families. By the time the business was raided by the Criminal Assets Bureau it had not sold a single car.

Gardaí watched and frequently stopped members of the gang, particularly Liam Byrne and Sean Gerard McGovern.

The High Court found that the Byrne Organised Crime Group did not operate legitimate businesses and were acting as a front for laundering money earned from crime. This operated through used car dealerships and other businesses in Ireland and the United Kingdom.

Cars and motorbikes were also used as currency between organised crime groups.

=== Houses ===
In September 2000 senior member of the gang Liam Roe bought a house on Grangeview Road, Clondalkin for €119,000. Liam then bought the house off Liam Roe for €270,000 with a thirty-year mortgage of €150,000. It is not clear where the €120,000 came from.

He claimed in 2006 that he was a spray painter who had a garage in Lucan and earned €530 a week with a €5,000 bonus. This did not tally with his tax returns which showed he only earned €10,827 and paid only €245.51. He was also able to make mortgage payments of €697.22 per month on a house in Clondalkin while paying €850 a month rent on the house in Raleigh Square.

=== Mule State Foundation ===
In July 2016 there was €110,087.03 left on his mortgage and he was paying back €2,000 each month. His sister Maria was withdrawing €2,000 on the same date but didn't make a claim on the Clondalkin property in the High Court.

The Criminal Assets Bureau discovered that Maria got the money when she sold a house in Ashbourne to sister Melanie Johnson. €400,080 of that money was lodged to Maria's account between November 2007 and March 2010 and €49,800 was then lodged from her account to Liam's. The High Court declared the Grangeview Road house to be the proceeds of crime.

Sean McGovern bought a house on Kildare Road in Crumlin valued at €270,000 in March 2015. It was extensively renovated for over €247,000. He lived there with his partner, Anita Freeman, who the CAB discovered was receiving local rent authority payments and then paying them into Liam's account.

CAB also discovered that €150,000 of the money used to buy the house came from an Investec bank account in Mauritius. The money was described as "a loan for the purchase of real estate in Ireland" coming from "Mule State Foundation" c/o Grand Baie Trust Company but the CAB count not find evidence of a loan agreement, a repayment structure or any repayments of the purported loan.

The Bureau determined that the house was bought for €155,000 - €150,000 from the Mule State Foundation and €20,000 from the car businesses that had been lodged to McGovern's account. Forensic analysis of McGovern and Freeman's means could not determine the source of the money used for the renovations. McGovern's house was declared to be the proceeds of crime.

The houses at Grangeview Road, Clondalkin and at Kildare Road, Crumlin were broken into and vandalised shortly before they were to be handed over. The CAB applied to the High Court to ask Maria Byrne to promise that the Raleigh Square house would be handed over intact. In October 2020 a 28-year-old man was charged with the arson attack in Grangeview Road.

=== Mule State Foundation, drug smuggling and VAT fraud ===
The CAB asked the National Crime Agency in the United Kingdom and they replied with information about two conspiracy investigations into drug smuggling from mainland Europe into Ireland and the UK.

The first investigation, into industrial metal rollers that contained cocaine, cannabis and mixing agent led to the conviction of James Mulvey and Barry Kenneth Phibbs. Mulvey was one of the Kinahan gang's main dealers in the UK. Police discovered that the Mule State Foundation was established "for the educational benefit and wellbeing of the Mulvey family".

The second investigation, into VAT fraud and money laundering, involved charging VAT on invoices that was never paid to UK Revenue. The money was paid either via cash or to people operating under false names. This disguised that the money was going to the Byrne Organised Crime Gang. Between June 2014 and April 2015 £353,000 was paid to the Mule State Foundation.

On 26 February 2016, two of the Foundation's three council members signed a resolution: "It is noted that the Board of the Foundation have taken a decision to write off the loan of €150,000 provided to Mr Sean Gerard McGovern due to his recent demise". In fact, Sean McGovern had survived the Regency Hotel attack.

== Dublin home ==
He lived in a house that was owned by his sister but lived in by himself, his partner and children. The house in Raleigh Square, Crumlin was confiscated by the Criminal Assets Bureau in March 2019. Maria turned over the house along with €27,000 in a bank account.

== Move to UK ==
The High Court gave the Byrnes four months to leave the Raleigh Square house and Liam had already left it for the UK by 3 September 2019.

== Car dealership ==
Like his brother-in-law he runs a luxury car dealership in the UK.

== Encrochat ==
Police action against the EncroChat communications network resulted in messages relating to the Byrne organised crime gang being intercepted. Although Liam Byrne himself is not suspected of using Encrochat, the National Crime Agency has intercepted messages they believe were associated with his business operations in Birmingham and Liverpool.

== August 2020 attack on Clondalkin house ==
In the early hours of 12 August 2020 the house on Grange View Road, Clondalkin that CAB had seized from Liam Byrne was attacked by a car that deliberately reversed into the downstairs living room and then petrol bombed. Four fire engines and an ambulance from Tallaght fire station were called after reports of a jeep crashing into the house. Nobody was injured and the fire was prevented from spreading to adjacent properties. The house had been valued at €320,000 before this arson attack and was about to go on the market.

== Arrest in Spain ==
On 4 June 2023, Byrne was arrested in the Alcúdia area of Majorca. He had travelled to Majorca from Dubai to meet family. He was arrested on the basis of a UK extradition warrant.

The Spanish police said that Byrne's criminal group had bought firearms to sell to other criminal organisations. The investigation was led by the National Crime Agency and supported by the Garda Síochána and the Spanish National Police. After the investigation finished, Byrne fled to Dubai.

In December 2023 he was extradited to the UK. The arrest warrants were obtained as a result of EncroChat messages.

In October 2024 he was sentenced to five years in prison in connection with a plot to stockpile guns and ammunition so his brother-in-law Thomas Kavanagh could get a lighter sentence. Thomas Kavanagh was sentenced to six years to be served concurrently with a 21-year sentence.

== See also ==
- Hutch–Kinahan feud
