= Kinahan Organised Crime Group =

Irish criminal organisation

- 2022 wanted posters of Christy and Christopher Jr. Kinahan by the Drug Enforcement Administration (DEA)
- Founded: 1990s
- Founded by: Christopher Vincent Kinahan, Sr.
- Founding location: Dublin, Ireland
- Years active: 1990s–present
- Territory: Ireland, United Kingdom, Spain, United Arab Emirates
- Criminal activities: Drug trafficking, money laundering, murder, arms trafficking, extortion, blackmailing
- Allies: Lyons Crime Family; Moroccan mafia; Tito and Dino Cartel; 'Ndrangheta; Liverpool mafia; Camorra; Hezbollah; Sinaloa Cartel; Clan del Golfo; Chinese mafia; Chosen Few Motorcycle Club; Hells Angels MC
- Rivals: Hutch gang; New IRA; Real IRA; Grendon Crime Family (a.k.a. The Family)

The Kinahan Organised Crime Group (KOCG), also known as the Kinahan Cartel, is a major Irish transnational organised crime syndicate alleged to be the most powerful in Ireland and one of the largest organised crime groups in the world. It is also established in the UK, Spain, and the United Arab Emirates. It was founded by Christy Kinahan in the 1990s. Estimated reports have credited them with wealth of up to €1 billion.

The Kinahan Cartel has had an ongoing feud with the Hutch Gang since 2015, which had resulted in 18 deaths by August 2021.

The organization was led by Christy's oldest son, Daniel Kinahan, until he was arrested in Dubai on 15 April 2026 after the conclusion of a secret operation between UAE and Irish police.

== Background ==
The Kinahan Organised Crime Group was founded by Christy Kinahan, a native Dubliner, in the late 1990s and early 2000s during Ireland's "Celtic Tiger" period of rapid economic growth. Kinahan's first convictions date back to the late 1970s and involved house breaking, car theft, burglary, handling stolen goods and forgery. The group reportedly began as a street gang of inner-city drug dealers in Dublin, but soon grew on a global scale to become the multi-million dollar criminal network that it is today. Christy Kinahan served as the direct leader of the organisation up until the position was passed on to his son Daniel Kinahan. Irish courts have subsequently concluded that the group is a murderous organisation involved in the international trafficking of drugs and firearms.

On 12 April 2022, the United States Department of State announced the offering of rewards of up to US$5 million under the Narcotics Rewards Program for information leading to the arrest and/or conviction of Kinahan family members. The reward is offered jointly with the Garda Síochána, National Crime Agency, and Drug Enforcement Administration. The seven key members were named as: Daniel Kinahan; Christopher Kinahan; Christopher Kinahan Jnr; veteran Dublin-born criminal Bernard Clancy; Daniel Kinahan’s “advisor and closest confidant" Sean McGovern; former KOCG enforcer now Marbella-based money launderer "Johnny Cash" Morrissey; and Ian Dixon who was arrested over the 2015 Costa del Sol murder of Gary Hutch but never charged.

Despite the sanctions being imposed on the group, it was reported in August 2022 that Spanish-based associates of the Kinahan cartel were continuing to operate multi-million-euro drug shipments. "Johnny Cash" Morrissey and his wife Nicola were arrested in Marbella, Spain on Monday 13 September 2022.

In February 2023, a raid on a business in the Long Mile Road area of Dublin led to the seizure of equipment, the arrest of eight people and 40 kg of cocaine. Over 2,000 containers of nitric oxide were seized, as well as €78,000 in cash, a hydraulic drugs press, communications devices, mixing agent and a money counter. Two of those arrested were later released.

Edin Gačanin, who is involved in organised crime in Bosnia and Herzegovina, was sanctioned in 2023 by the US, which cited "close links" to Daniel Kinahan after broken encrypted chats showed how the Kinahan cartel was involved in a €350m coke plot. The US named Daniel Kinahan, his father Christy Kinahan Snr and Christy Kinahan Jnr as the three key players of the Kinahan gang.

The Kinahan cartel had been living openly and running their operations from Dubai, enjoying the immunity that the city offers to organised crime groups. The cartel maintains ties with the authorities, along with financial links with powerful Dubai families. Multiple companies were set by the group in Dubai to offer business services and to trade textiles, clothing and food. An investigation revealed that the businesses were being used to supply drugs, including cocaine, heroin, and others, and to launder dirty money. Despite keeping a low profile, they ran the business as usual in Dubai. A number of meetings are held by the Kinahan family with their criminal associates in Dubai. In October 2024, Sean Gerard McGovern was arrested by the Interpol notice in Dubai. Fearing McGovern's extradition to Ireland, the cartel laid out a detailed plan to move out from Dubai to Russia. On 21 October, Ireland signed an extradition treaty with the UAE. On 29 May 2025, McGovern was extradited from the UAE to Ireland and was subsequently arrested and charged with murder.

They laundered money via the Smart and TGR networks.

Authorities believe that the Kinahan cartel coordinated with Hezbollah in a failed attempt to smuggle 2.2 tons of cocaine from Venezuela to Ireland in September 2023. The seizure of the cocaine was the largest in Irish history.

== Kinahan family and associates ==
A chart of persons the US Office of Foreign Assets Control designates for sanctions, 2022

The Kinahan crime family is primarily involved in the drug trade.

- Christy Kinahan – Also known as "the Dapper Don", Christopher Vincent Kinahan, Sr. is the founder of the Kinahan crime group. He has served prison sentences in Ireland, The Netherlands and Belgium, including six years for dealing heroin, 2 1/2 years for possession of cocaine, and four years for money laundering.
- Daniel Kinahan – Christy's eldest son, is suspected of managing the day-to-day operations of the family's criminal empire. A boxing promoter, Daniel has worked as an advisor for Tyson Fury.
- Christopher Kinahan (Christy Jnr) – younger son of Christy Kinahan, is wanted by the US Department of State, which offers a reward of up to US$5 million for information leading to his arrest or conviction for participating in transnational organised crime, namely narcotics trafficking and money laundering.
- Imre "The Butcher" Arakas – An Estonian hitman, he is known for committing murders in several European countries, including Estonia, Lithuania, Spain and Ireland, in addition to having killed dozens of members of the Russian Mafia.
- Declan "Mr Nobody" Brady – One of Daniel Kinahan's closest associates, he holds some of the most important positions within the gang: he is the main logistics man and quartermaster of the Kinahans, being primarily responsible for the gang's weapons depot and for their safety as a result.
- Ross Browning - A native of Dublin, he is one of the Kinahan family's top lieutenants. Considered Daniel Kinahan's right-hand man, he has been responsible for the operations of the Kinahan crime syndicate in Ireland for over two decades and has become a priority target for the Gardaí and the CAB due to his proximity to Daniel Kinahan.
- Liam Byrne – A Dublin gangster, he is a high-ranking member of the Kinahan Family. He comes from a criminal family led by his father James Byrne, who was an associate of Irish gangster Martin "The General" Cahill, and is the older brother of David Byrne, an associate of the Kinahan Family who was murdered on 5 February 2016 at the Regency Hotel in Whitehall, Dublin.
- Trevor Byrne - sentenced in 2021 to 17.5 years in prison for firearms offences and robbery, and suspected of being a gunman in the murder of Eddie Hutch.
- Lee Canavan - convicted of the 2016 murder of David Douglas along with Freddie Thompson, and given a mandatory life sentence. Canavan’s half-brother Gareth Brophy and Nathan Foley were convicted of being involved and given 9.5 years and 6 years in prison.
- Bernard Patrick Clancy – A childhood friend of Daniel Kinahan. He was previously jailed for drugs offences on the Costa del Sol, Spain. Sanctioned by OFAC.
- Ian Thomas Dixon – He has arranged multiple payments on behalf of Daniel Kinahan, as well as moved bulk currency in Ireland and the United Kingdom.
- Douglas Glynn - A footsoldier jailed for 8 years in 2023 for managing a drugs warehouse containing €1.4m-worth of drugs. Glynn was imprisoned for 6.5 years in 2022 for involvement in the foiled plot to murder James 'Mago' Gately.
- Jamie Griffin – A footsoldier for the gang, he is the younger brother of Leon Griffin. Pleaded guilty to a violent assault in December 2012.
- Leon Griffin – A footsoldier for the gang, he is a friend of Freddie Thompson and is known to be one of the most brutal and volatile criminals not only in the Kinahan family, but in all of Dublin. Jailed for 3 years after a high speed chase through Dublin in 2019. On 20 June 2022 Griffin was given a further eight-year sentence for armed robbery of a security van, and a concurrent seven-year sentence for weapons possession.
- Gerard "Hatchet" Kavanagh – He was believed to have worked as a debt collector and enforcer for the Kinahans. He was shot dead, aged 44, on 5 September 2014 in Elivira, Marbella, Spain. He had been heavily involved in the drug trade for over 20 years.
- Thomas "Bomber" Kavanagh – The second-in-command of the Kinahan family, he is considered by many to be Ireland's most feared mobster and is considered the main name of the Kinahan family in the United Kingdom. He is known to be brutal and violent, being responsible for at least seven murders. He is the head of the UK branch of the Kinahan gang. Sentenced in England in 2022 to 21 years' imprisonment.
- Jonathan Keogh was convicted in November 2018 along with his sister Regina Keogh and Thomas Fox of the murder of Gareth Hutch. All three were sentenced to life imprisonment.
- Gerard Mackin - reportedly a Kinahan "enforcer", was extradited from Spain in 2022 and pleaded guilty to money laundering. Mackin had previously been tried twice for the murder in 2007 of Edward Burns, a taxi driver, in Belfast. Convicted at the first trial, a retrial collapsed when witnesses refused to testify. He had also been convicted in 2017, for a "depraved and barbaric" assault where a man was nailed to a kitchen floor with a nail-gun.
- Sean Gerard McGovern – Daniel Kinahan's advisor and closest confidant. He has managed communications on behalf of Daniel Kinahan and sells multi-kilogram quantities of cocaine.
- John Francis "Johnny Cash" Morrissey – Manchester, England-born former Cork restaurateur, Morrissey worked as an enforcer before fleeing Ireland in the early 2000s after reportedly being involved in a bid to harm an Irish Criminal Assets Bureau officer. Based in Marbella, Spain ever since, Morrissey allegedly became the KOCG drugs shipping organiser and money launderer. On 13 September 2022, a combined force of six enforcement agencies led by the Spanish Civil Guard's elite Central Operative Unit, arrested Morrissey at his villa in Marbella, the first of seven men named by the United States' Office of Foreign Assets Control (OFAC) in April 2022 to be arrested. Morrissey had gained notoriety for being part of the team publicising his wife Nicola's Scottish-based Nero Drinks Company Ltd, which was thought to be part of Morrissey's €200 million annual money-laundering operation, leading to her arrest at the same time as him.
- Ciaran O'Driscoll – A footsoldier for the gang, he has a criminal record that ranges from possession of illegal drugs to attempted murder. Jailed for 11.5 years in 2017.
- Paul Rice – A high-ranking member of the Kinahan family, he is known for being extremely violent, and is consequently considered a high-value target by other gangs.
- Freddie Thompson – A cousin of Liam Byrne, he was the head of the Dublin branch of the Kinahan gang from 1997 to 2008, when he had to leave Ireland over a feud with the Irish National Liberation Army (INLA). He is currently serving a life sentence for the murder of David Douglas.
- Liam Roe - A cousin of Freddie Thompson and Liam Byrne and a senior lieutenant in the Kinahan gang. He died in August 2024 aged 45.
- Graham "the wig" Whelan - a drug dealer and money launderer in the Kinahan gang.
- Glen Ward - Nicknamed "Mr Flashy" by media sources, Ward is believed to lead an offshoot of the Kinahan gang in Finglas.
- Lyons Crime Family – An organised crime family based in Glasgow, Scotland that has been involved in various criminal activities over the years, including drug trafficking, extortion, and violence. Their activities have attracted significant media attention and law enforcement scrutiny. Current leader Steven Lyons (son of the group's founder Eddie Lyons Snr) is believed to have connections with the Kinahan Group.
