= James Byrne (Irish criminal) =

Irish fraudster (1947 or 1948 – 2024)

- Born: 1947 or 1948
- Died: 7 September 2024 (aged 76); Dublin, Ireland
- Other names: Jemmy, Jaws
- Criminal charges: Fraud; counterfeiting

James Byrne (1947 or 1948 – 7 September 2024), also known as Jemmy or Jaws, was an Irish criminal. He was once an associate of Martin Cahill.

== Criminal history ==
Byrne had a history of fraud and counterfeiting.

In November 2002, he agreed to repay €43,353 in unemployment assistance that he was not entitled to. He paid the Revenue Commissioners €208,400 after Revenue and the Criminal Assets Bureau issued his wife and him with a tax assessment of €378,612 in 2004. Some of the assessment was paid from €22,000 in cash seized at his home in 2001.

He had been a friend of Gerard Hutch and was photographed with him in Lanzarote in 2014. After the fatal shooting of his son David he and Hutch fell out.

As a result of the Kinahan-Hutch feud, Gerard Hutch met with Jonathan Dowdall and the New IRA with a view to the latter group acting as mediators between the two gangs. Hutch told Dowdall that Byrne would need to be consulted and "on board" before a ceasefire could be negotiated.

In 2018 High Court found that Byrne, his wife, his daughter Maria and three others "while not members of the Byrne organised crime group, are closely related to its members and involved in money laundering" and "They also have access to the proceeds of criminal activity carried out by the Byrne organised crime group".

Both Byrne and his wife attended the trials of Gerard Hutch and Jonathan Dowdall for the shooting of David Byrne. The Special Criminal Court found Hutch not guilty and the Dowdall trial collapsed after the death of the lead investigator.

== Personal life and death ==
Byrne was married to Sadie Roe and the father of six children, including Liam Byrne and David Byrne. His son David was shot dead in February 2016.

Byrne died on 7 September 2024, aged 76.
