= David Byrne (criminal) =

Irish criminal (1981/2-2016)

- Born: 1981/1982; Crumlin, Dublin, Ireland
- Died: 5 February 2016 (aged 34); Dublin, Ireland
- Occupation: Criminal
- Known for: Associate of Christy Kinahan's gang
- Children: 3

David Byrne (1981/1982 - 5 February 2016) was an Irish criminal associated with the Kinahan Organised Crime Group run by Christy Kinahan. His parents were James and Sadie Byrne (née Roe). He was from Raleigh Square in Crumlin.

He was a first cousin of Freddie Thompson. His brother Liam is also involved in crime.

Both Byrne and associate Graham "the wig" Whelan were questioned over the murder of Gary Bryan in 2006, but no charges were brought.

He was the father of one daughter and two sons.

== Criminal history ==
He had been investigated by every Garda specialist unit since he was a teenager.

In June 2002 he was the target of a gun attack in south inner-city Dublin, but he escaped without injury.

He was present at the fatal stabbing of Declan Gavin in August 2001 in Crumlin, Dublin. He was called as a witness in the trial of Brian Rattigan for the killing but said he had seen nothing.

David Byrne had been arrested many times and was a suspect in the murder of Gary Bryan in Walkinstown in 2006.

In January 2016, Gardaí had a special policing plan put in place for the following month when two boxing events would be attended by members of a criminal gang associated with Christy Kinahan. The Kinahan gang have a long association with boxing both in Dublin and Marbella.

== Death ==
He was shot dead in an armed attack at a weigh-in for a boxing event at the Regency Hotel in Dublin. His brother Liam was one of the pallbearers at the funeral.
