= Freddie Thompson (Irish criminal) =

Irish criminal (born 1980)

- Born: Frederick James Thompson; December 16, 1980 (age 45); Dublin, Ireland
- Other name: "Fat Freddie"
- Organization: Kinahan Organised Crime Group
- Relatives: Liam Byrne (cousin); David Byrne (cousin)
- Criminal charges: Spain: Unlawful assembly (2011); Drug offences (2011); Possession of weapons (2011); Arms trafficking (2011); Ireland: Violent disorder (2015); Murder (2018)
- Penalty: 20 months (2015); Life imprisonment (2018)

Details
- Victims: David Douglas
- Imprisoned at: Portlaoise Prison

Frederick James Thompson, sometimes called "Fat Freddie" (born 16 December 1980) is an Irish criminal. Formerly a leader of a faction in the Crumlin-Drimnagh feud, he is currently serving life in prison for the murder of David Douglas.

== Early life ==
Frederick James Thompson was born on 16 December 1980. One of four children born to Christine, his father left the family when he was young. He grew up on Loreto Road in the Maryland area of south-inner city Dublin. Aside from a period working as a butcher's apprentice at the age of sixteen, Thompson has never held legitimate employment. He first came to the attention of the Garda Síochána in his at the age of thirteen for car theft and related offences.

He is a cousin of Liam Byrne whose brother David was shot in February 2016.

== Criminal activities ==
Thompson assumed control of the Dublin branch of the Kinahan gang after Christy Kinahan was jailed in 1997 in relation to stolen cheques. In 2000, three members of the gang were arrested in the Holiday Inn on Pearse Street; while two were charged, Declan Gavin was released from custody without charge as he was not physically holding the drugs. Gavin's release led to him being labelled a "rat" by some gang members, splitting the gang into two factions; an anti-Gavin faction led by Brian Rattigan and a faction supportive of Gavin led by Thompson.

In August 2001, Gavin was stabbed dead outside an Abrakebabra restaurant in Crumlin. This murder kicked off the Crumlin–Drimnagh feud, which went on throughout the 2000s. A number of Thompson's associates, including Gavin Byrne, Darren Geoghegan and Paul Warren were killed during this feud. Thompson fled Ireland for the Netherlands in 2005 amidst these murders. In 2006, Thompson was arrested and charged with possession of seven kilograms of cocaine and six handguns, but was acquitted of the charge in 2007.

During 2007-2008 he was involved with a feud with the INLA, including Declan Duffy, which caused him to flee Dublin several times. Because of this, Liam Byrne gradually assumed control of the Dublin branch of the gang.

In 2008, he was travelling in a four-wheel drive car in Spain with Paddy Doyle and Gary Hutch, a nephew of Gerry Hutch when they were ambushed and Doyle was shot dead. (Gary Hutch was shot at the start of the Hutch–Kinahan feud.)

=== Extradition to Spain ===
Thompson was extradited to Spain in 2011 after Spanish authorities linked him to an organisation based in the Costa del Sol, namely the Kinahan gang. He was allowed to return to Ireland in 2013. He was wanted in Spain on three charges - unlawful assembly, drugs offences, possession of weapons and arms trafficking. Spanish authorities claimed that he procured weapons for the organisation and is a bodyguard and chauffeur.

Thompson submitted a statement of means claiming he had no income. Counsel for the state asked how Thompson could support himself when he did not claim welfare, was not registered for business or tax yet travelled around Europe. Thompson claimed he was supported by his mother. The judge found the statement of means very unsatisfactory and refused free legal aid. Ultimately, Thompson was not convicted for any criminal offences in Spain.

=== Extradition from Netherlands ===
In May 2014, he was arrested by Dutch police on foot of an international arrest warrant. He was extradited from Amsterdam and held in custody. It was related to a brawl on 7 January 2013, at Morriseys' pub, Cork Street, "sparked by slagging" after a funeral.

In February 2015, he pleaded guilty to violent disorder for which he was jailed. At the time of the Garda investigation Thompson had 29 previous convictions. Judge Martin Nolan said that Thompson had probably caused the brawl and that he had thrown a bottle at someone. He also described the brawl as "a quite serious fracas" in which many people were involved. Thompson pleaded guilty and his sentence was backdated to 23 May 2014, the date he was first remanded.

=== Murder of David Douglas ===
In July 2016, David Douglas was murdered and Thompson was charged with the murder that November. In August 2018, Thompson was convicted of the murder. He is imprisoned in Portlaoise Prison, though spent several months in Cork Prison after attacking prison staff in Portlaoise.

== See also ==
- Graham "the wig" Whelan, who sided with Thompson during the Crumlin-Drimnagh feud.
- Liam Byrne, cousin of Thompson.
- David Byrne, cousin of Thompson killed in the Regency Hotel shooting.
