= National Crime Agency =

National law enforcement agency in the United Kingdom

- Logo

- Badge
- Abbreviation: NCA

Agency overview
- Formed: 7 October 2013
- Preceding agencies: National Policing Improvement Agency; Police Central e-Crime Unit; Serious Organised Crime Agency
- Superseding agency: National Police Service (planned)
- Annual budget: £859.9 million (2023/24)

Jurisdictional structure
- Operations jurisdiction: United Kingdom
- Jurisdiction of the National Crime Agency
- Population: 65,182,178

Operational structure
- Headquarters: 12 Endeavour Square, Stratford Cross, London E20 1HZ
- Sworn officers: 2,189
- Overall workforces: 6,264
- Elected officers responsible: Shabana Mahmood, Home Secretary; Dan Jarvis, Minister of State for Security
- Agency executives: Graeme Biggar, director general; Rob Jones, director general, operations; James Babbage, director general, Threats; Steve Rodhouse, director general, strategic projects; Claire Smith, chief operating officer
- Parent agency: Home Office
- Child agencies: Child Exploitation and Online Protection Command; National Cyber Crime Unit; National Economic Crime Centre

Website
- nationalcrimeagency.gov.uk

The National Crime Agency (NCA) is a national law enforcement agency in the United Kingdom. It is the UK's lead agency against organised crime, human and drug trafficking, weapons and cybercrime, including economic crime that goes across regional and international borders, but it can be tasked to investigate any crime.

The NCA has a strategic role as part of which it looks at serious crime in aggregate across the UK, especially analysing how organised criminals are operating and how they can be disrupted. To do this, it works closely with regional organised crime units (ROCUs), local police forces, and other government departments and agencies. It is not a police force as such, but many of its employees do have the power of a constable.

It is the UK's point of contact for foreign agencies such as Interpol, Europol and other international law enforcement agencies. On a day-to-day basis, the NCA assists police forces and other law enforcement agencies (and vice versa) under voluntary assistance arrangements. In extremis, the NCA director general has the power to direct a chief officer of a police force to give directed assistance with NCA tasks where necessary (but only with consent of the relevant Secretary of State). The NCA itself can also be directed by the Secretary of State to give directed assistance to a police force or other law enforcement agency.

It was established in 2013 as a non-ministerial government department, replacing the Serious Organised Crime Agency and absorbed the previously separate Child Exploitation and Online Protection Centre (CEOP) as one of its commands. It also assumed a number of responsibilities from other law enforcement agencies.

The NCA has also assumed a range of functions from the National Policing Improvement Agency, which has been scrapped as part of the government's changes to policing. These include a specialist database relating to injuries and unusual weapons, expert research on potential serial killers, and the National Missing Persons Bureau. The agencies going into the NCA had a combined budget of £812 million (equivalent to £1.1 billion or US$1.41 billion in 2024) yet the new agency only had £464 million in its first year—a decrease of 43%. Some of the responsibilities of the former UK Border Agency (now Immigration Enforcement and Border Force) relating to border policing also became part of the NCA. Like its predecessor SOCA, the NCA has been dubbed the "British FBI" by the media.

The director general is Graeme Biggar.

== History ==
The proposed agency was first publicly announced in a statement to the House of Commons by Theresa May, the then home secretary, on 26 July 2010. On 8 June 2011, she declared that the NCA would comprise a number of distinct operational commands: Organised Crime, Border Policing, Economic Crime and the Child Exploitation and Online Protection Centre, and that it would house the National Cyber Crime Unit. She added that capabilities, expertise, assets and intelligence would be shared across the new agency; that each command would operate as part of one single organisation; and that the NCA would be a powerful body of operational crime fighters, led by a senior chief constable and accountable to the Home Secretary. In her statement to the House of Commons, May stated that the new agency would have the authority to "undertake tasking and coordination, ensuring appropriate action is taken to put a stop to the activities of organised crime groups".

In June 2011, the coalition government announced that SOCA's operations (serious drug trafficking investigative and intelligence sections) would be merged into a larger National Crime Agency to launch in 2013.

On 23 September 2011, the Home Affairs Select Committee called for the Metropolitan Police's counterterrorism role to be given to the NCA when it became operational, saying that the terrorist threat was a "national problem" and that there would be "advantages" in transferring responsibility. The Metropolitan Police raised concerns around the cost of such a move.

The Home Affairs Select Committee met again on 9 May 2014 to discuss counterterrorism. As a part of the report, the committee reconsidered the question of moving counterterrorism responsibilities to the NCA. The committee came to the conclusion that:

The Metropolitan Police have a wide remit which has many complexities and the current difficulties faced by the organisation lead us to believe that the responsibility for counter-terrorism ought to be moved to the NCA in order to allow the Met to focus on the basics of policing London. The work to transfer the command ought to begin immediately with a view to a full transfer of responsibility for counter-terrorism operations taking place, for example within five years after the NCA became operational, in 2018. When this takes place, it should finally complete the jigsaw of the new landscape of policing.

However, the report acknowledged that the NCA was still a new agency and that at the time it was not fully operational in Northern Ireland. Questions have been raised as to how effective this model would be and, with a limited budget, whether other responsibilities would suffer and not be resourced as properly as they should be. If the whole of Counter Terrorism Command were to transfer from the Metropolitan police to the NCA, the NCA would receive a further 1,500 officers or more if other counterterrorism units transferred in as well. It raised the question of what other national police units could be absorbed into the NCA, such as the National Wildlife Crime Unit, National Domestic Extremism and Disorder Intelligence Unit, National Vehicle Crime Intelligence Service and other units with a national remit from ACPO, the Metropolitan Police and other forces. Plans are being discussed for the second time of moving the Serious Fraud Office into the NCA.

The process of looking at moving counterterrorism into the NCA was put on hold on 9 October 2014 by Home Secretary Theresa May due to an increase in the terror threat level.

In October 2011, it was announced that Keith Bristow, the then Chief Constable of Warwickshire Police, would head the organisation.

The NCA came into existence under provisions granted by the Crime and Courts Act 2013, which received Royal Assent on 25 April 2013.

Until 20 May 2015, the agency was only able to carry out border and customs functions in Northern Ireland. This was due to the fact that under the 1998 Good Friday Agreement that led to a political settlement and power-sharing in Northern Ireland, policing was subjected to a far higher degree of community oversight and monitoring than in other parts of the UK. The chief constable and officers are responsible to the Policing Board.

== Jurisdiction ==
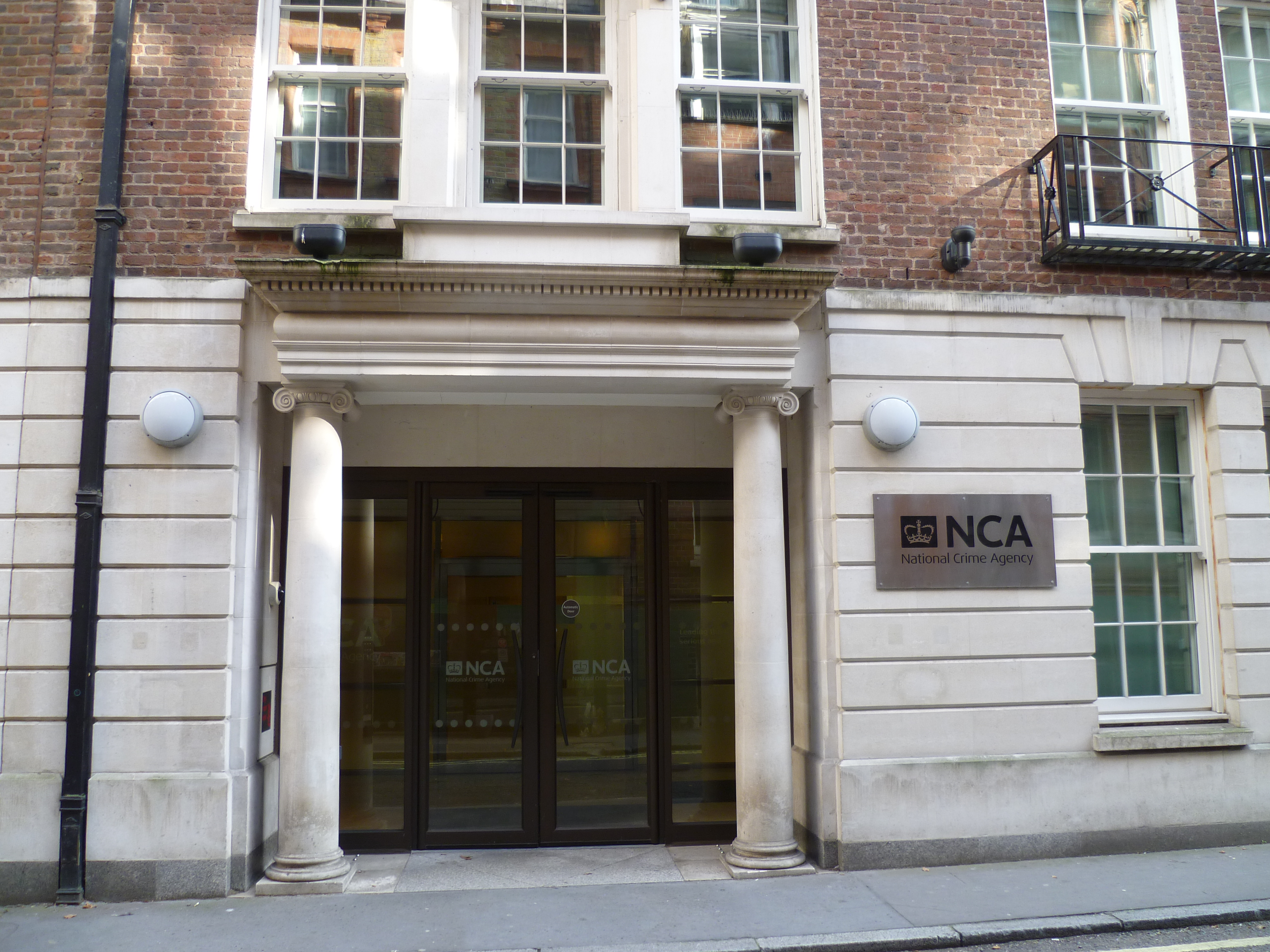
The NCA's former headquarters on Old Queen Street in London

=== Powers ===
The NCA operates across the UK, respecting the devolution of policing in Scotland and Northern Ireland.

A large number of NCA officers, including Investigators, can be designated with the powers and privileges of a police constable, immigration officer, customs officer, or a general customs officer (or any combination of the four sets of powers) under Section 10 of the Courts and Crime Act 2013. When NCA officers are designated with all three sets of powers it is known as being triple warranted, or "tri-warranted".

Although NCA officers can be designated with the above powers, they do not hold the office of constable and are civil servants. This is a different legal position from that of police officers who serve in the various police forces of the UK. The NCA is not a police force but an operationally independent non-ministerial government department.

=== Scotland ===
In Scotland, the NCA's operations and powers are limited to those inherited from its predecessor, the Serious Organised Crime Agency, and the powers to operate in Scotland are conditional on authorisation from the Lord Advocate and through co-operation with Police Scotland. Previously co-operation was with the Scottish Crime and Drug Enforcement Agency (a police force which was responsible for similar matters in Scotland).

=== Northern Ireland ===
In Northern Ireland, the NCA is "fully operational", through the passage of the Crime and Courts Act 2013 (National Crime Agency and Proceeds of Crime) (Northern Ireland) Order 2015 which extended provisions of the Crime and Courts Act 2013 to Northern Ireland. A general authorisation was signed by Minister of Justice for Northern Ireland and the director general granted trained and qualified NCA officers the powers of a constable in Northern Ireland. However, the NCA requires authorisation from the Chief Constable of the Police Service of Northern Ireland for the use of covert techniques.

=== Crown Dependencies ===
The NCA also has a role in assisting the Crown Dependencies, having assisted Guernsey and Jersey police on matters of serious crime. In December 2024, a joint investigation conducted by the NCA and the States of Jersey Police led to the disruption of a multi-million pound Russian money laundering network.

== Challenges ==
The NCA faces several challenges. The first of these is the scale of the growing problem facing them. At the end of 2014 UK law enforcement estimated there were 5,800 organised crime groups – comprising some 40,600 individuals. This is an increase of three hundred organised crime groups and 3,500 people on the year before. The National Crime Agency estimates that there are as many as 50,000 people in the UK involved in the downloading and viewing of indecent images online. The director general of the NCA has suggested that the British public cannot expect every person viewing indecent images to enter the criminal justice system – not least because of the sheer scale of the problem. The NCA received 12,505 referrals from the National Centre for Missing and Exploited Children in its first 12 months, compared to 9,855 in 2012, an increase of almost 27 per cent. Tackling modern slavery is another area that the Home Secretary has identified as requiring more effort. The Home Office's Chief Scientific Adviser estimates that there may have been as many as 13,000 potential victims of modern slavery in the UK in 2013. This figure was increased in August 2017 to "tens of thousands of victims". Most will rely on the services of organised criminal groups at some point in their journey to the UK.

In addition to this, the NCA has been tasked with the Rotherham investigation into child sex exploitation. In June 2015, the NCA said the investigation had identified more than 3,300 lines of enquiry and around 300 possible suspects. An earlier report by Alexis Jay had estimated that around 1,400 children were sexually exploited in the town between 1997 and 2013.

The second challenge, of funding and resources, links with the first challenge. Although the NCA budget is half a billion pounds, in proportion to the scale of the problem it is small. The combined budget of previous agencies and units that make up the NCA was almost a billion pounds, so the agency has had an almost 50% cut before its creation. The NCA has 5000 staff, only around 1250 of which are investigators, again small when faced with the problem. For the Rotherham investigation the NCA has had to bring in agency staff who are ex-police to assist with the scale of the investigation.

Thirdly there is the challenge of the "failure" of its predecessor agencies, SOCA and the National Crime squad and the fact that its success needs to be judged over years and not months due to the nature of the threat. SOCA was criticised for poor management and that some staff had poor investigation skills due to not working in law enforcement before. It is suggested that around 300 police detectives left SOCA due to this. With the NCA having the same staff this could be an issue. The NCA has already been criticised for not seizing enough assets (even though they seized more than SOCA in their last year of operation as well as using a search warrant that was judged to be illegal after staff at the agency were "deliberately trying to stretch the boundaries imposed upon such investigation agencies by the statutory scheme under which they operate". Judge Gary Hickinbottom stated, though: "This case smacks of incompetence, not bad faith."

== Organisational structure ==
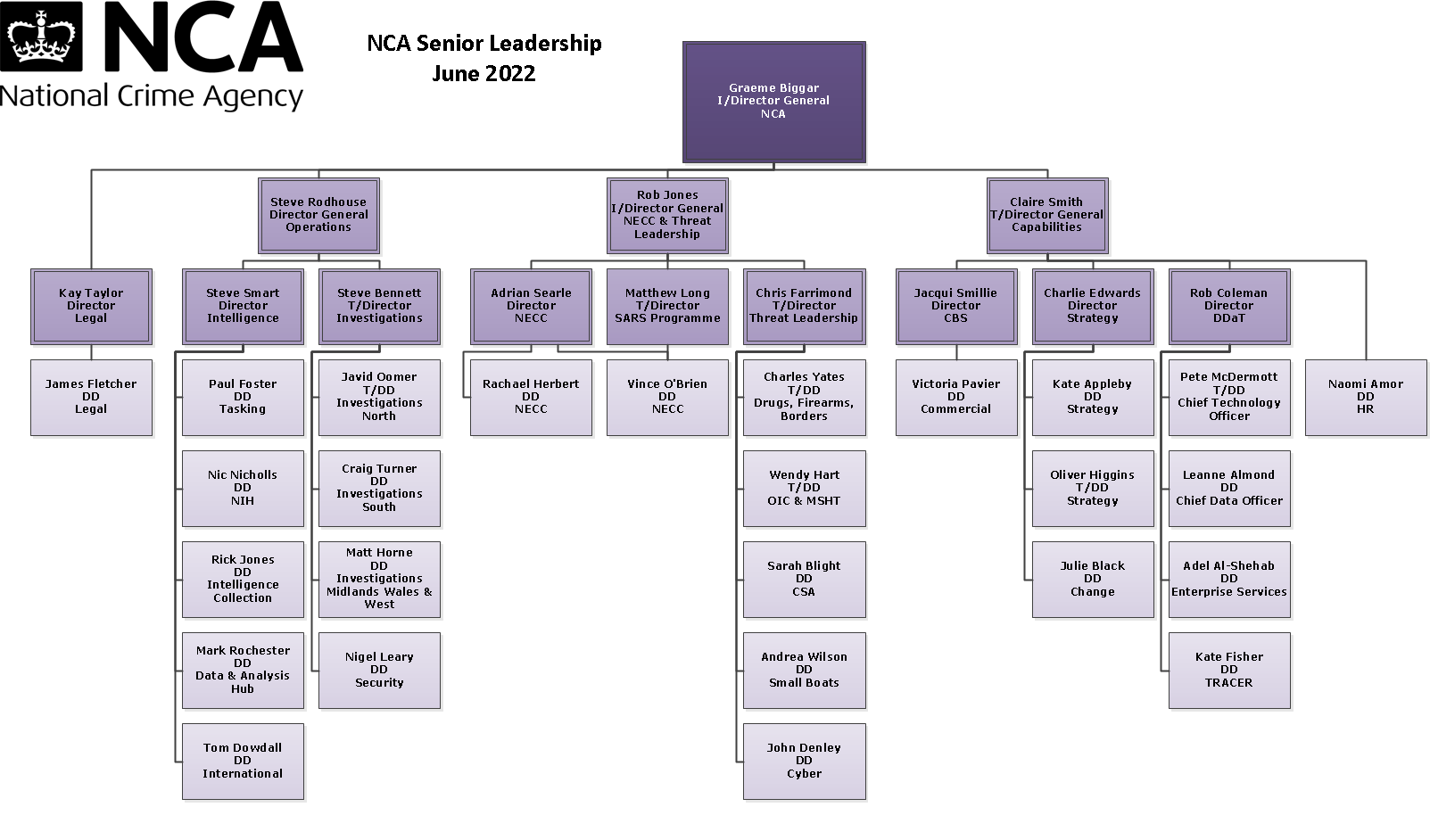
Chart showing the senior management structure of the National Crime Agency

The NCA is organised into eight operational branches, overseen by seven directors, who are in turn overseen by a director general, assisted by a deputy director general. The commands are as follows:

- Border Policing Command
- CEOP Command
- Economic Crime Command
- Organised Crime Command
- Intelligence
- Operations
- Specialist Capabilities
- Proceeds of Crime Centre

The Assets Recovery Agency became part of the Serious Organised Crime Agency from April 2008. This then became the Proceeds of Crime Centre in the NCA. The power to launch civil recovery proceedings has also been extended to the three main prosecutors in England and Wales: the Crown Prosecution Service (CPS), the Revenue and Customs Prosecutions Office (RCPO) and the Serious Fraud Office (SFO). It will also be extended to the Public Prosecution Service in Northern Ireland and the Crown Office and Procurator Fiscal Service in Scotland.

- Missing Persons Bureau

The Missing Persons Bureau (MPB) transferred to SOCA in April 2012 along with SCAS. It had previously been based at New Scotland Yard until April 2008 when it was moved to the NPIA and based in Bramshill.

The bureau acts as the centre for the exchange of information connected with the search for missing persons nationally and internationally. It is responsible for cross-matching missing persons with unidentified persons or bodies, as well as maintaining an index of dental records of missing persons and unidentified bodies.

The MPB also manages a missing persons and Child Rescue Alert website, and analyses data to identify trends and patterns in disappearances.

- UK Human Trafficking Centre
- National Injuries Database

The National Injuries Database also transferred from the NPIA. It provides additional support to police forces by providing analysis of weapons and wounds, and seeking to identify similarities to aid investigators in determining which weapon may have been used. The database holds more than 4,000 cases of suspicious deaths, murders and clinical cases, and contains more than 20,000 images.

- Central Bureau
- Chemical Suspicious Activity Reports
- UK Financial Intelligence Unit

SOCA via the UK Financial Intelligence Unit took over responsibility for dealing with suspicious activity reports (SARs), previously made to the National Criminal Intelligence Service (NCIS) under the money laundering legislation. This function is now part of NCA.

NCIS received slightly fewer than 200,000 SARs in 2005 and throughout its life was heavily critical of the banking and financial services sector, and the Financial Services Authority, for not being more transparent or forthcoming in reporting their customers' suspicious activity.

Despite criticism from professional representative bodies that the disclosure rules are too broad, SOCA said that up to one in three SARs lead to or add substantially to terrorism investigations; that HMRC estimates that around one in five SARs identifies new subjects of interest, and one in four SARs lead to direct tax enquiries; and many arrests and confiscations of criminal assets.

- Serious Crime Analysis Section

The Serious Crime Analysis Section moved to SOCA from the National Policing Improvement Agency on 1 April 2012 in advance of the planned establishment of the National Crime Agency in 2013. SCAS is based at Foxley Hall in the grounds of the Police Staff College, Bramshill in Hampshire. It was originally formed by the Home Office in 1998 to identify the potential emergence of serial killers and serial rapists at the earliest stage of their offending. This scope has since broadened to include the analysis by specialist staff of rapes, serious sexual assaults and motiveless or sexually motivated murders.

Criminal case files are received by SCAS from all police forces in the UK at an early stage in the investigations. The information is coded and placed on a single database, ViCLAS (Violent Crime Linkage Analysis System). The system was developed in Canada by the Royal Canadian Mounted Police.

The investigating officer receives a report from a crime analyst with a number of key elements designed to assist the investigation. It will identify if there are grounds to believe that the offender has previously been identified. It will also provide a breakdown of the behaviour exhibited in the offence, often with a statistical description of some of the elements involved. This can alert an investigator to the importance of some aspects of the offence not immediately apparent. SCAS are also responsible for identifying good practice, or "what works", so the analyst's report may contain "investigative suggestions" that might guide the officer to a specific line of enquiry not yet considered. The report may also suggest possible suspects that the unit has identified from a number of databases. When a prime suspect has been identified and charged with an offence, senior analysts are able to provide specialist evidence in court, to assist with the prosecution of offenders.

- National Cyber Crime Unit
- International Partnership
  - UK National Central Bureau for INTERPOL
  - UK Europol National Unit
  - UK SIRENE Bureau

The NCA is the UK single point of contact for Interpol, Europol and the Schengen Information System, and also the point of contact for international enquiries from all UK police and law enforcement agencies. It has 24/7 capacity for Interpol and Europol with direct connections to their databases, provides international Liaison Officers, and co-ordinates all inbound and outbound Cross Border Surveillance requests with Schengen partners. It also has a dedicated Fugitives Unit that acts as the UK Central Authority for all extraditions.

=== List of directors general ===
1. Keith Bristow (2011–2016)
2. Lynne Owens (2016–2021)
3. Graeme Biggar (2021–present)

=== Regional organised crime units ===
In 2010, nine regional organised crime units (ROCUs) were created across England and Wales outside of London to investigate organised crime in their region and to support the NCA. Each ROCU is supported by a regional intelligence unit which is staffed by police officers and staff from each ROCU's constituent forces.

The Police Service of Northern Ireland, Police Scotland, the City of London Police, and the Metropolitan Police Service each have individual organised crime units which also support the NCA.

The nine ROCUs are:

Abbreviation	Region	Website
EMSOU	East Midlands	https://www.emsou.police.uk/
ERSOU	Eastern	https://www.rocu.police.uk/our-national-network/eastern-ersou/
NEROCU	North East	https://www.rocu.police.uk/our-national-network/eastern-ersou/
NWROCU	North West	https://www.rocu.police.uk/our-national-network/north-west-nwrocu/
SEROCU	South East	https://www.rocu.police.uk/our-national-network/south-east-serocu/
SWROCU	South West	https://www.rocu.police.uk/our-national-network/south-west-swrocu/
TARIAN	Southern Wales	https://www.rocu.police.uk/our-national-network/southern-wales-tarian/
ROCUWM	West Midlands	https://www.rocu.police.uk/our-national-network/west-midlands-rocuwm/
YHROCU	Yorkshire and Humber	https://www.rocu.police.uk/our-national-network/yorkshire-and-humber-yhrocu/

Regional organised crime units bring together a number of specialised teams and functions under the one structure:

- Regional Investigation Unit
- Regional Asset Recovery Unit
- Regional Intelligence Unit
- Regional Protected Persons Unit
- Regional Technical Surveillance Unit
- Regional cyber capability
- Regional Fraud Unit
- Regional Prison Intelligence
- Regional covert capability

==== Multi-agency groups ====
There are special multi-agency teams, an example is the National County Lines Coordination Centre (NCLCC), a multi-agency team drawn from the NCA, police forces and ROCUs. The team develops a national intelligence picture of the threat from county lines crime to improve understanding and scale of child sexual abuse crimes. The NCLCC is responsible for coordinating the response to county lines and managing the flow of intelligence to the police forces and ROCUs.

== Notable operations ==
On 22 May 2014 at around 22:50, NCA officers were involved in a shootout in Tottenham. Several shots were fired, including from NCA officers. Two men were arrested at the scene by the NCA for attempted murder and possession of a firearm with intent to endanger life. The Metropolitan Police arrived and arrested a third man for possession of a firearm. This is believed to be the first incident in which NCA officers fired shots.

On 25 May 2014 at 00:00, a second NCA operation was carried out in Tottenham, along with officers from the Metropolitan Police, after the NCA received intelligence about the earlier shoot out. Two more men were arrested, one for attempted murder and possession of a firearm with intent to endanger life and the other for assisting an offender, after their car was stopped by armed officers. One shot was fired by a Metropolitan Police officer during the operation.

In May 2014, the NCA conducted a major operation that resulted in the seizing of more than 100 kg of cocaine from a Greek bulk freighter in Scotland. The ship had been returning from Colombia; the operation resulted in the arrest of three men.

In July 2014, the NCA with partners jointly disrupted the "Shylock" banking trojan believed to have infected at least 30,000 computers.

Also in July 2014, the NCA co-ordinated the arrest of 660 suspected paedophiles. 39 of those arrested were registered sex offenders, but the majority had not previously come to the attention of law enforcement. 400 children are believed to have been protected by this operation, which included apprehending several individuals who had unsupervised access to children such as doctors, teachers and care workers.

In November 2016, the NCA began a campaign, including releasing a video, to educate the public on sextortion, providing advice on protecting oneself from being subject to sextortion and how to respond to a case of online blackmail.

On 2 July 2020, the NCA reported it had co-ordinated the largest law enforcement operation of its kind in the UK when it announced the results of Operation Venetic. Working with all the police forces of the UK and other law enforcement bodies, officers made 746 arrests and seized £54 million of drug money, 77 firearms, 1,800 rounds of ammunition, 4 hand grenades, 55 high value (possibly stolen) cars and 2 tonnes of illegal drugs. The operation was possible after an international law enforcement team cracked the encryption of a mobile phone instant messaging service from EncroChat. Law enforcement in France and the Netherlands also carried out related operations with the assistance of Europol.

On 20 February 2024, the NCA, in collaboration with Europol and other law enforcement agencies, announced that it had seized websites and infrastructure belonging to the ransomware group LockBit. More than 1,000 decryption keys were obtained, with the victims of the attacks to be contacted about the decryption of their data. In May 2024, the Operation Cronos investigation, led by the NCA, identified Russian national Dmitry Khoroshev as LockBitSupp, the administrator and developer of LockBit. The UK, US and Australia imposed sanctions on him, including asset freezes and travel bans.

On 4 December 2024, the NCA revealed Operation Destabilise, an NCA-led international investigation into two Russian money laundering networks, Smart and TGR Group. The two networks had links to criminal organisations in the UK, drug cartels in South America, the Kinahan Organised Crime Group, Russian espionage efforts, and sanction avoidance. The investigation up to that point had led to the arrest of 84 people, 71 of whom were arrested in the UK, while six individuals, both major money laundering networks and several companies had been sanctioned, while a seventh linked individual was arrested for the facilitation of money laundering. In total, approximately £20 million had been seized out of an estimated £700 million in drugs sales.

In April 2026 the NCA, along with the German federal BKA and the Hamburg LKA, launched Project Medusa, an unprecedented, transnational operation targeting on-line networks which aided, abetted, and arranged drug-facilitated sexual assaults (DFSA). Internationally 57 arrests were made and some 157 victims safeguarded; 113 investigations engendered, and four heretofore unknown misogynist networks were identified. Numerous nation-state law enforcement agencies were involved, as was the European Union's Europol. The crimes often took place in domestic settings between intimate partners (as in the preceding Gisèle Pelicot case in France.)

== See also ==
- British intelligence agencies
- Joint Operations Cell
