= List of killings as part of the Hutch–Kinahan feud =

The Hutch–Kinahan feud is an ongoing gangland feud in Ireland between the Hutch and Kinahan crime families. The feud began in 2015, and has since claimed 19 lives.

A 19th man Glen Clarke (26), named as a Kinahan hitman, was found fatally shot in a stolen car in the Riverdale estate, Leixlip, Co. Kildare in 2016. It is suspected that he might have shot himself accidentally although his family dispute this version of events. A 2020 inquest was told that the bullet that killed Clarke was never found. The coroner returned an open verdict, reflecting the lack of evidence available for a suicide or misadventure verdict.

Name	Year of death	Classification (Note: In this list, a homicide is deemed a murder if someone has been convicted of murder, otherwise it is listed as a killing.)	Age at death	Criminal association	Main article	Notes
Gary Hutch	2015	Murder	34	Hutch and Kinahan		The murder of Gary Hutch instigated the feud
Darren Kearns	2015	Killing	33	Hutch		
David Byrne	2016	Killing	34	Kinahan	Killing of David Byrne	
Eddie Hutch Senior	2016	Killing	59	Hutch	Killing of Eddie Hutch Snr	
Vincent Ryan	2016	Murder	25	Real IRA		While sources agree that Ryan was killed by the Kinahans, not all link the killing to the Hutch-Kinahan feud, nor do they mention links to the Hutch family.
Noel Duggan	2016	Killing	55	Hutch		
Martin O'Rourke	2016	Killing	24	None		Case of mistaken identity
Michael Barr	2016	Murder	35	Hutch	Murder of Michael Barr	
Gareth Hutch	2016	Murder	36	Hutch	Murder of Gareth Hutch	
David Douglas	2016	Murder	54	Hutch	Murder of David Douglas	
Trevor O'Neill	2016	Killing	41	None		Case of mistaken identity
Noel Kirwan	2016	Killing	62	Hutch	Killing of Noel Kirwan	
Michael Keogh	2017	Killing	37	Kinahan		
Jamie Tighe Ennis	2017	Killing	24	Hutch		
Kane Kirwan McCormack	2017	Killing	24	Hutch		
Derek Coakley-Hutch	2018	Killing	27	Hutch		
Jason Molyneux	2018	Killing	27	Hutch		
Clive Staunton	2018	Killing	50	Ambiguous		It is unclear whether Staunton was associated with the Hutch family or with the Kinahan family.
Eric Fowler	2018	Killing	34	Kinahan		
