= Daniel Kinahan =

Irish sports promoter and suspected crime boss (born 1977)

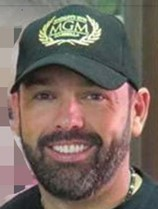
- Image of Kinahan from a 2022 DEA wanted poster
- Born: Daniel Joseph Kinahan; 25 June 1977 (age 49); Dublin, Ireland
- Relatives: Christy Kinahan (father); Christopher Kinahan Junior (brother)
- Reward amount: US$15 million
- Capture status: Remanded in custody
- Wanted since: 12 April 2022

Details
- Date apprehended: 15 April 2026
- Imprisoned at: Portlaoise Prison, Ireland

Daniel Joseph Kinahan (born 25 June 1977) is an Irish suspected crime boss and former boxing promoter. He has been named by the High Court of Ireland as a senior figure in organised crime on a global scale.

The Criminal Assets Bureau has stated he "controlled and managed" the operations of the Kinahan Organised Crime Group (commonly called the Kinahan Cartel), a criminal organisation which smuggles drugs and firearms into Ireland, the UK, and mainland Europe, and "has associations that facilitate international criminal activity in Europe, Asia, the Middle East, and South America."

The Kinahan Cartel has had an ongoing feud with the Hutch gang. The feud began in 2015, when Gary Hutch was murdered in Marbella, Spain by the Kinahan gang. As of August 2021, at least 18 people have been killed in the feud, mostly on the streets of Dublin.

In October 2022, the head of the An Garda Síochána Drugs and Organised Crime Bureau stated in an affidavit to the Irish High Court that Kinahan had "sanctioned a number of murders" as part of the Hutch–Kinahan feud, during a CAB court case where properties were ordered seized by the judge as it was proven they were the proceeds of crime.

In October 2024, Garda Commissioner Drew Harris urged Kinahan's associates to turn him in for the US offered reward of $15 million and witness protection.

Kinahan was arrested in Dubai in April 2026, following an arrest warrant issued by the Irish courts in relation to alleged serious organised crime offences. He was extradited from Dubai on 9 August 2026 and flown on an Irish Air Corps jet to Dublin. He appeared at the Special Criminal Court and was charged with "directing the activities of a criminal organisation"; he was remanded in custody and transported to the maximum-security Portlaoise Prison in County Laois.

== Early life ==
Daniel Joseph Kinahan was born on 25 June 1977 in Dublin, Ireland, the eldest son of Jean Boylan (died 2014) and Christy Kinahan. His father is a convicted drug dealer who was widely reported to be the founder and leader of the Kinahan Cartel. He is a second cousin of Janice Boylan, a Sinn Féin member of Dublin City Council. Kinahan grew up in Tallaght before moving to the Oliver Bond flats in the Liberties area. At the age of 23, he was one of five people arrested in connection with a "vicious attack" on two members of the Garda Síochána outside Shelbourne Park; he was charged with assault and refused bail by Dublin District Court. The charges were dropped the next year. Kinahan previously ran a furniture store in Dublin.

In 2007, Kinahan was reported to be part of a bet-to-lose syndicate involving jockey Kieren Fallon.

== Kinahan Cartel ==
A chart of the Kinahan Organized Crime Group created by the U.S. Office of Foreign Assets Control

=== Overview ===
In a 2009 diplomatic cable sent from a U.S. embassy in South America to The Pentagon, Kinahan was described as a "suspected international drug-trafficking figure". He is banned from entering the US, having been placed on a list of "narco terrorists", compiled by the FBI and Drug Enforcement Administration. There are 27 other associates of the Kinahan Cartel who are also banned from entering the US, including his father, Christy Kinahan, and brother Christopher Jr. Kinahan is reported to be a target for the UK's National Crime Agency.

Kinahan was arrested in Spain in 2010 during a joint operation between Spanish, Irish, and British authorities, in which the British Serious Organised Crime Agency (the predecessor to the National Crime Agency) deployed more than 200 officers in the arrest phase of the multinational drug trafficking inquiry.

=== Drug Enforcement Agency documents ===
DEA documents sent to the Dutch police exposed what would be a super drug cartel headed by Daniel Kinahan, Raffaele Imperiale (Camorra's drugs and arms dealer), Ridouan Taghi (Dutch criminal, now in jail) and Edin Gačanin (Bosnian drug trafficker). The group was observed by the DEA having meetings in the Burj Al Arab hotel in Dubai, the base of the alleged cartel. The meetings took place in 2017, however, it reached the Dutch media only in October 2019. The DEA regards this as one of the world's fifty largest drug cartels, with a virtual monopoly of Peruvian cocaine and it would control around a third of the cocaine trade in Europe. According to the DEA documents, the destination for all the drugs shipments would be Dutch ports.

=== Hutch–Kinahan feud ===
Kinahan and his family were involved in the Hutch-Kinahan feud, along with the Hutch gang. The feud began with the murder of Hutch gang member Gary Hutch in Spain in 2015; in 2018, a Spanish police officer told a court in Marbella that Kinahan had ordered Hutch's murder. The murder sparked a feud where at least eighteen people have been killed. The Kinahans were believed to be behind a number of murders in the feud; Eddie Hutch Snr. was shot dead in North Strand Dublin in February 2016, Gareth Hutch was shot dead in May 2016 and another nephew Derek Coakley-Hutch was shot dead in January 2018. Other associates of Hutch killed in the feud included cigarette smuggler Noel "Kingsize" Duggan in March 2016, and Noel "Duck Egg" Kirwan, who was shot dead in December 2016; neither of these were involved with the gang and were killed merely for their association with Gerry Hutch. The feud also saw two innocents, Martin O'Rourke and Trevor O'Neill, killed by Kinahan gang members in cases of mistaken identity.

Kinahan was the reported target of the 2016 Regency Hotel Shooting in Dublin, in which three people were shot, including 32-year-old Kinahan associate David Byrne, who was shot dead. It was reported that the Garda Síochána believed Kinahan fled the attack by jumping out of a window. He has also been the target of at least one more assassination attempt.

=== Sanctions in Ireland ===
A house in the Coldwater Lakes area of Saggart was searched by Gardaí on 29 January 2015. Evidence that Daniel Kinahan had lived there was found, including a passport in his name and an Aer Lingus baggage sticker also in his name. Also found were a Ryanair boarding pass on an iPad in the name of his younger brother Christopher and documentation relating to James Quinn, who is in jail in Spain on murder charges. Matthew Macklin was in the house at the time of the search, along with items belonging to MTK Global. The Criminal Assets Bureau tried to contact Daniel Kinahan in relation to the house, but he did not reply.

The High Court was told in 2022 that Daniel Kinahan and Thomas Kavanagh had given €4.5m in two suitcases to Jim Mansfield Jnr to invest, but that the deal had collapsed when his finances suffered during the economic downturn. He later reached a deal with them to repay the house, which he had owned since 2014. The court found the property to be proceeds of drug trafficking. It is the first such property to be seized from him and was auctioned off in December 2024.

In March 2022, it was revealed that the Criminal Assets Bureau was pursuing a case against Kinahan, Jim Mansfield Jnr and fellow cartel member Thomas "Bomber" Kavanagh. The case had been pursued for over a year in secret, with Mansfield as the main target, with Kinahan and Kavanagh, among others as respondents.

=== United States sanctions ===
In April 2022 the Office of Foreign Assets Control (OFAC) of the United States Department of the Treasury imposed sanctions on Daniel Kinahan, his father Christy Kinahan and brother Christy Kinahan Jr. as well as four other key associates of the Kinahan family. The OFAC notice refers to the family and its associates collectively as the "Kinahan Organized Crime Group" or "KOCG." The action adds the Crime Group to the Specially Designated Nationals and Blocked Persons List, pursuant to the United States International Emergency Economic Powers Act and Executive Order 13581.

The addition to SDN List blocks any property of the designated persons within the United States financial system, and prohibits United States persons from business dealings with them. Violations of the sanctions, including assisting in their evasion, come with a maximum criminal penalty of twenty years imprisonment.

On 12 April 2022, the United States Department of State announced the offering of rewards of up to US$5 million under the Narcotics Rewards Program for information leading to the arrest and/or conviction of the Kinahan family members. The reward is offered jointly with the Garda Síochána, National Crime Agency, and Drug Enforcement Administration.

On the morning of Monday 13 September 2022, a combined force of six enforcement agencies led by the Spanish Civil Guard's elite Central Operative Unit, arrested English-born former Cork restaurateur John Francis "Johnny" Morrissey at his villa in Marbella, Spain. Known to be a former enforcer and current money-launderer for the KOCG, he was the first of the seven named by the OFAC to be arrested, having fled Ireland more than 20 years before after reportedly being involved in a bid to harm a Criminal Assets Bureau officer in Ireland. Morrissey gained notoriety from being part of the team publicising his wife Nicola's Scottish-based Nero Drinks Company Ltd, which was thought to be part of Morrissey's €200 million EUR annual money-laundering operation, leading to her arrest as well at the same time.

=== Bank accounts freeze ===
On 21 April 2022, the United Arab Emirates froze his assets, including both personal and business bank accounts.

== 2026 arrest and extradition ==
On 15 April 2026, Kinahan was arrested in Dubai on foot of an Irish arrest warrant in relation to organised crime charges; he was detained within 48 hours of the warrant being issued, and legal proceedings began for his extradition to Ireland.

On 9 August, Kinahan was extradited from Dubai and flown to Baldonnell Air Base by the Irish Air Corps, before being driven by armed police escort to appear at the Special Criminal Court (SCC), in the Criminal Courts of Justice, Dublin. The SCC is a juryless court reserved for serious organised crime and terrorism cases, decided by three judges.

Appearing on the evening of his extradition, Kinahan was charged by the court with "directing the activities of a criminal organisation" and was remanded in custody. He was then transported to the high-security Portlaoise Prison in County Laois, where he will remain on remand until at least 5 October.

On 5 October he appeared via videolink from Portlaoise prison before the Special Criminal Court. He is to be represented by a solicitor from Belfast and is remanded to appear before the court in person the following Monday.

== Boxing promotion ==
=== Overview ===
In 2012, Kinahan founded MTK Global (originally named MGM) with Irish boxer Matthew Macklin in Marbella, Spain. Since its founding, MTK Global has signed a host of world-class fighters, such as Tyson Fury and Darren Till. In 2017, in the wake of the shooting of David Byrne of which Kinahan was considered the main target, MTK Global claimed to have cut its ties with Kinahan. However, he has remained a prominent figure in the international boxing world, including as an advisor and matchmaker for Fury.

Despite the apparent cutting of ties with MTK Global in February 2017, Kinahan remained an active figure in global boxing. On 10 June 2020, it was reported that Tyson Fury and Anthony Joshua had reached an agreement in principle for a two-fight deal, which pundits touted as the "biggest fight in British boxing history". Fury publicly thanked Kinahan for helping to broker the agreement. "Big shout-out Dan, he got this done, literally over the line, two-fight deal, Tyson Fury versus Anthony Joshua next year." he said. In March 2022, Mauricio Sulaimán, President World Boxing Council (WBC) said of Kinahan: “I am nobody to judge any person, and that has been the policy of our organisation, to combat all types of discrimination and abuse of power, before any person and group. That is why Daniel will have our full support in his quest to bring benefits to boxing.”

In June 2020, the Irish government expressed its "outrage" over the involvement of Kinahan in the brokering of the proposed boxing agreement, leading to Kinahan being named in the Irish parliament, Dáil Éireann, and being singled out by Taoiseach Leo Varadkar, the country's prime minister. The Irish Department of Foreign Affairs contacted authorities in the United Arab Emirates regarding Kinahan. BBC News reported that "politicians, police officers and the public in Ireland are keen that the outside world get to know what they call the real Daniel Kinahan."

Also in June 2020, Kinahan, who served as a "special adviser" to KHK Sports was dropped from the role after just a month. KHK Sports, owned by Khalid bin Hamad Al Khalifa, a son of the king of Bahrain, enlisted the assistance of the head of international media relations for the Bahrain government, in communicating the statement of Kinahan's termination in the role to media outlets directly.

=== Panorama documentary ===
In February 2021 BBC Panorama broadcast a report on Kinahan's involvement in boxing. Barry McGuigan spoke of intimidation in boxing. Daniel Kinahan denied the allegations.

Robert Smith, of the British Boxing Board of Control, said that there was nothing that the Board could do about Kinahan. On the Panorama programme, lawyers acting for MTK Global confirmed that Kinahan was still advising fighters. Smith said "It was disappointing for the sport, obviously, but the gentleman is not licensed by the British Boxing Board in any capacity. We don’t license MTK as a promoter. We license individuals so the named promoter is Lee Eaton and he is the only person we deal with." (Lee Eaton is an employee of MTK Global.) Smith said that a loophole in the regulations of the Board meant that they were powerless to regulate "advisers" such as Kinahan.

On 5 February the Police Service of Northern Ireland (PSNI) announced that the Panorama team who produced the documentary had been threatened. One journalist was forced to move out of his home in Northern Ireland and his family were moved to a secure location under PSNI protection due to a threat to his life.

On 7 February 2021 Billy Joe Saunders, a boxer who employs Kinahan as adviser, sent journalist Nicola Tallant direct messages on Twitter challenging her "write something positive about Daniel Kinahan" in exchange for being granted a face-to-face interview with Kinahan. Tallant, who writes for the Sunday World, rejected the offer.

On 8 February 2021, Kinahan issued a statement to Talksport in the UK denying that he was part of any criminal organisation. He also denied making threats to a journalist and confirmed that he was still involved in boxing. He claimed the Panorama programme "was a rehash of unsubstantiated allegations that have been made previously on many occasions". He criticised the Special Criminal Court (despite being named as very senior figure in organised crime on a global scale by the High Court – not the SCC) and said he had no convictions. Kinahan has never contested findings of fact made against him in Irish courts.

=== Summons issued ===
In December 2020 a racketeering summons was served to him in Dubai by US lawyers. Boxing promoter Moses Herrida filed a civil cause of action over the signing of Joseph Diaz while he was under contract to Herrida Boxing Management. He alleged that after Diaz won the world championship in 2020 MTK had offered him an advance of $100,000 (₡81,500) in breach of a five-year contract the boxer had signed with HBM. Herrida also claims that Daniel Kinahan and MTK are in breach of the RICO Act, which can be used in civil cases.

Herrida alleges that Kinahan founded MTK Global as a "front business" to launder illicit proceeds from drug trafficking and that despite claims that Kinahan is no longer involved with the organisation he is still "influencing and controlling" it. Kinahan has to file a response with the United States District Court for the Central District of California or face judgment being entered against him by default.

== Personal life ==
As of 2019, Kinahan and his brother Christopher Jr. lived in Dubai. According to the Office of Foreign Assets Control, he has a residence in the Palm Jumeirah. He has been married to Caoimhe Robinson since 2017. Formerly the partner of murdered drug lord Micka Kelly, Robinson is from the Coolock area of Dublin. Their wedding, held at the Burj Al Arab hotel, was attended by criminals from various backgrounds such as Ridouan Taghi (Moroccan-Dutch), Ricardo Riquelme Vega (Chilean), and Raffaele Imperiale (Italian). As of 2021, Dutch police were investigating claims by a man known as Nabil B that they were working together, with the wedding party helping investigators identify a "super cartel" alliance. Messages recovered from Ennetcom servers have also supported claims that the criminals in question were doing business together.

Kinahan is believed to be the father of at least six children by three different mothers according to The New Yorker.
