= Mauricio Sulaimán =

President of the World Boxing Council

Mauricio Sulaimán Saldivar
- Sulaimán in 2019

2nd president of the World Boxing Council
- Incumbent
- Assumed office 11 February 2014
- Preceded by: José Sulaimán

Secretary General of World Boxing Council

Personal details
- Born: December 30, 1969 (age 56) Mexico City, Mexico
- Education: Tecnológico de Monterrey
- Occupation: President of the World Boxing Council (WBC)
- Profession: Sports administrator
- Sports career
- Sport: Boxing, Professional Boxing

Mauricio Sulaimán Saldivar (born 30 December 1969) is a Mexican businessman and sports administrator. Since February 11, 2014, he has served as the president of the World Boxing Council (WBC), one of the four major international boxing organizations. Prior to his presidency, he served as the organization's secretary general.

== Early life and education ==
Sulaimán was born in Mexico City to José Sulaimán, the former president of the WBC, and Marta Saldivar. Growing up in a household deeply connected to boxing, he was exposed to the sport from an early age. Notably, renowned boxers such as Muhammad Ali, Sugar Ray Leonard, Mike Tyson, and Julio César Chávez were frequent visitors to his family home. He pursued higher education at the Monterrey Institute of Technology and Higher Education (Tecnológico de Monterrey).

== Personal ==
Sulaimán is the son of the previous WBC president, José Sulaimán, and of Marta Saldívar. He has three brothers (José, Hector, and Fernando) and two sisters (Lucy and Claudia).

== Career ==
=== Pre-presidency ===
Before ascending to the presidency of the WBC, Sulaimán served as the organization's secretary general. In this role, he was involved in various administrative and organizational aspects of the council, contributing to its global operations and initiatives.

=== WBC presidency ===
Sulaimán was unanimously elected as WBC President on February 11, 2014, following the death of his father. Under his leadership, the council has introduced several reforms and health-focused programs, such as:

- The Clean Boxing Program, which established a partnership with VADA (Voluntary Anti-Doping Association) to implement random drug testing.
- The Weight Management Program, which includes mandatory pre-fight weight checks to reduce health risks.
- The José Sulaimán Boxers Fund, created to financially support retired and ailing boxers.

He also initiated a research collaboration with UCLA to study and prevent long-term brain injury in fighters, reflecting a growing emphasis on athlete safety.

Sulaimán has represented the WBC meetings including discussions with the United Nations and policy briefings at the White House.

== Awards and recognitions ==
- 2020 Mexican National Sports Award: Conferred by the president of Mexico, Andrés Manuel López Obrador, this award recognized Sulaimán's dedication to promoting and protecting sports practice in Mexico. Notably, his father, José Sulaimán, received the same honor in 2015.
- 2021 Spirit of Boxing Award: Presented by the Boxing Writers Association at the Edison Ballroom in New York City, this award honored Sulaimán's humanitarian efforts, transparency, and steadfast support of the sport.
- 2021 Muhammad Ali Humanitarian Award: Bestowed by the Nevada Boxing Hall of Fame, this award recognized Sulaimán's generosity and compassion outside the ring, particularly his support for professional boxers facing health challenges and his commitment to their education and that of their families.
- 2023 Man of the Year Award: Awarded by the Qualitas of Life Foundation during its 15th Anniversary celebration, this honor acknowledged Sulaimán's contributions to financial literacy initiatives benefiting the Hispanic community, including professional boxers.
- 2024 Alfredo Harp Helú Distinction Award: Presented by the Alfredo Harp Helú Foundation and the Government of Mexico City, this award recognized Sulaimán's unwavering and inspirational contributions to sports and physical culture in Mexico City.
- 2024 Recognition from Universidad Anáhuac: Sulaimán received an award from Universidad Anáhuac for his outstanding contributions to sports and his efforts in promoting ethical values through boxing.

== Controversy ==
Sulaimán has been criticized for praising Daniel Kinahan's work as a boxing promoter. Kinahan is infamously known for being part of a powerful Irish criminal syndicate run by his father, Christy Kinahan and who is involved in a violent war with another notorious gang, led by Gerry "The Monk" Hutch. In April 2022, Kinahan, his father and his younger brother were sanctioned by the US government for their activities linked to organized crime and had their assets frozen by both the US government and the UAE. Sulaimán, who had met with Kinahan in Dubai a week before the sanctions, denied having any affiliation with him, saying he was unaware that Kinahan was a high-ranking member of a powerful international criminal syndicate.

== See also ==
- World Boxing Council (WBC)
