= Tony Hunt (judge) =

Irish barrister, High Court judge since 2014

The Hon. Mr. Justice Tony Hunt

Judge of the High Court
- Incumbent
- Assumed office 30 October 2014
- Nominated by: Government of Ireland
- Appointed by: Michael D. Higgins

Judge of the Circuit Court
- In office 15 May 2007 – 30 October 2014
- Nominated by: Government of Ireland
- Appointed by: Mary McAleese

Personal details
- Education: University College Dublin; King's Inns

Tony Hunt is an Irish judge who has served as a Judge of the High Court since October 2014, and is the senior presiding judge of the Special Criminal Court. He previously served as a Judge of the Circuit Court from 2007 and 2014.

== Education ==
Hunt attended University College Dublin from where he obtained a BCL degree in 1984. He subsequently attended the King's Inns to study to become a barrister.

== Legal career ==
Hunt was called to the Bar in 1986. He was an appointee of the Bar Council to the Superior Court Rules Committee.

Much of his practice was spent appearing in criminal trials as prosecuting counsel for the Director of Public Prosecutions. He acted in trials involving assault, sexual assault, manslaughter, drugs offences, and tax offences. He acted for defendants in traffic offences, and sexual assault cases.

Hunt also represented clients in cases involving injunctions, contracts, and personal injuries.

== Judicial career ==
=== Circuit Court ===
His career on the bench began in May 2007 when he was appointed a judge of the Circuit Court. From March 2012, he was assigned to the Midland Circuit.

He was a member of the Circuit Court Rules Committee. He replaced Yvonne Murphy as a member of the Working Group on Efficiency Measures in the Criminal Justice System for the Circuit and District Courts in February 2012.

=== High Court ===
Hunt was elevated to the High Court in October 2014, coinciding with multiple vacancies created on the court following the creation by the Court of Appeal.

Hunt frequently hears cases from the Central Criminal Court, including those involving murder, manslaughter, and rape. In 2015, he was the judge in the trial of Graham Dwyer arising out of the murder of Elaine O'Hara. The trial lasted 46 days and attracted much media and public attention. In 2023, he was the judge in the trial of Jozef Puška, arising out of the high-profile murder of Ashling Murphy. Hunt has also heard extradition applications.

He is the senior presiding judge of the Special Criminal Court. He has heard cases concerning dissident republicanism and the Hutch–Kinahan feud, including the shooting of Gareth Hutch, Dessie O'Hare, and the kidnapping of Kevin Lunney. In May 2020, he described the Kinahan organisation as having a "hierarchical structure" containing "cells and sub-cells" to engage in "execution-type murders" related to international "organised drugs and firearm trafficking". This was the first time a judge had outlined the organisation in such a way in court.
