= Christy Kinahan =

Irish crime boss (born 1957)

- A 2022 wanted poster of Kinahan by the DEA
- Born: Christopher Vincent Kinahan; 23 March 1957 (age 69); Dublin, Ireland
- Other name: Christopher Vincent
- Spouses: Jean Boylan; Jacqueline Kallenbach
- Children: Daniel Kinahan; Christopher Kinahan Jr.
- Reward amount: US$5 million
- Capture status: Fugitive
- Wanted by: Garda Síochána; NCA; DEA
- Wanted since: 12 April 2022

Christopher Vincent Kinahan Sr. (born 23 March 1957) (Note: Based on passport records, U.S. Department of the Treasury's Specially Designated Nationals lists Kinahan's date of birth as 23 March 1957. However, he is known to use identification with dates of birth including 19 November 1952 and 23 May 1957.) is an Irish drug trafficker and fugitive with convictions for ecstasy, heroin smuggling and fraud. He is the alleged leader of the Kinahan Organised Crime Group, which he is thought to run with his two sons, Daniel and Christopher Kinahan Jr.

He has been wanted since 2022 by the Garda Síochána, the Drug Enforcement Administration (US), and the National Crime Agency (UK). A US$5 million reward has been offered by the US State Department for information leading to his capture. The US Treasury Department also imposed sanctions in 2022 on the Kinahan family and alleged associates. In 2026, Kinahan's son, Daniel, was captured in Dubai and extradited to Ireland.

== Criminal career ==
According to The Guardian newspaper, Kinahan was born in St Teresa's Gardens, Dublin, in the south inner city, although an Irish passport cited by the U.S. Office of Foreign Assets Control (OFAC) lists his primary place of birth as Cabra, Dublin, further north. The OFAC also note that he uses a British passport stating his place of birth as Perivale. The Irish Independent states that his father was a dairy farm manager. His mother operated a bed and breakfast. Kinahan was raised as the only son in a middle-class family in Dublin.

Kinahan began his career in crime as a fraudster, specialising in cheque fraud, often using his well-spoken manner to pass as an Englishman or upper-class Irishman. By his late 20s, Kinahan was acting as a "fixer" for criminal gangs in the north inner city of Dublin. He later became involved in the lucrative heroin business during Dublin's heroin epidemic of the 1980s. Kinahan became the city's preeminent heroin supplier after the Dublin drug lord Larry Dunne was imprisoned and his network disbanded.

Living in a luxury flat complex in the affluent north Dublin suburb of Clontarf and driving a red sports car, Kinahan came to the attention of a Garda Síochána drug squad. In 1986, Kinahan and an Algerian drug trafficker were caught with a quantity of heroin valued at £117,000 when the gardai raided Kinahan's Clontarf flat. He was subsequently jailed for six years after being arrested in Marino for crimes related to the seizure of this heroin. While serving his sentence at Mountjoy Prison, Kinahan made contacts with other criminals with whom he later associated in the drug trade.

Kinahan was released from prison in 1992. He was again arrested in 1993; charged with possession of stolen cheques, but was bailed and fled to the UK.

After sweeping new legislation was passed by the Irish parliament to tackle the growing drug trade in Ireland, the Criminal Assets Bureau (CAB) was formed to seize the assets of drug traffickers. The formation of the CAB caused Kinahan to flee the country and take refuge in Amsterdam, a city described by the Irish journalist Paul Williams as "the Wall Street of the international drug market". Operating from Amsterdam's De Wallen district, Kinahan capitalised on the ecstasy boom of the 1990s. His sons, Daniel and Christopher Kinahan Jr., oversaw the distribution of the drug in the south inner city of Dublin. In the Netherlands, Kinahan was joined by the Irish fugitive John "the Colonel" Cunningham, with whom he had shared a landing at Mountjoy Prison. Cunningham served 17 years for kidnapping the heiress Jennifer Guinness. Kinahan introduced Cunningham to the drug trade and the pair became partners in crime.

Kinahan was wanted by Irish authorities for cashing £16,000 of stolen traveller's cheques which were taken in an armed robbery. In early 1997, he was arrested on the stolen cheque charges after returning to Dublin to attend his father's funeral. Kinahan was denied bail and eventually jailed for four years at Portlaoise Prison, Ireland's main maximum security prison. He studied for two degrees whilst in prison, and refused early release in 2001 to complete a degree. While in prison he also learned to speak both Spanish and Dutch. He moved to Europe in the early 2000s, where he is suspected of setting up drug routes into Western Europe for Mexican and Colombian cartels, and the Russian mafia.

He is believed, by UK detectives, to have laundered drug-dealing profits by funding 27 fixed horse races between December 2002 and August 2004. As a result of the alleged conspiracy, jockeys Kieren Fallon, Darren Williams and Fergal Lynch, faced criminal horse race-fixing charges at the Old Bailey.

By February 2010 Kinahan was awaiting sentence in Belgium on money laundering charges.

His home was raided by Spanish police in 2010, he spent a few months in jail, though no charges were brought. This allowed him to then continue on directing an international drug supply operation from his €6 million villa in Estepona on the Costa del Sol.

His ex-wife lived in Dublin and died in 2015. His son Daniel is a boxing promoter, lived in a villa in Guadalmina before moving to Dubai, and allegedly ran the day-to-day aspects of his father's gang until Daniel was extradited and arrested in Ireland in August 2026. He was probably the main target of the Regency Hotel shooting. His son Christopher Jr is also involved in boxing.

In March 2016 Julio Martinez, the chief prosecutor for the Marbella area, told El País that charges against Kinahan for money laundering were imminent. Christy Kinahan already has convictions for money laundering in Ireland, the Netherlands and Belgium.

In September 2020 Spanish authorities charged Kinahan with passport fraud.

=== Hutch-Kinahan feud ===
Gary Hutch was blamed for an attempt on Daniel Kinahan's life, so the Kinahans ordered him to be shot. He was murdered in Málaga in late 2015. Gary Hutch was the nephew of Gerry 'The Monk' Hutch, an armed robber and leader of the Hutch gang in Ireland, and Gerry Hutch is said to have taken the murder personally, refusing any attempt at a 'sit down' made by the Kinahans.

On New Year's Eve 2015, gunmen associated with Kinahan are believed to have targeted Gerry Hutch at a pub in Lanzarote. However, he had already left the bar.

In January 2016, in an event that received international media attention, hitmen working for Gerry Hutch dressed up as Gardaí before attacking a boxing weigh-in at the Regency Hotel in North Dublin. It is believed they were aiming for Christy Kinahan's son Daniel, who was in attendance.

=== Fugitive ===
A chart of the "Kinahan Organized Crime Group" created by the Office of Foreign Assets Control.

In April 2022 the Office of Foreign Assets Control of the United States Department of the Treasury imposed sanctions on Christy Kinahan, his sons Daniel and brother Christy Jr. as well as several associates of the Kinahan family. The OFAC notice refers to the family and its associates collectively as the "Kinahan Organized Crime Group" or "KOCG." The action adds the Crime Group to the Specially Designated Nationals and Blocked Persons List, pursuant to the United States International Emergency Economic Powers Act and Executive Order 13581.

The addition to SDN List blocks any property of the designated persons within the United States financial system, and prohibits United States persons from business dealings with them. Violations of the sanctions, including assisting in their evasion, come with a maximum criminal penalty of twenty years imprisonment.

On 12 April 2022, the United States Department of State announced the offering of rewards of up to US$5 million under the Narcotics Rewards Program for information leading to the arrest and/or conviction of the Kinahan family members. The reward is offered jointly with the Garda Síochána, National Crime Agency, and Drug Enforcement Administration.

Kinahan is believed to be hiding in Dubai, a claim supported by Google Maps reviews posted as recently as 2023 under the alias 'Christopher Vincent' which appear to show his reflection in attached photos. The nature of the stores and restaurants reviewed point towards a luxurious lifestyle within the UAE, as well as detailing trips to Egypt, Zimbabwe, and Hong Kong for unspecified business. Daniel, Kinahan's son and alleged accomplice, was also captured in Dubai in 2026. Kinahan's UAE residency visa was reported to have been cancelled in late August 2026, with data on Emirate government portals indicating he must leave the country by 29 September 2026.

== See also ==
- Thomas Kavanagh
