= Murder of Elaine O'Hara =

2012 murder of Irish woman

Elaine O'Hara
- Born: 17 March 1976; Dublin, Ireland
- Died: c. 22 August 2012 (aged 36)

Elaine O'Hara (17 March 1976 – c. 22 August 2012) was an Irish childcare worker who was murdered in August 2012 by architect Graham Dwyer. She was last seen alive at a public park in Shanganagh, Dublin, Ireland, on 22 August. The remains of her body were discovered on Killakee Mountain, south of Dublin, in September 2013. The investigation of her disappearance and later of her death was widely reported.

The 2015 trial and conviction of Dwyer led to the circulation of evidence concerning O'Hara's and Dwyer's involvement in the BDSM sexual subculture. The evidence of Dwyer's sadistic sexual practices led to the murder being called one of the most shocking crimes in Irish history.

A subsequent appeal by Dwyer, which questioned the legal basis for retaining the mobile phone metadata (which was used in the prosecution case against him), was upheld by the Court of Justice of the European Union (CJEU). The outcome of this decision was described as having potentially "serious implications for the investigation of serious crime across Europe", and provided a basis for further appeal by Dwyer. Dwyer lost several appeals, in both the Court of Appeal and subsequently the Supreme Court, with the latter unanimously ruling that the evidence derived from mobile phone data was admissible at his original trial.

== Background ==
Elaine O'Hara was born in Dublin on 17 March 1976 and was educated in St. Joseph of Cluny secondary school. She had been bullied at school. She had many mental health issues from her teens, and was regularly hospitalised for psychiatric care. She had been treated by Professor Anthony Clare, who diagnosed depression and borderline personality disorder. She also had asthma, diabetes, and dyslexia. Her mother's death in 2002 was a major setback for her, as was the sudden death of Professor Clare in 2007.

In 2005, she moved out of her family home in Killiney to a flat in Blackrock. In 2008, she moved to another flat in Blackrock, before acquiring an affordable housing unit in Belarmine Plaza, Stepaside. O'Hara worked as a childcare assistant in Ballybrack and part-time in a newsagents in Blackrock. She was taking night classes in the town of Dún Laoghaire with the hopes of becoming a Montessori teacher.

=== Disappearance ===
O'Hara went missing from her home on 22 August 2012, and it was initially assumed she had disappeared while volunteering at the 2012 Tall Ships' Races. Inside her house, however, she had left her bag, purse, and mobile phone, and security footage showed her leaving her home with a different phone. She was last seen by a jogger in Shanganagh Park in the county of Dún Laoghaire–Rathdown just to the south of Shankill. It was later determined that she had gone to Shanganagh Cemetery, where her mother was buried. A woman was heard crying loudly in the graveyard by a witness. The witness saw the woman, fitting O'Hara's general description, crying beside an old grave, but could not positively identify her as O'Hara. Her car was later found nearby, and it was assumed she had, given her psychological history, committed suicide by jumping off the nearby cliffs.

=== Discovery of evidence ===
On 10 September 2013, three days before the eventual discovery of O'Hara's body, anglers William Fegan, his brother, and another man spotted a bag lying in the water in Vartry Reservoir, near Roundwood, County Wicklow. Normally, the depth of water at the bridge where evidence was found was 15 feet (4.6 m) to 20 feet (6.1 m), but in 2013, following a long hot period, it was as shallow as 12 inches (30 cm) to 18 inches (46 cm), exposing the items that would have otherwise been beneath the surface. Inside the bag they found handcuffs, clothing, a ball gag, restraints, and leg restraints.

The following day, Fegan handed the items he had found in to Roundwood Garda station. Garda James O'Donoghue conducted several further searches at the scene and on 16 September found handcuffs, keys, a leather mask, a knife, an inhaler and a chain with a ring on it. A Dunnes Stores loyalty card found attached to the keyring was identified as belonging to O'Hara. The Garda Water Unit searched the lake on 17 September and 7 October 2013, finding two Nokia mobile phones, two mobile phone batteries, a pair of glasses and sunglasses, and a rucksack. A number on the frame of the glasses and the prescription matched the records for O'Hara held on file at a branch of Specsavers in Dún Laoghaire.

=== Discovery of body ===
Dog trainer Magali Vergnet regularly walked dogs on wooded land near Kilakee in the foothills of the Dublin Mountains. Starting on 21 August 2013, one of her dogs would regularly disappear and return with some bones during their walk, which Vergnet at first believed were from an animal. On 13 September 2013, the same dog again retrieved more bones, this time accompanied by clothing. Concerned that these might be human, she contacted the landowner, Frank Doyle. They returned to the land with another man and within an isolated clearing, they found scattered and gnawed bones, including the remains of a rib-cage and jawbone. Realizing the remains were human, they contacted the Gardaí. Only 65 per cent of her skeleton was recovered. O'Hara's body was later identified through dental records.

== Investigation ==
Police discovered that in late 2007, O'Hara had visited fetish adult sex website Alt.com under the profile name helpmelearn36/F and viewed the profile of architect72, which was linked to a Gmail address named fetishboy. Police linked these to Graham Dwyer, an architect. Evidence emerged that Dwyer and O'Hara had embarked on a sexual relationship that involved bondage, violence and knives. The relationship was very intense throughout 2008. Violent homemade sex videos and fragments of emails were retrieved from their laptops.

Their relationship dwindled, but was rekindled in March 2011 when Dwyer contacted O'Hara through a prepaid mobile phone. Dwyer had a mobile phone number which began with 083, and both he and O'Hara had mobile phones with numbers that began 086. Recovered texts, from the discarded, but still operational Nokia phones, sent by Dwyer (under the name "Master") to O'Hara (as "Slave") during this period included:

I want to stick my knife in flesh while I am sexually aroused… I would like to stab a girl to death some time.

— Graham Dwyer, Text from 083 phone, June 2011

My urge to rape, stab or kill is huge. You have to help me control or satisfy it.

— Graham Dwyer, Text from 083 phone, 2011

Dwyer did not have a history of criminality. His background suggested "nothing of note". Born on 13 September 1972 in Bandon, County Cork, to Sean and Susan Dwyer, he has three siblings. After completing secondary school, he moved to Dublin in the early 1990s. He studied architecture at Dublin Institute of Technology, Bolton Street, where he began a relationship with Donegal woman Emer McShea. McShea soon became pregnant with a son. However, McShea later testified in court that he once confided to her that he fantasized about stabbing a woman during sex, and he started to bring a kitchen knife in to their bedroom, pretending to stab her. McShea and Dwyer finished their relationship in 1996 and a year later he began dating fellow architecture student Gemma Healy. They were married in Sligo Cathedral in 2002 and five years later they moved to Kerrymount Close, Foxrock. Dwyer's architecture career took off and he started work for A&D Wejchert & Partners Architects on Lower Baggot Street on 2 July 2001.

He was named a director in June 2006 and was involved in a range of major developments in Ireland, including Carlow Institute of Technology, Leopardstown racecourse, and in Poland. His hobbies included flying radio-controlled aircraft and driving luxury cars, while his wife Gemma enjoyed sailing. However, according to information disclosed during Garda interviews, Dwyer's finances were in difficulty at the time of the murder: "I was deeply in debt. We had good prospects in 2007. We had a cottage in Rathmines, bought the house in Foxrock to renovate. Then the crash happened. Gemma lost her job and I had huge pay cuts", he had said. His trial had heard directors at the firm had suffered a 50% pay cut since 2009, including a 21% cut in the first six months of 2011, cutting his wages to €70,000.

== Arrest and trial ==
Evidence from O'Hara's phone and laptop led to warrants to search Dwyer's house, where further evidence was discovered. He was arrested, and initially denied knowing O'Hara (which was disproven by security footage at O'Hara's home, and the presence of semen in her bed), and later denied murdering O'Hara. The trial opened on 22 January 2015. At the trial, the violent homemade sex videos and retrieved fragments of emails provided evidence of the sexual use of bondage, violence and knives. Numerous messages from O'Hara referred to Dwyer's repeated threats to stab and kill her.

Dwyer's defense counsel Remy Farrell argued that there was no evidence tying Dwyer to O'Hara's death. O'Hara had a history of depression and her cause of death had never been determined by pathologists. She had recently been released from a psychiatric hospital which she had entered after having suicidal thoughts. There was "not a screed of evidence in respect of the cause of death", or even evidence that it was murder. According to Farrell, both the police and her own family had first believed that she most probably committed suicide. O'Hara's interest in the BDSM lifestyle had been known to the police since before the discovery of her body, and there were many circumstances that could have led to her death. Farrell said that the violent language used by Dwyer in his texts was proof of nothing more than his sexual fantasies.

Seán Guerin SC, prosecuting, said that the accumulated evidence pointed to a detailed plan by Dwyer to commit and get away with murder. Dwyer had used O'Hara's low self-esteem to manipulate her. His desire to kill a woman was well-documented in his texts. O'Hara was not a willing participant in sexual violence; she repeatedly expressed her wish "not to be stabbed" and "not to be beaten" by him. She only wanted "companionship, love and ultimately a child". Knowing she had recently been released from a psychiatric hospital, Dwyer had lured her to the cemetery intending to take her to the mountains and kill her, expecting that if her body was discovered, her death would be deemed to have been suicide. But the attempt to conceal his relationship with her by hiding the mobile phones and O'Hara's personal effects was clear evidence of intent.

On 27 March 2015, Dwyer was convicted in a unanimous verdict. Sentencing him to life imprisonment, the judge Tony Hunt stated that he "110% agreed" with jury's decision. The jury was exempted from jury duty for 30 years.

== Appeal and implications ==
During and after the trial, Dwyer's legal team highlighted that the legislation covering the capture and use of the mobile phone data (relied upon by the prosecution in the trial) was invalid. Specifically, Dwyer's legal team claimed a grounds for appeal on the basis that Ireland's Communications (Retention of Data) Act 2011, in turn giving effect to the European Data Retention Directive (2006/24/EC), was invalid - because the underlying European Directive had been struck down by the European Court of Justice in 2014. These claims contributed to a review of how state agencies use the type of data covered by the legislation. If upheld, it was reported that the appeal would impact the admissibility of the mobile phone evidence in the Dwyer case - and other cases which rely upon mobile phone data in Garda investigations.

In late 2021, an adviser reviewing the case on behalf of the Court of Justice of the European Union (CJEU) issued an opinion that the retention of mobile phone metadata was "permitted only in the event of a threat to national security", and not for the investigation of crimes. It was reported that such a ruling would have "serious implications for the investigation of serious crime across Europe". In April 2022, the CJEU ruled that the "indiscriminate retention of mobile phone metadata" was not consistent with EU law, setting the basis for the Court of Appeal in Ireland to determine whether the related evidence was admissible in Dwyer's original trial. As of late June 2022, the Irish government was considering emergency legislation to "deal with the fallout" from Dwyer's appeal and the CJEU ruling. In March 2023, Dwyer's appeal was dismissed by the Court of Appeal.

In July 2024, the Supreme Court unanimously ruled that the mobile phone data evidence was admissible at the original trial. As Ireland's court of final appeal, the Supreme Court decision meant that, as of July 2024, Dwyer had "exhausted all his legal options and will continue to serve his life sentence".

== See also ==
- Lists of solved missing person cases
