= Imre Arakas =

Estonian criminal

- Born: c. 1958 (age 67–68); Estonia
- Other name: the Butcher
- Status: in prison
- Criminal charge: conspiracy to murder
- Penalty: six years

Details
- Imprisoned at: Portlaoise Prison

Imre Arakas, also known as The Butcher, is an Estonian criminal. He has also been a wrestler, an actor and an Estonian separatist. He is a father of two.

== Criminal career ==
=== Soviet era ===
In 1977 he and another accomplice broke into the Tallinn lifeguard station's slipway and stole a rubber engine powered rowing boat.

He tried to escape abroad from the Soviet Union with a boat, but it had a engine failure. The wind and waves blew him back to shore.

With an accomplice, he stole a boat engine from the Dünamo sport complex. They also broke into the Tallinn Conservatory and stole two stereo tape recorders with speakers.

In 1978 they stole a boat engine from the Kalevi yachtclub harbour, a uniform jacket and maps from a vehicle inspectors car. They also stole tape recorders, microphones and dictionaries from the Tallinn 46. Secondary school. They also stole several cars.

Imre bought a gun and had several weapons and revolvers. He stabbed 2 people, one of whom gained life threatening injuries.

In 1978 he broke into the Estonian Television building and threatened a guard with a gun and demanded the guard to give up his weapon.

In 1979, aged twenty, he and Heiki Terras broke into a shooting club in Tallinn and stole 13 handguns and hundreds of rounds of ammunition. Some saw the theft as a blow against the Soviet regime. Arakas was quickly arrested, but escaped from a courthouse on 18 April 1979, evading authorities by jumping from the Kohtuotsa viewing platform on Toompea hill. He was arrested again after 87 days, all of his possessions were taken by the state and he was sentenced to 15 years in jail. 3 of those years were spent in ordinary prison and 12 years in a corrective labour colony.

In April of 2026, a rehabilitation petition was filed with the Supreme Court of Estonia. In November of 2026, the Supreme Court of Estonia partially rehabilitated him. The crimes committed during the Soviet era were overturned because they were found to be a struggle for freedom against the occupying regime. The only exception was for stealing 2 umbrellas from a car, which could not be linked to a struggle against the occupiers. The case files of his arrest showed indication of a will to fight the Soviet Union. Another applicant who also asked for rehabilitation in 2026, who partook in breaking into the shooting club, was rejected because his case files did not indicate any desire to fight the Soviet Union.

=== Post Soviet crime in Estonia ===
After release from prison he joined an Estonian organised crime gang and took part in a feud with Russian organised crime that killed over a hundred people. Arakas was nearly killed on more than one occasion.

=== Spain ===
He left Estonia for Spain in 1998. A failed assassination attempt was made in Marbella and two Estonians were jailed for their part in it.

After this he became a freelance professional killer who is suspected of being responsible for a number of murders across Europe.

=== Ireland ===
He was employed by the Kinahan gang as part of the Kinahan-Hutch feud. He was hired to kill James "Mago" Gately. Arakas owed a lot of money and the €100,000 payment for murdering Gately would pay off a large amount of it. The Gardaí received intelligence that he was going to arrive in Ireland and put him under surveillance. The assassination was prevented and in 2018, he was jailed for six years by the Special Criminal Court. While in Mountjoy Prison he suffered a stroke.

=== Charges in Lithuania ===
He is expected to be deported to Lithuania after release from prison where he faces murder charges. He is a suspect in the murder of Deimantas Bugavičius, lover of Lithuanian pop star Vita Jakutienė, on 6 November 2015. The victim was shot by a three-man gang. In June 2020 he announced that he would challenge the extradition. He was deported to Lithuania in 2023 where he was being held on murder charges.
