= Murder of Ashling Murphy =

2022 murder in County Offaly, Ireland

- Murphy in 2021
- Date: 12 January 2022
- Time: 3:21 pm (GMT)
- Location: Tullamore, County Offaly, Ireland; 53.27868°N 7.48010°W
- Convicted: Jozef Puška
- Trial: Central Criminal Court, Dublin, 16 October – 9 November 2023
- Sentence: Life imprisonment, with a non-parole period of 12 years

On 12 January 2022, Ashling Murphy, a 23‑year‑old Irish primary school teacher, traditional musician, and camogie player, was murdered while walking along the Grand Canal towpath near Tullamore, County Offaly. Her killing prompted widespread public grief and outrage, and tens of thousands attended vigils across Ireland and internationally. President Michael D. Higgins, Taoiseach Micheál Martin, and other government ministers attended her funeral.

A week after Murphy's death, Jozef Puška, a 31-year-old Slovak Romani who had moved to Ireland in 2013, was charged with her murder. In November 2023, following a high-profile three-week trial at Dublin's Central Criminal Court, Puška was convicted and sentenced to life imprisonment. In June 2025, Puška's wife, his two brothers, and their wives were convicted of withholding information or destroying evidence; they all received custodial sentences ranging from 20 to 30 months. Separately, Murphy's boyfriend brought a defamation action against the BBC over comments made in a current‑affairs broadcast; the case was settled out of court.

Murphy's legacy has been marked through scholarships, renamed camogie trophies, and a permanent memorial at the site of her death. Her family also established the Ashling Murphy Memorial Fund to support traditional Irish arts and culture for young people. Her murder accelerated legislative efforts aimed at improving women's safety.

== Murder ==
=== Victim ===
Born on 6 July 1998, Ashling Murphy was the youngest of three children; she had an older brother and sister. She grew up near Blue Ball, County Offaly, around 10 km (6.2 mi) southwest of Tullamore. From 2011 to 2017, she studied at Sacred Heart School, a Catholic girls' secondary school in Tullamore. She then attended Mary Immaculate College in Limerick, graduating in October 2021 with a Bachelor of Education degree in Primary Teaching. In March 2021, she began working as a substitute teacher at Scoil Naomh Colmcille, a primary school in Durrow, County Offaly, around 8 km (5.0 mi) northwest of Tullamore. She secured a full-time position at the school, beginning in September 2021, where she taught first-class pupils.

Murphy's family all played traditional Irish music; her father had performed with The Fureys and with the band Best Foot Forward. Regarded as a talented fiddle player, Murphy performed around the country with the national orchestra of Comhaltas Ceoltóirí Éireann, featured at traditional music festivals, and gave private music lessons at her family home. She played camogie for her local Kilcormac–Killoughey GAA club and represented Mary Immaculate College at collegiate level. She and her boyfriend Ryan Casey were in a relationship for over five years and had planned to marry.

=== Attack and death ===
At 2:30 pm on 12 January 2022, Murphy finished work at Scoil Naomh Colmcille in Durrow. She was captured on the school's CCTV at 2:37 pm while walking to her car, a red SEAT Córdoba, in which she drove via the N52 to the Daingean Road car park in Tullamore, close to the Grand Canal. She left the car park on foot, wearing a navy jacket, navy leggings, a Kilcormac–Killoughey GAA camogie top, a white T-shirt, a gray scarf, blue Nike runners, and a pink woolen hat with a brown bobble. She also wore a ring, sunglasses, a gold necklace bearing the name "Ashling", and a Fitbit Versa 3 smartwatch with an activity tracker linked to her smartphone. Geolocation and activity data retrieved from her devices showed that she began walking at 2:51 pm, heading eastward along the canal in the direction of Digby Bridge. She was last captured on CCTV at 2:55 pm.

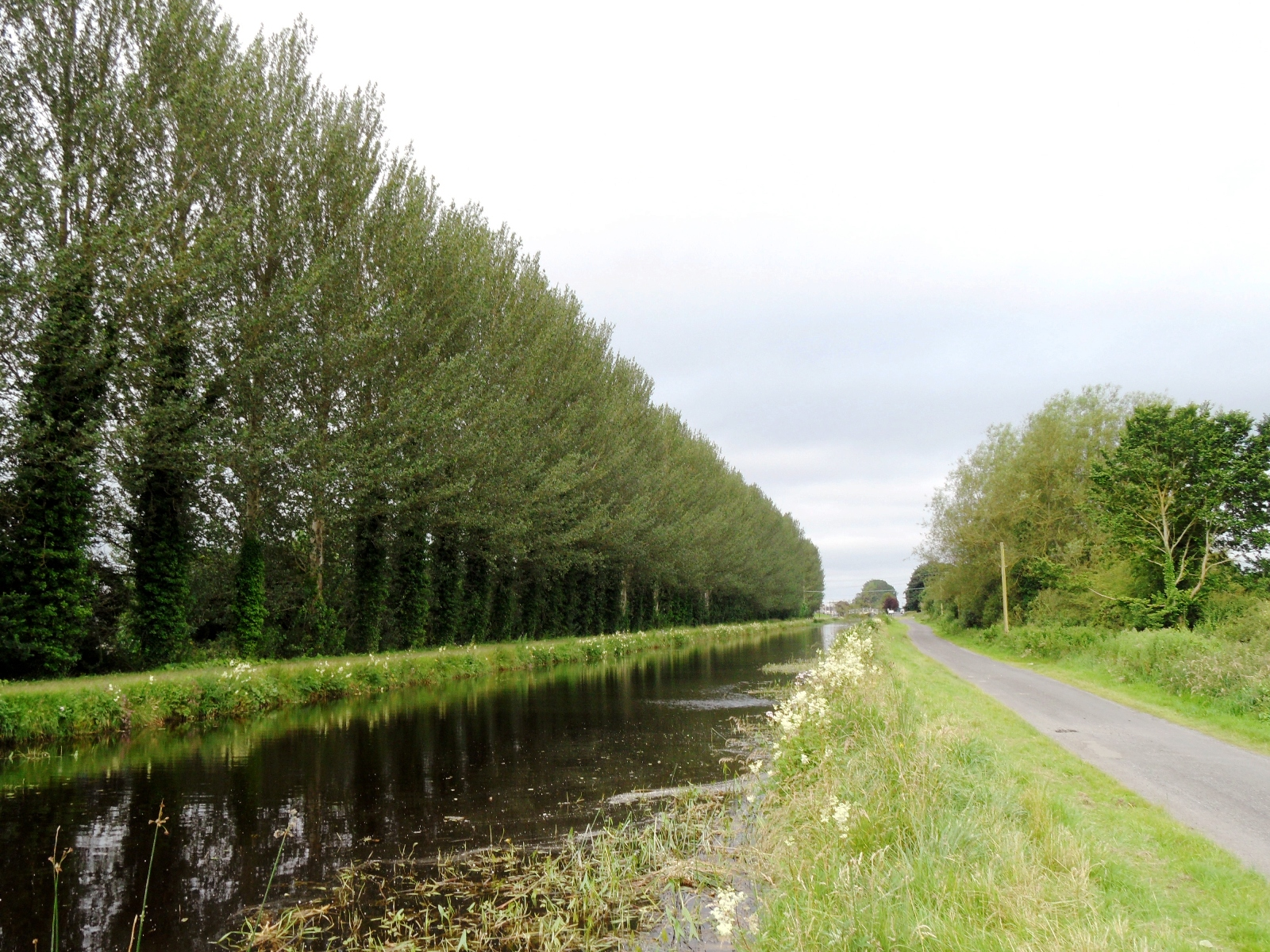
The Grand Canal in Tullamore, near where Murphy was killed.

Geolocation data from Murphy's devices showed that she walked eastward as far as Digby Bridge, crossed the bridge at 3:16 pm, and then headed westward back towards the Daingean Road car park. The data showed her walking briskly at a consistent pace of around 6.5 km (4.0 mi) per hour until 3:21 pm, at which point her forward movement stopped and her activity tracker began recording erratic fluctuations consistent with a violent attack. Her attacker is believed to have overpowered her and dragged her off the towpath into an adjacent steep ditch filled with briars, where he stabbed her 11 times in the neck and also inflicted a single incision across her neck. He is believed to have used a serrated knife, although the murder weapon has never been found. Murphy's activity tracker recorded her heart rate decreasing rapidly until 3:27 pm and ceased recording a heartbeat at 3:31 pm.

Two joggers, Jenna Stack and Aoife Marron, also primary school teachers, witnessed the attack. They later testified that they noticed a mountain bike in a hedge alongside the towpath and heard loud rustling sounds in the ditch beneath. Believing that someone may have fallen off the bike, Marron shouted: "Are you okay? Do you need help?" Stack stepped off the towpath, looked through the hedge into the ditch, and saw a man crouching over a woman and holding her down in the undergrowth. Stack stated that she could not see the woman's upper body but observed her legs kicking vigorously in a scissors-like motion, which she interpreted as a cry for help. Stack called out to the man "What are you doing?” and he shouted "Get away." Believing that he was attempting to rape the woman, Stack shouted at him to "Get off her" and said she was calling the Gardaí. Stack and Marron then ran for help, as neither was carrying a phone.

At Digby Bridge, Stack and Marron encountered two cyclists and two Waterways Ireland workers. The cyclists rode to the location indicated by the women. One of the cyclists noticed the mountain bike in the hedge and discovered Murphy's motionless body on her back in the adjacent ditch, her face covered with matted hair and blood. The Waterways Ireland workers went to the scene on foot and also saw Murphy's body. One of the workers later testified that her hand was "snow white," which he took as an indication that she was dead.

=== Response by emergency services ===
The cyclist who discovered Murphy's body phoned Tullamore Garda Station at 3:34 pm. Two Gardaí arrived at the scene ten minutes later. A Garda entered the ditch wearing disposable gloves, unzipped Murphy's jacket, and began performing CPR on her. He and his Garda colleague alternated performing CPR for over ten minutes, during which time a number of Garda detectives arrived. Two paramedics, Paul McCabe and a colleague, reached the scene at 3:56 pm. The paramedics and Gardaí moved Murphy's body out of the ditch and onto the canal towpath, to facilitate attempts at resuscitation. McCabe later testified that he observed a substantial number of wounds on the right side of Murphy's neck as she was being moved.

McCabe attempted to use a defibrillator after Murphy's body was placed on the towpath, but a monitor showed that she was in a "non-shockable rhythm" with "no signs of life." From his analysis of her condition— she had no pulse, had pale and cold skin, and had dilated and fixed pupils— McCabe concluded that Murphy was already dead. After a discussion with the other paramedic and the Gardaí, he ceased resuscitation efforts and covered her body with a blanket. The area was declared a crime scene at 5:34 pm. Murphy's brother identified her body, and a doctor officially pronounced her dead at 5:51 pm. Members of the Garda Technical Bureau arrived at 7:08 pm.

Murphy's body was removed to the Midland Regional Hospital, Tullamore, where state pathologist Dr. Sally Anne Collis carried out a postmortem examination the following day, January 13. Collis reported examining a 1.61 metre (5 feet 3 inch) tall female, weighing 52.7 kilograms (116 lb), who had sustained 11 stab wounds to the right side of her neck, which had severed her left and right jugular veins and her right carotid artery. The stab wounds had also damaged her voice box, leaving her unable to speak or make any intelligible sound. Collis additionally noted a longer incised wound across Murphy's neck. Although the media initially reported that Murphy died from strangulation, Collis confirmed that she died from cardio-respiratory arrest following acute blood loss. Collis noted that Murphy had suffered defensive injuries to her hands as well as additional abrasions and bruises to her body.

=== Public reactions ===
People across Ireland responded with shock and grief to the news of Murphy's murder. In Tullamore, thousands of mourners attended a vigil in a local park, many carrying flowers and candles. Numerous other vigils took place throughout the country, in locations including Dublin, Galway, Belfast, Limerick, Cork, Waterford, Kilkenny, Navan, Maynooth, Drogheda, Sligo, Ballina, Derry, Omagh, and Armagh. Murphy's family attended a candlelit vigil near the murder scene, where her father and his Best Foot Forward bandmates played her favourite song, "When You Were Sweet Sixteen." Vigils were also held internationally in cities including London, New York, Toronto, Vancouver, Melbourne, Brisbane, Dubai, Glasgow, and Edinburgh. Tens of thousands of people attended vigils throughout Ireland and abroad.

The President of Ireland, Michael D. Higgins, expressed his "profound sympathy and sorrow and sense of loss" at Murphy's death and paid tribute to her "short but brilliant and generous life." The Taoiseach, Micheál Martin, said "the entire country is devastated and shocked by the violent and barbaric killing" and said the murder had "united the nation in solidarity and revulsion." Describing Murphy as "an inspiration", the principal of Scoil Naomh Colmcille said that the school community was "devastated and numb" at her killing.

Murphy's murder gave rise to widespread anger and outrage over women's safety. Women posted their experiences of gender-related violence and misogyny on social media following Murphy's death, leading to intense online debates. Calling the killing "every woman and family's worst nightmare", the Minister for Justice, Helen McEntee, promised a zero tolerance approach to violence against women. She pledged to introduce new laws to keep women safe and promised to increase state funding for women’s shelters. Murphy's death accelerated the implementation of a €363 million, five-year government strategy to address domestic, sexual, and gender-based violence.

=== Funeral ===
Murphy's wake was held at her family home near Blue Ball on 16 and 17 January. Her Requiem Mass took place at 11:00 am on 18 January at St. Brigid's Church, Mountbolus, County Offaly, with burial afterwards in Lowertown Cemetery, Mountbolus. Large crowds gathered in the village and outside the church for her funeral. Public figures in attendance included the President of Ireland, Michael D. Higgins, the Taoiseach, Micheál Martin, the Minister for Justice, Helen McEntee, the Minister for Education, Norma Foley, and the Minister for the Arts, Catherine Martin. Schools and colleges around the country observed a minute's silence at 11:00 am in her memory. Her former pupils from Scoil Naomh Colmcille formed a guard of honour outside the church, each holding a photograph of her and a red rose. The Kilcormac–Killoughey GAA senior camogie team also formed a guard of honour, while musicians who were friends or colleagues of Murphy played traditional Irish music at the Mass and at her graveside. Her funeral was streamed to the local community centre and to a large screen at the local GAA pitch; it was also streamed over the Internet.

At the Requiem Mass, Murphy's cousins did readings and said prayers of the faithful. Her godparents brought to the altar items to symbolise her life, including a musical instrument, a camogie stick and Kilcormac–Killoughey GAA jersey, a family photo, and a schoolbook. Describing Murphy as "a woman who lived the short years given to her to the full", Bishop Tom Deenihan of Meath called her death "a depraved act of violence" but said it had "united the country in grief and support.” In his homily, local parish priest Fr. Michael Meade told Murphy's family that they had "been robbed of [their] most precious gift." At her graveside, her boyfriend Ryan Casey said "she will always be my soulmate". During their royal visit to Ireland in March 2022, Charles III (then Prince Charles) and Queen Camilla (then Camilla, Duchess of Cornwall) met with Murphy's family and boyfriend to express their condolences.

=== Commemorations and legacy ===
In January 2023, shortly before the first anniversary of her death, Murphy's family established the Ashling Murphy Memorial Fund, a registered charity that supports the traditional Irish arts, culture, and heritage for young people. Mary Immaculate College and the Irish National Teachers' Organisation jointly established the Ashling Murphy Memorial Entrance Scholarship, awarded annually to a first-year Bachelor of Education student who exhibits exceptional achievement and talent in traditional Irish music. Comhaltas Ceoltóirí Éireann established three scholarships in Murphy's memory, one to support artists working in traditional arts, another to support musical education for young people, and a third to support research into Irish traditional arts. The Camogie Association renamed its collegiate Division 5 cup the Ashling Murphy Cup as "a celebration of Ashling’s life, her achievements and the sport she played and loved." Offaly Camogie renamed its Division 1 cup the Ashling Murphy Memorial Cup. A permanent memorial to Murphy has been constructed on the canal bank at Cappincur, at the site of her killing. Commemorative masses and walks have been held to mark the anniversaries of her death.

== Investigation and arrest ==
Following Murphy's death, Gardaí established an incident room at Tullamore Garda Station. Over 50 Gardaí, as well as personnel from specialist units including the National Bureau of Criminal Investigation, were assigned to the case. The murder investigation was jointly headed by Detective Superintendent Pat O'Callaghan and Detective Inspector Brian Farrell. Gardaí held a press conference at which they appealed for information, stating that they would leave no stone unturned in bringing the perpetrator to justice. Based partly on descriptions given by an eyewitness, Gardaí detained a 40-year-old man two hours after the murder, but released him the next day after eliminating him from their investigation. The man spoke to the Irish Independent on 15 January, recounting his experience of being interrogated by Gardaí and describing the online threats he had received since his arrest.

The day after the murder, Gardaí identified another suspect. On the late morning of 13 January, Gardaí and paramedics were called to an apartment in Crumlin, Dublin, where a Slovak national told them that he had been stabbed the previous day in Blanchardstown. The man had three stab wounds to his abdomen that were not fresh and not bleeding; he also had numerous scratches on his face and arms. Paramedics took him to St. James's Hospital, Dublin, for treatment. Gardaí who were investigating a double stabbing incident in Blanchardstown interviewed the man at the hospital that afternoon, initially regarding him as a potential third victim in that attack. In that interview, the man claimed that a friend had driven him the previous day from Tullamore to Dublin's Heuston Station. He claimed that he had taken a taxi to Blanchardstown, saying he had arranged to meet a woman there for a date, but claimed that two men had attacked him and stabbed him. He claimed that the scratches on his face, head, and arms had come from being dragged on the ground during the alleged assault.

Gardaí believed that the scratches on the man's arms and face— which they observed were consistent with having crawled through thick briars — were at odds with his story about an assault in Blanchardstown. They also noted inconsistencies in his accounts of his movements the previous day. Upon returning to Blanchardstown Garda Station, the Gardaí reported the interview to Detective Inspector Shane McCartan, who concluded that "There were a lot of pieces of a jigsaw puzzle that just couldn’t be put together, that just did not add up." Given that the man had travelled from Tullamore on the day of Murphy's murder, McCartan contacted colleagues at Tullamore Garda Station, who began regarding the man as a murder suspect. Two detectives travelled from Tullamore to interview the man at St. James's Hospital.

The man underwent surgery for his injuries on the night of 13 January, and the detectives were unable to speak with him until the following day. A Dublin Garda sergeant obtained a search warrant and joined the two detectives as they interviewed the man in a private room at St. James's Hospital on the evening of 14 January, with a Slovak interpreter translating via speakerphone. When one of the detectives informed the man that he was a person of interest in relation to Murphy's murder, he confessed to killing her, asking the interpreter to tell the detective "exactly what I tell you, that I did it, that I killed her but to tell him also that I did not do it intentionally, that I didn’t want to do it and that I’m very sorry I did it, that it happened." Gardaí cautioned the man that was not required to say anything, and offered to supply a solicitor, but he told them that he was confessing because he did not want anything bad to happen to his family. One detective wrote a note recording that the man said: “I did it. I murdered. I am the murderer.” Upset and crying, the man signed the note. Putting a finger to his lips, he told the other detective that he had asked Murphy to be quiet, and said, in English: "I tell her go, I won’t hurt you, when she pass, I cut her neck, she panic, I panic." The admission that he had cut Murphy's neck disclosed details of her death that were not then public knowledge, as the media had initially reported that Murphy died from strangulation. The man also admitted that the stab wounds to his abdomen were self-inflicted.

Gardaí searched two properties, one outside Tullamore and another in Dublin, and seized two cars. They obtained CCTV footage connecting the suspect to a distinctive black and green Falcon Storm mountain bike found at the crime scene and sought further information from the public about the bike. They also appealed for information about a man in the Tullamore area on 12 January wearing a black tracksuit with a white stripe or white writing on the bottoms. Anyone who had visited the area around Digby Bridge that morning or afternoon was asked to contact Gardaí.

The suspect was discharged from St. James's Hospital at 10:31 am on 18 January and immediately arrested. Gardaí took him to Tullamore Garda Station, where they obtained fingerprints, DNA samples, and blood samples before holding him at the station overnight. At 7:42 pm on 19 January, Gardaí charged the man with Murphy's murder and identified him publicly as 31-year-old Jozef Puška with an address in Mucklagh, a village around 5 km (3.1 mi) southwest of Tullamore. The same evening, Gardaí brought Puška before a special sitting of Tullamore District Court. An angry crowd of around 300 people gathered outside the courthouse and shouted obscenities at Puška as Gardaí escorted him to and from the building. Members of Murphy's family appeared in court and held up framed pictures of her. At the brief hearing, Gardaí gave evidence of the charges and a defence solicitor made applications for legal aid and for the services of an interpreter. Puška was remanded in custody at Cloverhill Prison.

Gardaí reviewed around 25,000 hours of CCTV footage to establish the respective movements of Puška and Murphy on the day of the murder. Using mobile device forensics, they retrieved data from Murphy's smartphone and Fitbit watch and used it to reconstruct her movements on the canal bank. Forensic evidence, including DNA and fingerprints, was also gathered at the crime scene and analyzed as part of the investigation.

=== Accused ===
A Slovak Romani, Jozef Puška was born in May 1990. He grew up in Lučivná, a ski resort village in the Poprad District of northern Slovakia, in the foothills of the High Tatra Mountains. After leaving school at age 16, he worked on construction sites in Bratislava and Prague. In 2013, he moved with his wife and two children to Ireland; his parents had previously moved to Crumlin, Dublin, and his brothers and their families to Tullamore. Puška and his family initially resided in Dublin's north inner city, where a third child was born; they relocated in 2015 to Tullamore, where two more children were born. At the time of the murder, Puška was sharing an address in Mucklagh, Co. Offaly, with his wife, his two brothers, their wives, and the three couples' combined 14 children. He had stopped working in 2017, due to a slipped disc in his back, and was receiving a social welfare disability allowance. Neither he nor his wife could drive, and he typically travelled by taxi, bus, or bicycle. He had no convictions for violent crime, but had previously been a person of interest in two assaults on women, one in Prague and the other in the UK. As a juvenile in Slovakia, he had been placed on probation for having sex with a girl younger than 15, which is the age of consent in that country.

== Trial ==
The Central Criminal Court originally set a date of 6 June 2023 for Puška's trial, although the trial was delayed as the prosecution required additional time to respond to an expert report from the defence. The trial began on 16 October 2023, with Mr. Justice Tony Hunt presiding over a jury of nine men and three women. Puška pleaded not guilty to murdering Murphy. In its pre-trial applications, the defence had sought to exclude CCTV evidence regarding Puška's movements on the day of the murder, on privacy grounds. It had also sought to exclude Puška's confession at St. James's Hospital, claiming he had been medically unfit to speak with Gardaí at that time. However, the judge ruled the evidence admissible, saying that the CCTV footage did not breach Puška's privacy rights and that Gardaí did not require a medical assessment before interviewing a criminal suspect.

The jury was shown CCTV footage recorded at 12:25 pm on 12 January 2022 as Puška was cycling from Mucklagh to Tullamore. The footage showed him wearing a black jacket and black tracksuit bottoms with a white stripe and a Tommy Hilfiger logo, and riding a Falcon Storm mountain bike with bright green forks. Gardaí gave evidence that Puška followed two other women in Tullamore that afternoon, prior to the attack on Murphy. CCTV evidence showed him cycling slowly behind one woman at around 1:38 pm as she walked along Church Road to the Tesco supermarket in the Tullamore Retail Park. He ceased following the woman after she entered the supermarket but began following another woman, Anne Marie Kelly, as she was walking her dog on Church Road at around 2:00 pm. Kelly testified that she had become aware of Puška following her and had tried to evade him by taking a route beside the Grand Canal, choosing the muddy, grassy side of the canal without a paved walkway in the hopes that he would not attempt to cycle there. However, Kelly testified that Puška had walked behind her while pushing his bike until she reached Digby Bridge, where other people were present. After that point, Kelly did not see Puška again. At the bridge, Kelly met a woman matching Murphy's description, who spoke to her in a friendly manner and petted her dog. Another local woman testified that she had been walking her dog on the canal towpath after 3:00 pm, shortly before the attack on Murphy, when she saw a man matching Puška's description cycling a mountain bike with bright green forks.

Witnesses testified in relation to what they observed during and after Murphy's murder. Gardaí and paramedics described the emergency services' response. Further witnesses testified that they had seen a man matching Puška's description walking on various roads in the area after 8:00 pm on the night of 12 January. Some witnesses described him as "crouching" or otherwise attempting not to be seen. The jury was shown CCTV footage of Puška at 9:14 pm, captured as he arrived on foot at the home of Rostislav Pokuta, a Slovak national who had lived in Tullamore since 2006. Pokuta knew Puška and his brothers through his job as a school bus driver, as he had transported their children to school. Pokuta testified that when Puška arrived at his home on the night of 12 January, his face was scratched and "almost blue", he was wet and shaking, and he seemed injured and scared. Puška claimed to have been hurt in a fight in Tullamore earlier that day, but would not give any details. Pokuta stated that Puška may have been holding his stomach, which the defence counsel stated was consistent with having suffered abdominal stab wounds earlier that day. Pokuta testified that he used his son's gray Volkswagen Golf car to drive Puška back to his home in Mucklagh that night. He confirmed that Puška had been wearing a black tracksuit with white lines on the side.

Puška had previously admitted to Gardaí that he changed clothing after returning home and asked another member of the household to burn the garments he had worn during the day. He was transported to Dublin later that night. The jury was shown CCTV footage showing Puška and his parents exiting a car outside his parents' apartment building in Crumlin at 12:58 am on 13 January. Gardaí and paramedics testified in relation to their encounter with Puška at the same apartment building on the late morning of 13 January and described their interviews with him at St. James's Hospital, including his confession to murder on the evening of 14 January.

The jury heard forensic evidence in relation to fingerprints and DNA. It was told that the mountain bike recovered at the crime scene had a fingerprint matching Puška's right ring finger on the underside of its saddle. A forensic scientist testified that he had taken swabs from the handlebars of the same mountain bike and developed a DNA profile, which he compared to a blood sample taken from Puška at St. James’s Hospital and a swab taken at Tullamore Garda Station. He testified that there was a one in a billion chance that the DNA found on the bike came from anyone other than the accused man. Another forensic scientist testified that she had received swabs taken from beneath Murphy's fingernails during the postmortem examination. After isolating male DNA from the sample by focusing on the Y chromosome, she found that the Y-STR profile generated from the fingernail swabs matched the Y-STR profile from Puška's blood sample and swabs. She stated that the chance of the DNA coming from someone unrelated to Puška was one in 14,000, based on a database of European ethnic groups. The prosecution argued that Murphy had Puška's DNA beneath her fingernails because she had tried to fight off her attacker by scratching him.

Speaking through a Slovak interpreter, Puška claimed in his defence that he had been cycling on the canal towpath when a man wearing dark clothing and a surgical mask shouted at him, pushed him off his bike, and stabbed him three times in the abdomen. He claimed that Murphy had appeared on the scene and spoken to the man, who stabbed her behind some bushes before running away towards the N52 flyover. Puška claimed that he had shouted at the man and tried to assist Murphy with her injuries by pulling up her scarf to cover the wounds on her neck. He claimed that he left the scene because he was afraid the man would come back, stating that he then crawled through briars into a ditch and remained there for several hours because he felt unwell. He claimed that he did not remember confessing to Murphy's murder, saying that he frequently suffered from memory problems. He denied that Murphy had scratched him in self-defence, claiming that she had been wearing gloves at the time.

The defence contested the validity of Puška's confession at St. James's Hospital on 14 January, noting that he had received a dose of oxycodone for pain relief 2 hours and 20 minutes before speaking with Gardaí. An expert witness for the defence, a doctor described as an accident and emergency and intensive care specialist, stated that Puška could have been experiencing side-effects of that drug, including confusion, hallucinations, and irrational thinking. He stated that it was questionable whether Puška had been medically fit to be interviewed on that occasion. An expert witness for the prosecution, a professor described as an internationally renowned expert in toxicology and pharmacology, stated that Puška's medical records from St. James's Hospital indicated the amount of each drug administered and the timing of dosages. Based on his analysis of these records, he stated that the only drug present in Puška's system during his 14 January interview would have been 8.25 mg of oxycodone, which he described as a low dose. Citing a study showing no effects on the mood or behaviour of people who had taken less than 10 mg of oxycodone, he stated that there was “no evidence to suggest [Puška's] admission was related to any drug”.

The prosecution's counsel reminded the jury that Puška had given multiple different accounts of the events of 12 January and had admitted lying to Gardaí on several occasions. She told the jury that Puška had "spun you an absolute, unequivocal structure of lies and mistruths, some of which I say are absolutely foul and contemptible". She claimed that the evidence against Puška— including CCTV evidence, forensic evidence, eyewitness accounts, and his own confession— was "overwhelming."

=== Verdict ===
On 9 November 2023, after a trial lasting over three weeks, the jury deliberated for two hours before returning a unanimous verdict of guilty. Mr. Justice Tony Hunt said that he was glad the jury did not waste any more time considering the "nonsense" Puška had offered in his defence. He stated that there would be a "day of reckoning" for Puška and said: "We have evil in this room. No doubt about that." The victim's immediate family and boyfriend had attended the trial each day, and Murphy's mother held up a photograph of her daughter during the judge's comments. Friends and family of Murphy applauded as the jury left the box.

Speaking outside court after the verdict, Murphy's brother thanked the jury for their "patience and resilience throughout this incredibly difficult process." Saying that his sister had been subjected to "incomprehensible violence", he stated: "The judicial process cannot bring our darling Ashling back, nor can it heal our wounds. But we are relieved that this verdict delivers justice. It is simply imperative that this vicious monster can never harm another woman again."

No motive for the murder was established during the trial. Murphy did not know Puška before the attack. Persistent rumours that she knew his children through her job as a teacher, and that he killed her in an act of revenge after she reported child welfare concerns to the child and family services agency Tusla, were debunked during the trial. Gardaí established that Puška had become active on dating apps in the weeks before the murder and had exchanged messages with up to eight women in the Midland region. Stating that he may have been targeting women for sexual assault, they speculated that he could have attacked Murphy with sexual motives but killed her when she fought back.

=== Sentencing and victim impact statements ===
On 17 November 2023, Mr. Justice Tony Hunt sentenced Puška to mandatory life imprisonment. Noting that Puška would be eligible for parole in 12 years, Hunt criticised the sentencing restrictions in Irish courts, giving his view that judges should be able to set minimum terms for life sentences, as they could in other jurisdictions.

A female Garda sergeant read out a victim impact statement written by Murphy's mother, saying: "As a parent, you want your child to go out into this world and live a full and meaningful life yet, being acutely aware of how fragile their safety is, wanting to protect them. I couldn't protect my darling Ashling, and now she is gone forever." The statement called Puška an "evil monster" and said "he should never see the light of day again."

In her statement, Murphy's sister recalled how the sisters often played music together at the family table. She said: "Music is not and will never be the same without Ashling. Our love for Irish music was intertwined with a special bond. We could read each other's mind when we played together." She continued: "Ashling's pink fiddle case now lies covered in dust. For me, this serves as the hardest and cruelest reminder we will never play together again and how fragile this life truly is." Speaking to Puška, she stated: "Ashling's last ten minutes on this earth must have felt like the longest ten minutes of her life." She said: "You stole her life, took her voice and robbed us of our family of five."

Murphy's boyfriend Ryan Casey recounted in his statement how he first met her at a local rugby club disco when they were both aged 15. He said they had planned to marry, build a home, and start a family. Speaking to Puška, he said: "Because of you, I lost my Ashling. I have lost everything I have ever wanted in life. I will never get to marry my soulmate or see her smile again." He also said to Puška: "You smirked, you smiled and showed zero remorse throughout this trial; that sums you up as the epitome of pure evil. You will never ever harm a woman again."

==== Defamation lawsuit ====
In his victim impact statement, Casey also said: "It just sickens me to the core that someone can come to this country, be fully supported in terms of social housing, social welfare, and free medical care for over ten years, never hold down a legitimate job and never once contribute to society in any way shape or form, and commit such a horrendous, evil act of incomprehensible violence." Claiming that "our country is heading down a very dangerous path and we will not be the last family," he added: "We have to, once and for all, start putting the safety of not only Irish people but everybody in this country who works hard, pays taxes, raises families and overall contributes to society, first." Appearing on the BBC Northern Ireland current affairs programme The View in November 2023, journalist Kitty Holland criticised these comments, calling them "incitement to hatred" and claiming that Casey was "being held up as a hero by the far right". In August 2024, Casey initiated legal action in the High Court, suing the BBC for defamation.

In July 2025, the BBC settled the case out of court, reportedly paying Casey substantial damages in addition to a six-figure sum in legal costs. In a statement read before the court, the BBC said it was "happy to clarify that it does not consider Ryan Casey to be a criminal or a racist or someone guilty of or attempting to incite hatred, or someone seeking to pose as a hero of the far right through his victim impact statement". Casey said afterwards that he had taken legal action "not solely out of anger, but out of a need for accountability and dignity for Ashling, for [himself], [their] families and for all victims, who deserve to have their voices heard without such harsh criticism or judgement." Casey added that he wished to honour his late girlfriend by advocating for increased safety measures and for a society "free of gaslighting, blacklisting or censorship".

=== Appeal ===
In April 2024, Puška was granted legal aid to appeal his conviction. His appeal hearing was scheduled for 23 April 2026, but was rescheduled for 15 July after Puška changed his barristers. On 10 July, the Court of Appeal was informed that Puška had abandoned his appeal.

=== Others convicted ===
On 13 June 2023, Gardaí arrested five other Slovak nationals, identified as Jozef Puška's wife, his two brothers, and their wives. All five appeared at Tullamore District Court the following day, facing charges connected to obstructing the murder investigation and prosecution. At Tullamore District Court on 20 December 2023, they were sent forward for trial at the Central Criminal Court.

The trial of Puška's brothers—Marek Puška, aged 36, and Ľubomír Puška Jr., aged 38—and their respective wives—Jozefína Grundzová, aged 32, and Viera Gažiová, aged 40—began on 20 May 2025, with Ms. Justice Caroline Biggs presiding over a jury of seven men and five women. The jury was told that, at the time of Murphy's murder, the three brothers were living with their respective wives and a combined 14 children at the same address in Mucklagh, Co. Offaly. It heard that when Gardaí interviewed Marek Puška and Ľubomír Puška Jr. two days after the murder, both men withheld the information that Jozef Puška had returned to that address visibly injured at around 9:30 pm on 12 January 2022, that he had admitted to "cutting", "killing", or "seriously injuring" a woman, and that he had travelled to Dublin later that night. It also heard that, at some time between 12 and 14 January, Grundzová and Gažiová had burned in the fireplace of their home the bloodstained clothing worn by Jozef Puška on 12 January, while knowing or believing him to have committed murder on that day.

On 17 June 2025, after deliberating for almost 14 hours, the jury found Marek Puška and Ľubomír Puška Jr. guilty by unanimous verdict of withholding information that they knew would be of material assistance to the investigation. It found Grundzová and Gažiová guilty by majority verdict of destroying evidence with the intent to impede a prosecution. Jozef Puška's wife, Lucia Ištóková, aged 36, had pleaded guilty in pre-trial hearings to withholding information, but her guilty plea was not made public until the trial of the other family members had concluded.

At sentencing on 22 October, the court heard victim impact statements from Ashling Murphy's sister and father (the latter read by a Garda detective). Ms. Justice Caroline Biggs imposed a headline sentence of 40 months' imprisonment but reduced it due to mitigating circumstances. She also suspended the sentences of Gažiová, Grundzová, and Ištóková for six months after accepting that women in Roma culture "did what they were told." Marek Puška and Ľubomír Puška Jr. are each serving 30 months, while Gažiová is serving 24 months, Grundzová 21 months, and Ištóková 20 months. The judge stated that care arrangements acceptable to Tusla had been put in place for their children.
