= Murder of Gareth Hutch =

2016 murder

Coordinates: 53.35337°N 6.25747°W

Gareth Hutch was shot dead in Dublin on Tuesday 24 May 2016. He was a nephew of Gerry Hutch. He was also a cousin of Gary Hutch and a nephew of Eddie Hutch Snr.

Shortly before he was shot, Gareth Hutch was issued with a Garda Information Message that there was a threat to his life.

== Before Shooting ==
Gareth Hutch had previously been charged with attempted armed robbery of a van carrying cash in Lucan, but was found not guilty.

His flat in Avondale House had previously been searched by the Gardaí investigating the shooting of David Byrne at the Regency Hotel.

He had been issued with a Garda Information Message telling him his life was in danger. Local councillor Noel Ring said he had spoken to Mr. Hutch about moving to a more secure flat. Mr. Hutch was concerned not only for his own safety but also for his sons'. He said that he did not want to be shot in front of his son.

== Shooting ==
He was shot as he stood next to his car outside the Avondale House Flats on North Cumberland Street on the morning of 24 May 2016. The two gunmen had trouble starting their getaway car, then fled on foot before getting into another vehicle nearby. Three to six shots were reported to have been fired. Two handguns were retrieved from the scene.

== Aftermath ==
=== Arrests ===
A man was arrested over the murder the same day as the shooting. The Irish Times reported that the man denied involvement with the murder, but approached Gardaí because he feared that he would be suspected of involvement after Gardaí searched his home.

Two women suspected of helping the attackers, one a relative of the suspect who fired the fatal shot, were arrested for questioning.

=== CCTV footage circulating on social media ===
A video clip of CCTV footage was circulating on social media less than twelve hours after the murder. A Garda inquiry is investigating the video clip and trying to discover if a Garda was responsible for it.

== Trial ==
A trial of three defendants before the Special Criminal Court began on 5 June 2018. The defendants pleaded not guilty.

In November 2018 the court found Johnathan Keogh, his sister Regina Keogh and Thomas Fox guilty of the murder. All three were sentenced to life imprisonment by presiding judge Tony Hunt. Johnathan Keogh was found to have fired the shots. Gardai were present around the court and the Garda Public Order Unit was present in the court but there were no incidents.

In December 2024 Thomas 'Nicky' McConnell was also found guilty of the murder.
