= Portlaoise Prison =

Maximum security prison in Ireland

Coordinates: 53.038°N 7.287°W

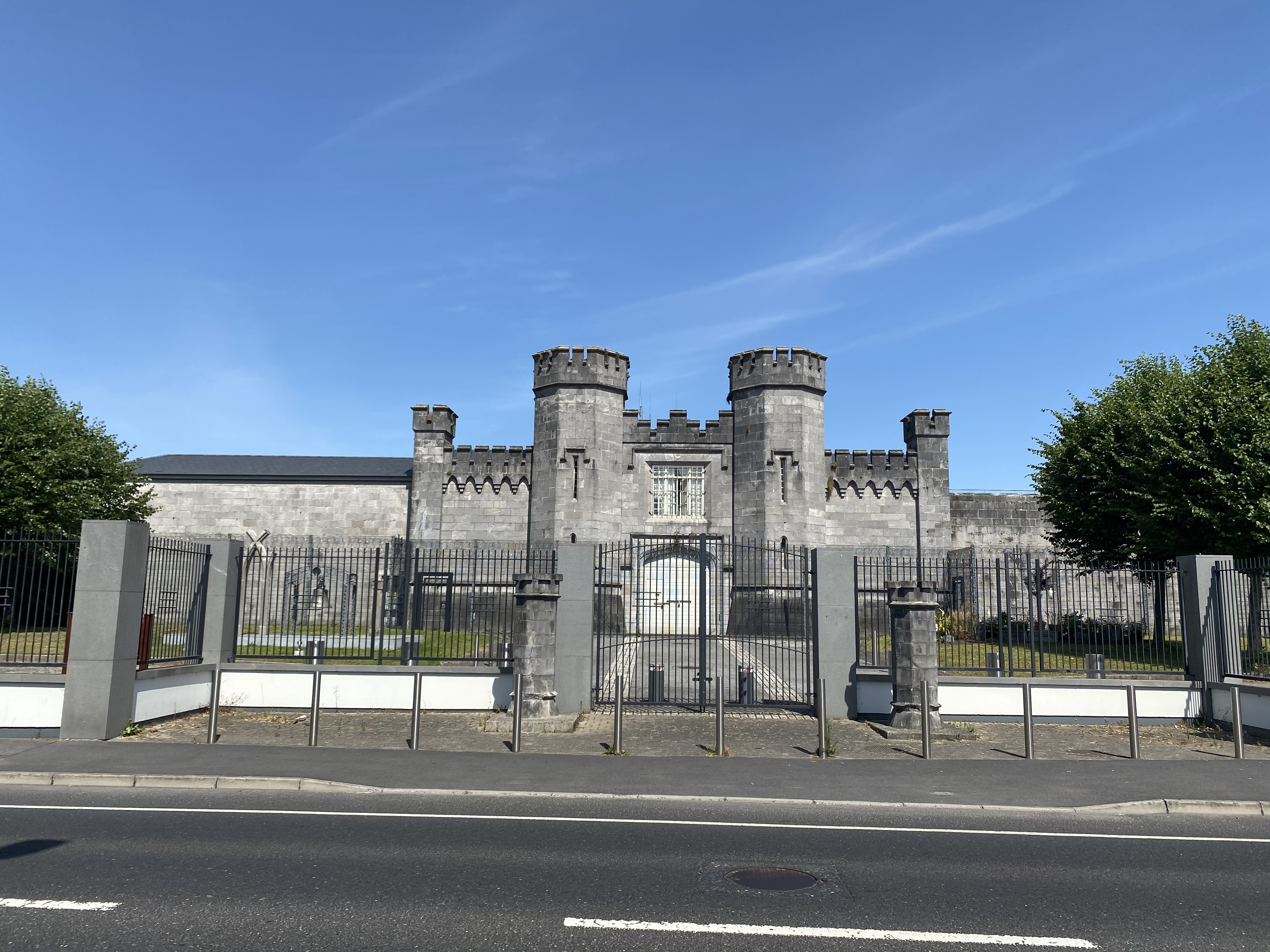
- Interactive map of Portlaoise Prison
- Location: Portlaoise, County Laois
- Status: Operational
- Security class: Maximum Security
- Capacity: 399
- Population: 119 (2009)
- Opened: 1830
- Managed by: Irish Prison Service
- Governor: Des O'Shea

Portlaoise Prison (Irish: Príosún Phort Laoise) is a maximum security prison in Portlaoise, County Laois, Ireland. Until 1929 it was called the Maryborough Gaol. It should not be confused with the Midlands Prison, which is a newer, medium security prison directly beside it; or with Dunamaise Arts Centre, which was the original Maryborough Gaol built c. 1789.

Portlaoise Prison was built in the 1830s, making it one of the oldest still operating today in the Irish prison system. It is the prison in which people convicted of membership of the Provisional Irish Republican Army (IRA) and other illegal paramilitary and designated terrorist organisations are usually detained.

A number of IRA and dissident republican prisoners are housed in "E Block". Anyone charged under section 30 of the Offences Against the State Act must be sent to the prison because of its unique security measures.

Soldiers from the Irish Army patrolled Portlaoise Prison on a permanent basis from 1973 until 2024.

== Security ==
Up until 2024, soldiers guarded the prison 24 hours a day. The security featured a detachment consisting of approximately platoon strength, armed with rifles and anti-aircraft machine guns, who patrolled the prison complex. In addition, an air exclusion zone operates over the entire complex. The perimeter consists of high walls, cameras and sensors.

The prison has a capacity for 399 prisoners, but because of the security-sensitive nature of its inmates, it operates below this capacity and its daily average number of resident inmates was only 119 in 2009.

== Escapes ==
In 1902, James Lynchehaun, who was in prison for the attempted murder of Agnes McDonnell, escaped unaided over the walls and made his way to America. The method of escape is documented in the book, The Playboy and the Yellow Lady and made headlines worldwide.

On August 18 1974, nineteen Irish Republican prisoners broke out on a Sunday afternoon after overpowering prison officers, jumping from the roof and then blowing holes in the wall – using explosives that had been smuggled in. A judicial inquiry was set up by Minister for Justice Patrick Cooney which led to an increased garda and military presence being deployed and harsher restrictions on prisoners.

On 29 December 1974, Provisional IRA prisoners held several prison officers hostage and caused considerable destruction to their wing in a protest for better living conditions inside the jail. Irish Army soldiers were used to regain control and the hostages were freed, all of them unharmed.

In 1975, during an attempted escape, Tom Smith of the IRA's Dublin Brigade was shot dead by the Irish Defence Forces. The prisoners had blasted their way through a door in the recreation area into the prison yard. As the prisoners entered the yard, Irish soldiers opened fire on the inmates, shooting Smith in the head.

In November 1985, an IRA mass breakout failed when a bomb, which had been assembled within the prison itself, failed to detonate at the prison gates.

== Controversy ==
In 1946 Seán McCaughey refused to wear prison clothes and spent nearly five years naked except for a blanket in protest against harsh conditions. He commenced a hunger strike on 19 April 1946. After 10 days, he stopped taking water and died on 11 May, the twenty-third day of his protest. An inquest was held in the prison at which the prison doctor admitted that during his four and a half years of imprisonment that McCaughey had never been allowed out in the fresh air or sunlight and that "he would not treat his dog the way Seán McCaughey had been treated in Portlaoise".

Following the escape of 19 prisoners in 1974, a judicial inquiry was set up by Justice Minister Patrick Cooney which led to an increased military presence being deployed in the prison and restrictions on food parcels and free association among the prisoners. The implementation of these measures resulted in deteriorating conditions in the prison over the following months leading eventually to two hunger strikes in 1975 and 1977.

In 1984 the assistant general secretary of the Prison Officers Association, Tom Hoare strongly criticised conditions within the prison stating that staff were forced by senior management in the prison to use excessive force against prisoners. He also criticised the then governor of Portlaoise Prison, William Reilly, and the minister of justice Michael Noonan stating "I accuse the minister of negligence in this area. I accuse the management of Portlaoise Prison of being indifferent to complaints. I would hate to be a prisoner making a complaint". At the Prison Officers Association 1984 conference a delegate from Portlaoise Prison, Larry O'Neill, told the conference: "If Hitler wanted generals today he would find plenty of them in Portlaoise. After the war the Nazis said many of them were doing their duty and that is what the management in Portlaoise are saying today".

Conditions within the prison improved after the death of Governor Reilly and the appointment of John Lonergan as Governor of the prison.

In May 2007, an inmate named John Daly, who was serving 9 years for armed robbery, called the RTÉ radio show Liveline from inside the prison. He called in to defend himself against Sunday World crime journalist Paul Williams who was speaking on the radio show at the time. Daly was on air for a few minutes before prison guards took the phone from him and ended the conversation.

This phone call resulted in a major clampdown in all Irish prisons and over 1,300 pieces of contraband being confiscated. Items confiscated in the cell-by-cell searches included numerous mobile phones, plasma televisions and even a budgie which was smuggled into the prison by a visitor who hid the bird internally in her vagina.

John Daly received many death threats from fellow inmates after calling the show and as a result was transferred to other prisons twice before his release in October 2007. A few weeks after his release, he was murdered in Finglas after a night out.

== Notable inmates ==
- Imre Arakas – Estonian criminal
- Martin Ferris – Irish former politician (born 1952)
- Angelo Fusco – Provisional Irish Republican Army member
- John Gilligan – Irish drug trafficker and mob boss
- Richard Goss – Irish Republican
- Gerry Hutch – Irish criminal (born 1963)
- Paul Magee – Provisional Irish Republican Army member
- James "Jim" McCann – Irish drug & arms trafficker (born 1939)
- Seán McCaughey – Irish militant and Republican activist
- Dominic McGlinchey – Irish republican (1954–1994)
- Michael McKevitt – Irish republican and paramilitary leader (1949–2021)
- Thomas Murphy – Irish republican (born 1949)
- Dessie O'Hare – Irish republican paramilitary (born 1956)
- George Plant – Irish Republican Army member
- Daniel Kinahan – Irish sports promoter and suspected crime boss (born 1977)

== See also ==
- Prisons in Ireland
