= Derek Hutch =

Irish criminal

Derek "Del Boy" Hutch is an Irish criminal and brother of Gary Hutch.

== Stolen motorcycle conviction ==
He was jailed for two years in 2009 after trying to sell a stolen motorbike to a Garda.

== Manslaughter conviction ==
Derek Hutch and an accomplice were convicted of the manslaughter of Barry McGuire on Saint Stephen's Day 2007 in Ashbourne, County Meath.

Hutch and Alan Donohue pleaded guilty of manslaughter of Barry McGuire and to intentionally or recklessly causing serious harm to Damien Carty on the same occasion.

Barry McGuire had died from a single knife wound after going to the aid of his friends who had got involved in an altercation with the defendants.

Initially both defendants had claimed to have been attacked and trying to dispose of the knives.

Derek Hutch had previously been jailed for firearms offences and had 39 previous convictions.

The sentences were backdated to 2009 when the defendants were taken into custody.

== Armed robbery conviction ==
In 2012 he was found guilty of coordinating an armed van raid at Foxborough Road, Lucan on 15 May 2009. During the raid Gardaí shot one of his accomplices dead. He was sentenced to sixteen years, which was backdated to 2009.

== Shooting of brother Gary ==
After his brother was shot dead on 24 September 2015 he was granted compassionate leave to view his brothers' body and pay respects at the family home. He was handcuffed to a prison officer at all times during this visit. He was not allowed to attend his brothers' funeral on grounds of security.

=== Attacks in prison ===
He was attacked in October and December 2015 in prison.

== Release ==
He was released from Wheatfield Prison on 31 July 2021.

== Dangerous driving ==
On 27 May 2022 he was riding his motorcycle when he hit a Ukrainian woman on Amiens Street. He had done a u-turn after spotting Gardaí shortly before the collision.

He was charged in October 2022 with driving under the influence of an intoxicant, dangerous driving causing severe bodily harm to a woman on 27 May 2022 and six counts of dangerous driving at Summerhill on the same date. Also known as "Derek Moore", he was to face his next hearing on 27 January 2023 with remaining charges to be heard the following July.
