= Hutch Organised Crime Gang =

Irish organised crime group

- Founded: 1980s
- Founded by: Gerry Hutch
- Founding location: Dublin, Ireland
- Years active: 1980s–present
- Territory: Republic of Ireland, Northern Ireland
- Criminal activities: drug trafficking, armed robberies, murder, money laundering
- Rivals: Kinahan Organised Crime Group

The Hutch Organised Crime Gang (HOCG), also known as the Hutch Gang, is a criminal organisation with a long history of illegal activities, primarily based in Ireland. Over the years, they have been involved in a range of criminal enterprises, including murders, drug trafficking, armed robberies, and property deals. The gang has operated in Ireland, Spain and the United Kingdom, amassing assets estimated to be as high as €20 million.

== History ==
The Hutch gang's criminal activities date back several decades, with their involvement in at least nine murders, some of which were linked to disputes and feuds with rival criminal organisations. They have been implicated in significant armed robberies, notably heists during the 1980s that were connected to Gerry Hutch, a prominent figure in the gang. Additionally, the gang is suspected of orchestrating the 2009 heist of the Bank of Ireland branch in central Dublin, resulting in the theft of millions of euros, most of which remains unrecovered.

The gang's involvement in the drug trade is notable, with allegations that they have financed drug gangs in both Ireland and the United Kingdom. This criminal organisation has been linked to numerous criminal activities, further complicating the law enforcement efforts to dismantle it.

== Members ==
Apart from Gerry Hutch, some known members are:

- Jason Hutch - a son of Gerry Hutch, he was extradited from Lanzarote on 10 September 2026 and arrested in relation to Serious Organised Crime offences. His arrest stems from an investigation by the National Bureau of Criminal Investigation.
- Gary Hutch – a nephew of Gerry Hutch, his murder on 24 September 2015 sparked the feud with the Kinahans.
- Derek Hutch – a brother of Gary Hutch, he was attacked in prison during the feud. He was released from prison in July 2021. On 27 March 2022, he was riding his motorcycle and hit a Ukrainian woman on Amiens Street.
- Eddie Hutch Snr – a brother of Gerry Hutch, he was mostly involved in fraud and shoplifting. He was shot dead on 8 February 2016 as part of the feud with the Kinahans.
- David Douglas – a former zookeeper and member of the Provisional IRA he was shot dead in July 2016 as part of the feud. He survived being shot the previous November. Freddie Thompson was convicted of his murder.
