= Jim Mansfield Jnr =

Irish businessman

Jim Mansfield Jnr is an Irish businessman who was convicted in January 2022 of attempting to pervert the course of justice in relation to the 9 June 2015 kidnapping of Martin Byrne.

== Early life ==
Mansfield Jnr and his two brothers, Tony and PJ are the sons of Jim Mansfield, a prominent Irish property developer and millionaire. Mansfield Jnr left school early, having had difficulty reading.

== Personal life ==
Mansfield Jnr married young and later separated from his wife.

Mansfield Jnr was in a relationship with the model Katy French before her death in December 2007.

== Business ==
His brother Tony took over the heavy equipment part of their father's business and Jim was more involved in other areas, such as the Citywest hotel and other facilities, Weston Airport, and a planned convention centre. Jim took on a major role, with PJ acting as assistant. Jim frequently worked with his father.

In 2015 he lost an appeal against a judgement order being granted against him in favour of Allied Irish Banks.

== Criminal conviction ==
=== Background ===
On 9 June 2015 Martin Byrne was kidnapped by Dessie O'Hare and Declan "Whacker" Duffy and five others. Byrne was a former employee of Jim. Byrne was taken to his family home in Saggart, where he was assaulted in front of his wife and son. They were also told to vacate their home.

=== Conviction ===
Jim Mansfield Jnr was convicted in January 2022 of attempting to pervert the course of justice by telling Patrick Byrne (brother of Martin) to destroy CCTV recordings which showed Martin and Mansfield leaving the Finnstown House Hotel on the morning of 9 June 2015. The recordings were not destroyed and were handed to the Garda Síochána. In February 2022 he was sentenced to two years imprisonment by the Special Criminal Court, with the final six months suspended. The sentence was backdated to 17 January 2022.
