= Murder of David Douglas =

2016 Irish gang shooting

Coordinates: 53.34359°N 6.28103°W

David "Daithí" Douglas, an Irish zookeeper turned criminal, was shot dead on 1 July 2016. He had convictions dating from the 1980s as well as more recent ones and had survived a shooting the previous November. His murder is part of the Hutch–Kinahan feud. In August 2018 'Fat' Freddie Thompson was found guilty of the murder by the Special Criminal Court.

== Criminal history ==
In 1983 Douglas received a sentence of twelve years at the Special Criminal Court for shooting with intent to kill a Garda during an armed robbery at an Allied Irish Banks sub-branch at Wang Laboratories in Castletroy, Limerick in 1982. He had been a member of the Provisional IRA. It has been alleged that he was kicked out of the IRA because of his involvement with illegal drugs.

Shortly after sentencing for his part in the 1982 raid on AIB in Wang laboratories, Douglas was sentenced for three other offences committed in 1982:

- The theft of IR£17,000 from ESB offices on Kylemore Road, Ballyfermot in February 1982.
- The theft of IR£2,000 in cash and IR£7,000 in jewellery from a woman who owned an amusement arcade in Rathmines.
- The theft of IR£98,000 from a post office in Tallaght.

He told Gardaí that these raids had been carried out on behalf of the Provisional IRA, which the Gardaí accepted.

Douglas was released from prison in the mid 1990s, resumed his criminal activities, and became increasingly involved in illegal drug trafficking.

In 2008 Douglas was stopped in a taxi with three other men near Pearse Street. Gardaí recovered a black holdall containing 8kg of cocaine. Telephone records from the previous three months linked the men. These drugs were trafficked by the Kinahan cartel.

In December 2011, Douglas was sentenced to ten years, with five suspended. He was also involved in dogfighting.

Douglas had links to the Hutch gang, as well as George Mitchell and a gang in Finglas.

== 2015 shooting ==
A senior member of the Kinahan gang survived an assassination attempt in November 2015 at a pub in West Dublin. The Kinahan gang blamed Douglas and an associate of his, Darren Kearns, who had convictions for drug dealing. Kearns was shot dead at the end of December 2015, with Gardaí believing that his death was the work of the Kinahan gang and that it was feud-related. Gardaí concluded that David Douglas was in a pub in the north inner city at the time of the attempted assassination and was not directly involved.

Douglas was shot in November 2015 while walking his dog near his home. His wife insisted after this shooting that he was a law-abiding citizen.

== 2016 shooting ==
He and his wife ran the Shoestown shop on Bridgefoot Street, where he was shot at about 4:10 pm on 1 July 2016. He was treated by paramedics at the scene and then taken to St. James's Hospital, where he died. He had been shot six times.

A handgun was recovered at the scene of the shooting. A stolen Mercedes car that detectives believed was used in the killing was found burnt out.

== Aftermath ==
=== Trial of Freddie Thompson ===
In November 2016, "Fat" Freddie Thompson was charged with the murder of David Douglas. In August 2018, he was convicted of murder and sentenced to a mandatory life sentence by the Special Criminal Court.

Justice Hunt said that the prosecution had not claimed that Thompson was the shooter, but that he was involved, specifically driving a Ford Fiesta closely involved with the crime. As well as interacting with suspects, it drove past Shoestown four minutes before the murder.

Thompson was caught on CCTV dismantling a mobile phone and acting in a furtive manner. He was seen later that evening in a restaurant having a meal with two men suspected of being part of the murder plot.

The defence has said that while Thompsons' behaviour was 'suspicious' it fell short of the standard of proof beyond a reasonable doubt. Justice Hunt said that any innocent explanation of the various threads of evidence required “an excessive reliance on unlucky coincidence”. The court had taken into account Thompson's failure to answer Garda's questions about his movements on that day. Thompson also refused to answer questions about cars and fingerprint evidence that placed him in one of the vehicles.

Justice Hunt sympathized with the family of the murder victim, particularly his daughter, who witnessed the murder.

Superintendent Paul Cleary said outside that the Douglas family was satisfied with the verdict and that the investigation is ongoing.

Counsel for Thompson said the verdict would be appealed.

=== Trial of Nathan Foley ===
Nathan Foley of Rosary Road, Maryland, Dublin, admitted assisting the killers of Daithi Douglas and was sentenced to six years in prison in January 2019. He drove one of the four cars used in the murder, as well as buying phones used in it. He was the second person to be jailed in connection with the murder.

=== Trial of Gareth Brophy ===
In January 2020, Gareth Brophy pleaded guilty to being involved in the murder. He was 25 and from Reuben Walk in Dublin 8. He was the driver of the getaway car. In February 2020, he was sentenced to ten years in prison, with the final six months suspended. The sentence was backdated to 18 November 2018 - the date he went into custody.

=== Trial of Lee Canavan ===
In May 2021 Lee Canavan was found guilty of the murder. The Special Criminal Court did not accept that there was evidence that he had shot Douglas, but ruled that he was part of a joint enterprise to murder as part of a "meticulously planned execution". Canavan, from Edenbrook in Rathfarnham was also found guilty of a second charge of criminal damage to a Suzuki Swift at Strand Road, Sandymount on 4 July 2016. The car belonged to Theresa Devoy. He is the half-brother of Gareth Brophy.

On 3 June 2021 he was jailed for life for his part in the murder.

== 2020 arrest ==
In May 2020, a man in his 30s was arrested in connection with the murder after being extradited from the UK.
