= James Quinn (Irish criminal) =

Irish criminal

James Quinn is an Irish criminal and convicted accessory to murder. He is originally from south inner city Dublin.

== Family ==
He is a nephew of Martin "the Viper" Foley.

== Sporting career ==
He is a former boxer.

== Criminal history ==
He assaulted a Garda on South Great George's Street in April 2008 and reinforcements had to be called to subdue him.

He was questioned about the beating and shooting of an addict in June 2008, but never charged.

In July 2013 he was sentenced to two years imprisonment with one year suspended for threatening a bouncer with a hammer after the bouncer had ejected him from a pub in Dublin city centre.

In September 2015, Gary Hutch was shot dead in Marbella, which began the Hutch–Kinahan feud. James Quinn was found guilty of being a necessary accessory - a getaway driver - to the murder and possession of a gun. He was sentenced to 22 years in prison and ordered to pay €90,000 compensation to the family of Gary Hutch.
