= Hutch–Kinahan feud =

Organised crime conflict in Ireland

- Date: 24 September 2015 – present
- Location: Ireland and Spain
- Caused by: Murder of Gary Hutch
- Methods: Beatings, stabbings, shootings and pipe bomb attacks, house arson

Parties
Hutch Family	Kinahan Family

Lead figures
Gerry Hutch	Christy Kinahan

Casualties
- Deaths: 18
- Arrested: ~60

The Hutch–Kinahan feud is a major ongoing feud between two criminal organisations in Ireland that has resulted in the deaths of eighteen people, the majority of which have been perpetrated by the Kinahan family. The Hutch gang, led by Gerry Hutch, and the Kinahan Family, led by Daniel Kinahan, are the main participants.

The feud has taken the form of a large number of attacks, mostly shootings, on people associated with the Hutch and Kinahan gangs (though some have been cases of mistaken identity). Most attacks have been in Dublin, a few elsewhere in Ireland, and some in Spain—including the murder of Gary Hutch, which sparked off the feud.

== Feud ==
There was a shooting in 2014, but it is generally considered that the feud began in 2015, when Gary Hutch was murdered in Marbella, Spain, and escalated after the February 2016 Dublin hotel attack.

In 2016, just after the Regency Hotel attack, a Special Crime Task Force was created within the national Drugs and Organised Crime Bureau (DOCB) to combat crime gangs, especially the Kinahan and Hutch gangs. Manned by at least 10 gardaí and three sergeants, the task force was scheduled to close in 2021; however, despite at least 18 people being killed in the feud, their success in preventing 50 other murder attempts means it will continue operating.

As of June 2018, Gardaí have seized 456 firearms, €2.2 million in cash, and €64 million worth of drugs in their efforts to tackle the feud. Commentators have noted that the feud highlights the difficulty An Garda Síochána have with policing Irish gangs with transnational structures.

== Timeline of events ==
=== 2014 ===
==== Shooting of Jamie Moore – August ====
On 4 August 2014, ex-boxer Jamie Moore was training Matthew Macklin at Macklin's Gym Marbella in Marbella, Spain which Macklin had set up with Daniel Kinahan. Moore was shot twice in the leg, in a case of mistaken identity. Sources differ on whether the intended victim was Gary Hutch or Daniel Kinahan. Moore recovered from the shooting.

=== 2015 ===
==== Murder of Gary Hutch – September ====
The murder of Gary Hutch at approximately 11:30 a.m. on 24 September 2015 initiated the ongoing feud. Gary Hutch, who was 34 years old at the time of his death, was shot dead at an apartment complex in the Miraflores neighbourhood of Marbella, Spain. Originally from Champions Avenue in Dublin's city centre, Gary was the nephew of Gerry "the Monk" Hutch, the leader of the Hutch crime syndicate. At the time of his death, Gary was a "well-known" criminal in Dublin, who had previously been convicted of armed robbery. After his release from prison he moved to Spain, where had lived for the eight years prior to his death. Gary, unarmed at the time of his killing, is reported have pleaded for his life before being shot by his killer.

Gary Hutch had been working closely with Daniel Kinahan for some time before his death. By 2014, however, he was suspected as being an informant for the Spanish police, though this would posthumously be discovered to have been a false allegation. He also tried to shoot a senior Kinahan gang member. Allegedly, Gerry Hutch had organised with Daniel Kinahan for a close associate of Gerry's to be shot in a "punishment shooting", as compensation for Gary's supposed role as an informant. Patrick Hutch, Gary's brother, is alleged to have voluntarily been shot in the leg by Daniel Kinahan in an attempt to save his brother's life. €200,000 was also paid to the Kinahan family by Gary Hutch, in exchange for his life. Both deals, however, were reneged upon, and Gary was killed.

- In 2018, Dubliner James Quinn, a former boxer with a criminal record, was convicted of being involved in the murder by being a lookout and helping the killer to reach and flee the scene. He was also found guilty of a second charge of illegal weapons possession.
- The state prosecutor called on the judge to jail Quinn for a total of 28 years—25 for the murder and 3 for the weapons possession charges. A life sentence was ruled out because jurors rejected the prosecution's claims that Quinn was a member of a criminal organisation despite the prosecution saying the killing was part of the Kinahan-Hutch feud. The jury also found that it had not been proven that Quinn had been paid for the murder.
- Quinn is a nephew of Martin Foley, a criminal known as "the Viper" who was an associate of Martin Cahill. He had worked as an enforcer for drug dealers and developed strong links with the Kinahans.

==== Attack on Derek Hutch – October ====
On 9 October 2015, two weeks after Gary Hutch was murdered, his younger brother Derek "Del Boy" Hutch was stabbed while serving a sentence for murder in Mountjoy prison. A €10,000 bounty had been put on him by Christy Kinahan. He survived the attack.

==== Murder of Darren Kearns – December ====
On 30 December, Darren Kearns, an associate of the Hutches, was shot dead in front of his wife shortly after he left the Phoenix Chinese restaurant on Blackhorse Avenue He had convictions for drug dealing and spent time in prison. It is thought that Kearns and another gang member are responsible for a botched attempt on the lives of Kinahan gang members.

- No-one has been charged with the murder as of October 2021.

=== 2016 ===
2016 was the bloodiest year of the feud, with ten people being killed that year, six of whom were killed in the first six months of the year. Of the dead, six were associated with the Hutch gang, one with the Kinahans, and two were innocent men who were killed in cases of mistaken identity.

==== Regency Hotel attack, February ====
On 5 February 2016, a WBO boxing match for the European Lightweight title between Jamie Kavanagh and Antonio João Bento was to take place at the Regency Hotel in Whitehall, Dublin. At the weigh-in, there was an organised armed attack; the match was cancelled after the shooting. There were at least four attackers wearing masks, army style-helmets and flak jackets; two of whom were disguised as members of the Garda Emergency Response Unit and armed with AK-47s. An associate of the Kinahan cartel, David Byrne, was shot dead; security sources said that the gang had intended to kill others. Two men were injured and taken to the Mater Private Hospital and Beaumont Hospital. It is believed that Daniel Kinahan, the son of Christy Kinahan, was the intended target, but he had left early. After the attack, security camera recordings suggested that six people had been involved, including a man disguised as a woman. The attackers escaped in a Ford Transit van which was later found burnt-out.

- On 18 May 2016, Patrick Hutch, the brother of Gary Hutch, was charged at the Criminal Courts of Justice with the murder of David Byrne. His trial for murder and possession of firearms was later set for January 2018 at the non-jury Special Criminal Court; he was denied bail.
- The trial of Patrick Hutch at the Criminal Courts of Justice for the murder of David Byrne collapsed on 20 February 2019, after the suicide of lead investigator, Detective Superintendent Colm Fox. An investigation into the circumstances surrounding the death of the Superintendent was launched by the Garda Síochána Ombudsman Commission.
- In October 2020 a 26-year-old Hutch gang member was arrested with a Coolock criminal when Garda detectives halted an alleged drugs handover in which over three kilos of cannabis were seized. The Kinahan cartel reportedly believe he was involved in the Regency Hotel attack.
- In August 2021 Gerry Hutch was arrested in Spain on a European Arrest Warrant in connection with the shooting. At a trial in Ireland in March/April 2023, Gerry Hutch was acquitted, being found not guilty of the murder. Paul Murphy and Jason Bonney were found guilty of facilitating the murder of Byrne.

==== Murder of Eddie Hutch Snr – February ====
Three days after the Regency attack, Eddie Hutch Snr was killed at his home on 8 February 2016. He was an uncle of Gary Hutch. The motive for his death is suspected to be revenge for the death of David Byrne.

- The investigation into the murder is still ongoing as of 2022.

==== Murder of Vincent Ryan – February ====
On 29 February, Vincent Ryan was shot dead while sitting in his car outside his partner's home in Finglas on 29 February 2016. A brother of Real IRA leader Alan Ryan, Vincent was murdered by members of the Kinahan gang, though sources differ on whether or not this was related to the Hutch-Kinahan conflict.

- Two men, Jeffrey Morrow and Paul O'Beirne, who pleaded guilty to assisting a criminal organisation in the murder. were sentenced to 11 and 9 years for the killing of Ryan,

==== Murder of Noel Duggan – March ====
On 23 March, Noel "Kingsize" Duggan, a friend of Gerry Hutch, was shot dead while sitting in his car outside his home in Ratoath, County Meath on 23 March 2016.

- The investigation is ongoing as of 2023.

==== Murder of Martin O'Rourke – April ====
Martin O'Rourke was shot dead on 14 April on Lower Sheriff Street, Dublin in a case of mistaken identity. He had no known criminal connections.

- Gardaí believe Glen Clarke was responsible for the shooting. Clarke was found dead in a stolen car in Ireland on 2 December 2016, shot through the head.

==== Murder of Michael Barr – April ====
Michael Barr was shot dead on 25 April 2016, in the Sunset House in Summerhill, Dublin. The Garda Síochána suspect he was killed by the Kinahan gang because of involvement in the Regency Hotel attack. He had dissident republican links and is understood to have provided the weaponry involved in the attack.

- Eamonn Cumberton was sentenced to life in prison for the killing of Barr.

==== Murder of Gareth Hutch – May ====
On 24 May, Gareth Hutch was fatally shot by two attackers in the carpark of the Avondale House flats complex where he lived. He was a minor figure in the criminal world.

- In November 2018 the Special Criminal Court found Johnathan Keogh, his sister Regina Keogh and Thomas Fox guilty of the murder. All three were sentenced to life imprisonment.

==== Murder of David Douglas – July ====
David Douglas was fatally shot outside a shop he ran with his wife in Bridgefoot Street, Dublin 8, on 1 July. He had survived being shot the previous November.

- Lee Canavan was found guilty of the Douglas murder in 2021.

==== Murder of Trevor O'Neill – August ====
Trevor O'Neill, a Dublin City Council worker from Drimnagh was killed in a case of mistaken identity in Costa de la Calma, near Magaluf, on 17 August 2016 He was shot five times in front of his family. Gardaí believe that he was mistaken for a member of the Hutch family by the Kinahan gang.

- Glen Clarke, believed to be O'Neill's killer was found dead in a stolen car in Ireland on 2 December 2016, shot through the head.

==== Murder of Noel Kirwan – December ====
Noel "Duck Egg" Kirwan, a close associate of Gerry Hutch, was shot dead in front of his partner outside his house in Ronanstown in west Dublin on 22 December 2016. It is believed he was killed simply because of his association with Hutch, as he was photographed talking to him at Eddie Hutch's funeral in February 2016.

On 18 June, two men in their thirties were arrested by armed members of the Garda Emergency Response Unit and Drugs and Organised Crime Bureau on the Naas Dual carriageway. A Glock 9mm semi-automatic handgun was found in one man's car. Both were linked to the Kinahan gang; one was a close associate of David Byrne. Gardaí believe they were planning to shoot someone.

In December 2018 Jason Keating was sentenced to ten years for helping in the murder of Noel Kirwan. Keating was initially charged with the murder, but that charge was dropped when he admitted taking part in the activities of a criminal organisation and helping them to murder Noel Kirwan. Keating was connected to the crime by CCTV, buying the "burner" phone, bringing the killer to and from the scene, was in contact with the person tracking the car and conveyed that information to the killer.

In July 2022 Martin Aylmer was sentenced to eight years and four months for helping the Kinahan gang murder Noel Kirwan and the attempted murder of James 'Mago' Gately in 2017. He was already serving six years for admitting buying mobile phones for members of the Kinahan gang who murdered Michael Barr in the Sunset House pub in Dublin in April 2016.

In May 2024 Michael Crotty was sentenced to two years for helping the gang by buying top-up credit for a phone used in the murder of Noel Kirwan.

In June 2024, Declan Brady was sentenced to ten years in jail with the final year suspended for his involvement with the killing. Brady, who claimed that he is no longer affiliated with the Kinahan gang, is already serving sentences for money laundering and firearms offences. The final year of his sentence was suspended on condition that Brady continued disassociating from the gang.

On 29 May 2025, Kinahan Cartel lieutenant Sean McGovern was extradited from the UAE to Ireland where he was placed under arrest and subsequently charged with the murder. On 16 March 2026, he pleaded guilty to directing a criminal gang. In June 2026, he was sentenced to 24 years in prison for directing activities of a criminal gang, including his involvement in the murder of Kirwan and the attempted murder of Hutch gang member James "Mago" Gately.

=== 2017 ===
==== Knife attack on Tom Fox – March ====
Tom Fox, on remand in Mountjoy Prison in relation to the fatal shooting of Gareth Hutch, was attacked on 28 March 2017 along with another inmate, suffering multiple stab wounds.

==== Arrest of three Kinahan associates – April ====
An Irish man in his thirties, another aged 58, and 58-year-old Estonian man Imre Arakas were arrested by armed members of the Garda Emergency Response Unit and Drugs and Organised Crime Bureau on 4 April 2017. They were arrested in Blakestown Road in Clonsilla in a safe house owned by Kinahan associate Eric Fowler who had allegedly tipped-off Gardaí, resulting in his death in December 2018. It is believed the Estonian may be a hired killer, brought into the country by the Kinahan gang to continue the feud. Drugs and a list of Hutch associates were found. Only Mr Arakas was charged.

==== Shooting of James Gately – May ====
James 'Mago' Gately, a 29-year-old long-term friend of Gary Hutch, had been hiding out in Belfast and Newry having fled his home in Dublin's north inner city. On 10 May 2017, he was shot fives times by a lone gunman in his car at the Topaz petrol station on the Clonshaugh Road in North Dublin. It is believed a bullet-proof vest he was wearing saved his life as four shots went into it, but he was also shot in the jaw, causing serious injuries. Gately was in a red Mondeo and the shooter was in a black Lexus which pulled alongside the Mondeo before Gately was shot. It was the second attempt on Gately's life in six months.

- In July 2020 two men were charged at the Special Criminal Court with involvement with the attempted murder of James Gately. They were ordered to both reappear at the court on 8 July.
- On 8 July 2020 one of the men was granted bail despite Garda objections.
- On 5 January 2021 Caolan Smyth from Donore, County Meath was convicted of attempting to murder James Gately. Gary McAreavey of Castlebellingham, County Louth was convicted of acting to impede an apprehension or prosecution by purchasing petrol and assisting in the burning out of the car used in the attempted murder at Newrath, Dromiskin, County Louth. Sentencing is due on 25 January 2021.
- In July 2021 Peadar Keating of Rowlagh Green, Clondalkin pleaded guilty in the Special Criminal Court to directing the activities of a criminal gang between December 2016 and April 2017. He admitted gathering information on James Gately and following him as well as involving Estonian hitman Imre Arakas to kill Gately. Gately has ten previous convictions, including one in Spain for brawling. Keating was sentenced to 11 years imprisonment in September 2021.

==== Murder of Michael Keogh – May ====
Michael Keogh, whose brother, Jonathan Keogh and sister, Regina were convicted in 2018 of the murder of Gareth Hutch on 24 May 2016, had Kinahan links. He was shot dead on 31 May 2017. Keogh was in his car in the underground car park of the apartment complex where he lived in Dorset Street in north inner city Dublin.

He had previous convictions for assaulting Gardaí and for firearms offences. He was before the courts in 2016 in relation to a firearms charge. He was also a known associate of Jason Molyneux and other Hutch gang members. It is believed the Kinahan cartel killed him because of this. However, he had links with numerous different criminals and Gardaí could not rule out that he was killed by another criminal gang or that he was set up to be killed by Molyneux.

- Insufficient evidence had been found by 2021 to link the Hutch group to the murder.

==== Murder of Jamie Tighe-Ennis – October ====
24 year-old Jamie Tighe-Ennis was shot dead outside a house on Moatview Avenue in Coolock.

He had previous convictions for assaulting gardaí and for firearms offences and was before the courts in 2016 in relation to a firearms charge. He was also a known associate of Jason Molyneux and other Hutch gang members and it is believed the Kinahan cartel killed him because of this. However, he had links with numerous different criminals and Gardaí could not rule out that he was killed by another criminal gang or that he was set up to be killed by Molyneux.

==== Attempted murder of Gary Hanley – November ====
An attempt to murder Gary Hanley was thwarted by Garda surveillance of the likely perpetrators after tracking devices were found on Gary Hanley's car.

- Alan Wilson, who had previously been tried for murder committed in 2008 and for attacking a man with a meat cleaver during a burglary in 2009 although found not guilty of both. Luke Wilson, who had a Beretta pistol and was a nephew of Alan and Joseph Kelly who had numerous previous convictions including previous firearms and explosive convictions. Alan Wilson plead guilty and was jailed for 6 years; Luke, who also plead guilty, received 10 and Kelly 11 years. Others were also convicted.

==== Murder of Kane McCormack – December ====
24 year-old Kane McCormack was shot in the head on 1 December 2017. His body was found in Walterstown, County Meath between Leixlip and Dunboyne. He was last seen alive at 5pm the previous day after telling his partner he was going to meet someone. When he failed to return, his partner became concerned for his safety and contacted the Gardaí. His car was later found at an Aldi supermarket in Clonee.

Gardaí believe he parked his car at the Aldi in Clonee and then got into a black saloon-type car. Gardaí in Finglas later received a call that a black Audi was on fire just off the M50 at Meakstown Cottages at about 6pm.

Kane McCormack was a son of Noel Kirwan, who had been shot about a year before as part of the feud between the Kinahans and Hutches.

One line of inquiry is that the Kinahan gang believed he posed a threat to them because he wanted revenge for his father's death. He had been officially warned by the Gardaí that his life was in danger. McCormack had been caught with 50 rounds of .32 ammunition in November 2017. It was suspected the ammunition was connected with dissident Republican extortion rackets. Gardaí believe he had enemies other than the Kinahan gang.

- A man was arrested on suspicion of McCormack's murder on 17 December 2018 but was released without charge. On 6 March 2019, another man was arrested in Mountjoy Prison in connection with the murder but he too was released without charge.

=== 2018 ===
==== Murder of Derek Coakley-Hutch – January ====
At about 3pm on 20 January 2018, Derek Coakley-Hutch was shot while he sat in a car in the Bridgeview halting site beside Cloverhill Prison. He had gone to the prison earlier in the day to visit his brother Nathan, then returned to the area with two other men in a car. They were there to throw drugs over the prison wall. The two men got out of the car and went to part of the halting site where horses were kept in a pen. On hearing shots, they ran back to the car, which had moved a short distance. They tried to resuscitate Coakley-Hutch, but he died at the scene., having been shot in the head a number of times. He had been warned that his life was in danger.

Gardaí believe the killers escaped in a black Volkswagen Golf that was set on fire at nearby Crag Avenue before transferring to a black Toyota Avensis which was found burned out at Snowdrop Walk, Darndale.

Derek Coakley-Hutch had a criminal record, having previously pleaded guilty to possession of an imitation firearm during the robbery of a Spar in Styles Road, Clontarf on 11 June 2015. He had carried the coffin of his uncle, Eddie Hutch, who had been shot as part of the feud. He was also a nephew of Gerry Hutch.

- Nobody has been charged as of July 2022, despite 450 lines of enquiry.

==== National Boxing Stadium shooting – January ====
A member of the Hutch family was due to compete in a tournament on 26 January 2018. It began at the National Boxing Stadium on the South Circular road in Dublin, and there was a heavy Garda presence as a result. A car pulled up near the National Stadium at around 9.45pm on the night of the tournament and fired at a man who is known to gardaí; he was hit in the foot as he ran towards Griffith College. The second man, who was injured in the hand, is understood to have been a student at the college who had been walking nearby. Both men, who were aged in their 40s and 20s, were taken to St James Hospital with injuries which were not life-threatening. Two cars were later found burnt-out in north Dublin.

==== Murder of Jason Molyneux – January ====
Jason Molyneux, a well-known Dublin criminal with 122 prior convictions, was shot dead on 30 January 2018. He was shot at the James Larkin House flats complex on the North Strand close to where he lived, and had just returned from the wake of his friend Derek Coakley-Hutch who had been shot dead 10 days earlier. The two-man hit team immediately drove from North Strand to the nearby East-Link Toll Bridge and abandoned their Renault Kango van. They returned two hours later and attempted to set fire to it.

==== Attempted murder of Patsy Hutch – March ====
Three men were arrested in a van in the car park of the Belmont apartments in Gardiner Street at 8am on 10 March 2018. They were armed with a sub-machine gun, an automatic pistol and a revolver. Another man was arrested later in the day and further searches were conducted in several locations in Dublin. These searches yielded a machine gun and another firearm, a silencer and a quantity of ammunition.

Gardaí believed that the men were intending to attack Patsy Hutch, brother of Gerry Hutch. Patsy's son Gary had been shot dead in Spain by the Kinahans in Spain in 2015. Patsy himself has no connections to crime, but he has survived at least three attempts on his life and had been warned repeatedly by the Gardaí that his life was in danger. Despite the threats on his life he has refused to move from his home.

Gardaí believed that the men intended to create a disturbance that would draw Patsy out of his home and then attack him.

Late on the night of 27 March 2018 three walls in the north inner city of Dublin near Patsy Hutch's home were daubed with the graffiti "Patsy dies feud ends". Gardaí believe the graffiti was to draw Patsy out of his house in order to shoot him.

- In July 2019 the three man hit squad, Gary Thompson, his brother Glen Thompson, were each jailed for 12 years and six months. Afghan war veteran Robert Browne was sentenced to 11 years and six months in prison.
- In June 2020, Michael Burns, Stephen Curtis and Ciarán O'Driscoll were jailed for a total of nineteen years for their parts in a plot to murder Patrick "Patsy" Hutch. Burns was sentenced to nine years in prison while the other two were sentenced to five years each. The execution was to be carried out for the Kinahan gang which is organised in a hierarchical structure with cells and subcells.
- Burns had received instructions on an encrypted phone from someone referred to as Suspect Number 1 and the evidence definitely involved in the preparation of the murder attempt. Burns passed on instructions developed by others and was not at the top of the hierarchy. Burns was also a supervisor in the plot who organised cars and phones.
- Curtis had acted in a more limited role that was nevertheless important—he was involved in meetings and had obtained phone and SIM cards for the hit-team. He was recorded expressing reservations about Suspect Number 1 and saying he wanted to get out of the gang.
- O'Driscoll would perform the role of watching Patsy Hutch's house until he emerged then alert the hit-team so they could shoot him. His grandmother lived on Champions Avenue and he was useful to the gang as his presence on the road would not rouse any suspicions. He took risks that were naive, such as using his own phone which assisted in his identification. He did not stand to gain in any significant way and was told that his drug debt would be cleared.
- On 31 August 2020 Patrick Curtis, 38, of Bellman's Walk, Seville Place, Dublin 1 and Mohammed Smew, 27, of Milner's Square, Shanowen Road, Santry, Dublin 9 were jailed. Curtis was sentenced to ten years while Smew was sentenced to seven years.
- Mr Justice Tony Hunt said both men were part of a sub-cell of the Kinahan organised crime group. Patrick Curtis was the most senior member of the subcell and he was entrusted to take orders on an encrypted phone from someone at the highest level of the gang known by the pseudonym "Lordnose". Gardaí were able to access some of the messages because Curtis could not remember all the instructions and photographed some of them on his own phone.
- Smew had pleaded guilty to participating in the activities of a criminal organisation, namely the murder of Mr. Hutch, by providing, moving and repairing vehicles and planning or assisting to plan an attempted shooting between 1 February 2018 and 3 March 2018.
- Smew was involved in planning and was part of the original hit team with Mark Capper, but he could not take part because he was arrested in Tallaght for looting a Centra shop during Storm Emma.
- Their sentences were backdated to December 2019, when they were first arrested.

==== Arrest of two Kinahan associates – July ====
Two men were arrested in front of the SuperValu shop on Howth Road in Killester on 16 July 2018. They were arrested by the Garda Emergency Response Unit who found a loaded handgun in their car. The two men, aged 25 and 28, are known by Gardai to be connected to the Kinahan gang and it was suspected that they were targeting a member of the Hutch gang.

==== Murder of Clive Staunton – November ====
Clive Staunton, a street trader, was shot dead outside his home around 9:15pm on 15 November 2018. He had been selling merchandise at the Beggars Bush junction before the Ireland v Northern Ireland match at the Aviva Stadium. Normally he sold merchandise before and after matches, but he left during the game. He arrived at his home in the Glen Easton estate in Leixlip around 9:10-9:15pm. A gunman fired shots through the windscreen and drivers window—Staunton tried to escape but the gunman shot him twice in the head. The gunman fled in a silver/grey Volvo S40 which was later found burnt out in Kilbride, County Wicklow. Mr Staunton was originally from the Greek Street flats of Dublin, but had lived in Leixlip for more than 20 years. He was a widower and was a distant relation through marriage of the Hutch family. He had minor convictions for counterfeiting, but was never involved in serious criminality. Gardai confirmed that a link to the feud was one element of the investigation.

- Some arrests have been made, but nothing has reached court as of 2022.

==== Murder of Eric Fowler – December ====
On 22 December 2018, exactly two years after Noel Kirwan had been shot dead, 34-year-old Eric Fowler was shot in the head and killed at his home at Blakestown Cottages in Clonsilla. Two gunmen waited outside the house before running up as he was locking his car. He was shot a number of times in the head and collapsed at the side of the house despite trying to escape. A silver Volkswagen Jetta was found burnt out at Rusheeny Green in Clonee. Fowler had been formally warned by Gardaí that there was a credible threat to his life. Gardaí said there were a number of lines of inquiry, but it was possible that it was connected to the local criminal feuds in Finglas and Blanchardstown or possibly to the Kinahan-Hutch feud.

- Nobody has been charged with the murder and the Garda have no suspect they can charge as of July 2022.

=== 2019 ===
==== Lee Boylan attempted murder – March ====
24-year-old Lee Boylan was shot three times and critically injured on 6 March 2019. He was driving a van on Blakestown Road in Clonsilla close to the scene of the murder of Boylan's friend Eric Fowler over two months previously. A BMW 3 Series that was involved in the shooting was found burnt out on nearby Saddlers Drive. Boylan was an associate of the Kinahan cartel and it is unclear if they organised his shooting or if the Hutch gang were behind it. Boylan has life changing injuries.

- The getaway driver Alan Graham, was jailed for 10 years. He had already spent 10 years in jail in 2010 when found with €750,000 worth of cocaine and €200,000 in cash.

== Notable individuals involved ==
=== Kinahan family and associates ===
The Kinahan crime family is primarily involved in the drug trade.

- Christy Kinahan: Also known as "the Dapper Don", Kinahan, born 1958 (age 64–65), is the head of the Kinahan crime family.
- Daniel Kinahan: Christy's eldest son, and allegedly manages the day-to-day operations of the family's criminal empire. A boxing promoter, Daniel has worked as an advisor for Tyson Fury.
- Imre "The Butcher" Arakas: A notorious Estonian hitman, he is known for committing murders in several European countries. In addition to having killed dozens of members of the Russian Mafia. He is the assassin who was hired by the Kinahans to kill James "Mago" Gately (an associate of Gerry Hutch).
- Declan "Mr Nobody" Brady: One of Daniel Kinahan's closest associates, he holds some of the most important positions within the gang: he is the main logistics man and quartermaster of the Kinahans, being primarily responsible for the gang's weapons depot and for their safety as a result.
- Ross Browning: A native of Dublin, Ireland, he is one of the Kinahan family's top lieutenants. Considered Daniel Kinahan's right-hand man, he has been responsible for the operations of the Kinahan crime syndicate in Ireland for over two decades and as a result, he has become a priority target for the Gardaí and the CAB due to his proximity to Daniel Kinahan.
- David Byrne † Killed February 2016 at the Regency Hotel (now the Bonnington Dublin) in Whitehall, Dublin.
- Liam Byrne: A notorious and dangerous Dublin gangster, he is a high-ranking member of the Kinahan Family. He comes from a criminal family led by his father James Byrne (who was an associate of notorious Irish gangster Martin "The General" Cahill) and is the older brother of David Byrne, an associate of the Kinahan Family who was murdered on 5 February 2016. He is also a cousin of another member of the Kinahan family, Freddie "Fat" Thompson.
- Douglas 'Oscar' Glynn – A footsoldier jailed for 6.5 years for involvement in the foiled plot to murder James 'Mago' Gately.
- Leon Griffin: A footsoldier for the gang, he's a friend of Freddie Thompson and is known to be one of the most brutal and volatile criminals not only in the Kinahan family, but in all of Dublin.
- Gerard "Hatchet" Kavanagh: He was believed to have worked as a debt collector and enforcer for the Kinahans. He was shot dead on 5 September 2014 in Elivira, Marbella. Aged forty-four at the time of his death, he had been heavily involved in the drug trade for over 20 years.
- Thomas "Bomber" Kavanagh: One of the leaders of the Kinahan family (he is the second-in-command), he is considered by many to be Ireland's most feared mobster and is considered the main name of the Kinahan family in the UK. He is known to be brutal and very violent, being responsible for at least 7 murders. His cousins Paul Kavanagh and Gerard "Hatchet" Kavanagh were also members of the Kinahan family (both were murdered in cold blood by "Bomber" Kavanagh).
- Ciaran O'Driscoll: A footsoldier for the gang, he has a criminal record that ranges from possession of illegal drugs to attempted murder (he was one of those involved in the attempted murder of Patrick "Patsy" Hutch, Gerry Hutch's older brother).
- Paul Rice: A high-ranking member of the Kinahan family, he is notoriously known for being extremely violent and because of this, he is considered a high-value target by both the Hutch family and other enemy gangs.
- Freddie Thompson: A cousin of Liam Byrne, he was the head of the Dublin branch of the Kinahan gang from 1997 to 2008, when he had to leave Ireland over a feud he had with the INLA. Currently serving a life sentence for the murder of David "Dathi" Douglas. He is considered a key figure in the Crumlin-Drimnagh feud.

=== Hutch family and associates ===
The Hutch crime family is primarily involved in robberies.

- Gerry Hutch: Also known as "the Monk", he earned his nickname because he does not drink alcohol, smoke, or take drugs. Born in 1964, Gerry is the head of the Hutch crime family.
- Jason Hutch - a son of Gerry Hutch, he was extradited from Lanzarote on 10 September 2026 and arrested in relation to Serious Organised Crime offences. His arrest stems from an investigation by the National Bureau of Criminal Investigation.
- Gary Hutch: † He was a nephew of Gerry Hutch, and had worked for the Kinahan family, being described as once having been Daniel Kinahan's "right-hand man". His murder in September 2015 initiated the ongoing feud.
- Eddie Hutch: † Brother of Gerry Hutch, he was shot dead on 8 February 2016.
- Derek "Del Boy" Hutch: Brother of Gary Hutch. He is considered one of the most violent members of the Hutch family, with a long criminal record (ranging from robbery and armed robbery to murder). Del Boy Hutch changed his surname by deed poll in 2021 shortly before being released from prison.
- Noel "Kingsize" Duggan: † A close friend of Gerry Hutch, it is known to the police that he was involved in the lucrative cigarette smuggling in Dublin. He was murdered on 23 March 2016 by a team of hitmen connected to Christy Kinahan.
- James "Mago" Gately: an associate of Gerry Hutch, he is a prime target of the Kinahans, having been targeted twice in 2017, as the Kinahans believe he played a role in the 2016 Regency Hotel attack, which it is assumed the target would be Daniel Kinahan and which culminated in the death of an associate of the Kinahan Family, David Byrne (brother of a key member of the Kinahan gang, Liam Byrne).
- Gary Hanley: One of Gerry Hutch's most elusive associates, Gary Hanley is famously known to have escaped several attempts on his life unharmed (as a result he is considered one of the main targets of the Kinahans).
- Jason "Buda" Molyneux: † A criminal with over 120 convictions, he was shot dead on 30 January 2018.

== See also ==
- Crumlin-Drimnagh feud
