= Killing of Eddie Hutch Snr =

2016 Irish gang killing

The shooting of Eddie Hutch Snr occurred on 8 February 2016. Eddie was the brother of Gerry Hutch, the leader of the Hutch gang, which was in a feud with the Kinahan gang, led by Christy Kinahan. The feud of the two criminal gangs, called the 2015–16 Irish gangland feud, in the Republic of Ireland resulted in the deaths of ten people.

== Before shooting ==
Eddie was a brother of Gerry Hutch and was considered a non-violent criminal, having convictions for small-time fraud and shoplifting. Eddie took legal action when courts decided that he did not qualify for compensation from Dublin Corporation when his local authority home burned down while he was in prison for breaching a barring order. Eventually he was awarded the full IR£20,000 amount.

However, he had been suspected of helping his brother launder proceeds from crime and was one of a large number of his brothers' associates targeted by Operation Alpha, the first major operation of the Criminal Assets Bureau (CAB). A bank account in his name containing €160,000 was seized by the CAB.

He had also worked as a taxi driver. He was an uncle of Gary Hutch who was shot dead in September 2015.

== Shooting ==
Men broke into his house on Poplar Row, North Strand, Dublin at about 7.45pm on 8 February, and Eddie Hutch was shot nine times. His partner was at home at the time, but was not injured.

The motive for his killing is thought by Gardaí to be revenge for the shooting of David Byrne.

== 2023 arrest ==
In April 2023 a man in his 40s was arrested in connection with the shooting. He is being detailed under section 4 of the Criminal Justice Act 1984 at a Garda station in north Dublin.
