= Killing of David Byrne =

2016 murder in Ireland

2016 Regency Hotel Shooting
- Part of Hutch–Kinahan feud
- Location: 53.37740°N 6.24593°W; Regency Hotel, Whitehall, Dublin, Ireland
- Date: 5 February 2016
- Attack type: Shooting
- Weapons: 3 PM md. 63 assault rifles, multiple handguns
- Deaths: 1
- Injuries: 2
- Perpetrators: 6
- Motive: Revenge on Kinahan Gang for the murder of Gary Hutch

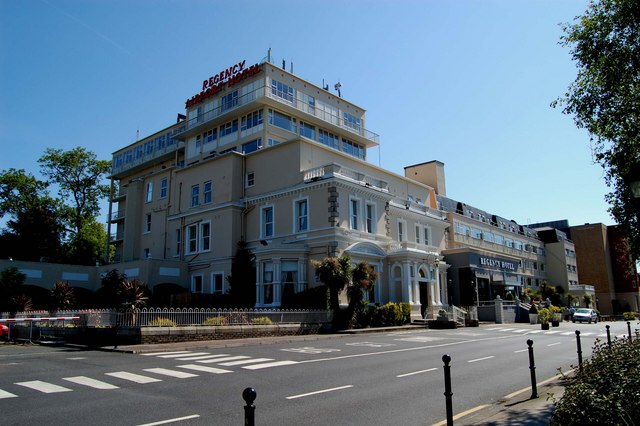
The Regency Hotel, Dublin

The Irish criminal David Byrne was shot dead on 5 February 2016 at the Regency Hotel in Whitehall, Dublin, Ireland.

It is believed by the Garda Síochána (police) that Daniel Kinahan, the son of Christy Kinahan, was the intended target, but had left early.

== Background ==
Byrne had been investigated by every Garda specialist unit since he was a teenager. He was present at the fatal stabbing of Declan Gavin in August 2001 in Crumlin, Dublin. He was called as a witness in the trial of Brian Rattigan for the killing, but said he had seen nothing.

David Byrne had been arrested many times and was a suspect in the murder of Gary Bryan in Walkinstown, Dublin, in 2006.

In January 2016, Gardaí had a special policing plan put in place for the following month when two boxing events would be attended by members of a criminal gang associated with Christy Kinahan. The Kinahan gang have a long association with boxing both in Dublin and Marbella in Spain.

== Shooting ==
On 5 February 2016, there was to be a boxing match for the World Boxing Organization European lightweight title between Jamie Kavanagh and Antonio João Bento at the National Stadium. At the weigh-in there was an organised armed attack; the match was cancelled after the shooting. There were at least four attackers with masks, army-style helmets and flak jackets, two of whom were disguised as members of the Garda Emergency Response Unit and armed with AK-47 assault rifles. An associate of the Kinahan cartel, David Byrne (34) was shot dead; security sources said that the gang had intended to kill others. Two men were injured and taken to the Mater Private Hospital and Beaumont Hospital.

After the attack, security camera recordings suggested that six people had been involved, including a man disguised as a woman. The attackers escaped in a Ford Transit van which was later found burnt-out.

== Funeral ==
Because of the length of time Byrne's body would be waked at his parents' house before the funeral, special security measures were put in place. The funeral was held at the Church of St Nicholas of Myra on Francis Street. Gardaí checked the church before and after the ceremony for explosives, but the funeral passed without incident and the hearse went to Mount Jerome Cemetery.

== Investigation ==
One line of investigation is that the shooting was in revenge for the murder of Gary Hutch in Spain in September 2015.

Shortly after the shooting, a call was placed to the BBC saying that the Continuity IRA terrorist group had carried out the attack because Byrne had been involved in the killing of Alan Ryan four years earlier; however, the Continuity IRA later stated that it was not responsible.

== Legal ==
On 18 May 2016, Patrick Hutch, the brother of Gary Hutch, was charged at the Criminal Courts of Justice with the murder of David Byrne. There was no application for bail; the defendant was granted legal aid and remanded to appear in Clover Hill District Court on 25 May. The trial of Patrick Hutch for murder and possession of firearms was later set for January 2018 at the non-jury Special Criminal Court; he was denied bail. On 20 February 2019, all charges against Patrick Hutch were dropped and he walked free from court.

In October 2019, the High Court ordered the Director of Public Prosecutions to provide transcripts of the collapsed trial to the Garda Síochána Ombudsman Commission. Jonathan Dowdall, a former Sinn Féin party councillor, was subsequently charged with the Regency murder.

In April 2021, Gerry Hutch became the subject of a European Arrest Warrant as Gardaí said they had enough evidence to charge him with murder in connection with the shooting of David Byrne. The EAW was issued after the Director for Public Prosecutions moved that he be charged with murder and tried before the Special Criminal Court. He is also likely to face other charges, such as attempted murder and possession of firearms. An investigation file was submitted by Garda detectives based in Ballymun, Dublin to the DPP late in 2020.

In April 2021, three men appeared in court in relation to the shooting. In August 2021, Gerry Hutch was arrested in Spain on foot of the European Arrest Warrant in connection with the shooting. In September 2021, Gerry Hutch was extradited to Ireland and charged with the murder of David Byrne.

On 28 September 2022, both Jonathan Dowdall and his father Patrick pleaded guilty to facilitating the murder of David Byrne.

On 3 October 2022, the Special Criminal Court was told that Jonathan Dowdall was willing to be a witness in the Regency shooting trial. The trial was adjourned for a week. Though Dowdall had been convicted of facilitating the murder, the charge of murder against him had been dropped. Dowdall is under Garda protection and is being assessed for the witness protection programme.

In April 2023, Gerry Hutch was acquitted of the murder of David Byrne.

== Aftermath ==
The hotel was renamed the Bonnington in October 2017. The renaming had been considered before the shooting, but the process was accelerated after it.

== See also ==
- Hutch–Kinahan feud
- List of unsolved murders (2000–present)
