= Gerry Hutch =

Irish criminal (born 1963)

- Born: Gerard Hutch; 11 April 1963 (age 63); Dublin, Ireland
- Other name: "The Monk"
- Occupation: Crime boss
- Allegiance: Hutch Gang

Gerard Hutch (born 11 April 1963) is an Irish alleged crime boss who is the reputed head of the Hutch Gang, a Dublin-based, international organised crime group. Nicknamed "The Monk" by Irish Times journalist Harry McGee due to his abstention from drugs and alcohol, Hutch was the prime suspect for two of the biggest armed robberies in Irish history; one at Marino Mart in 1987 and the Brinks robbery in 1995.

The Hutch Gang has been involved in a feud with the Kinahan Cartel, which has resulted in 18 murders. In April 2023, he was acquitted of planning the murder of Kinahan associate David Byrne, who was shot dead in February 2016. Hutch unsuccessfully ran as an independent candidate in the Dublin Central constituency at the 2024 Irish general election and in the 2026 by-election.

== Early life ==
Hutch was born in central Dublin on 11 April 1963. The son of Dublin dock worker Patrick Hutch and his wife Julia (died 1999), he was the sixth child of eight. He grew up in a council flat on Foley Street before moving to Liberty House on Railway Street. His criminal career began at the age of 10. At some point in the 1970s, Hutch joined the "Bugsy Malone" gang of inner city youngsters (named for the Bugsy Malone film), which he later led, and whose crimes included "jump-overs" - jumping over bank counters, grabbing cash and running. By the time he turned 18, he had over thirty convictions for joyriding, assault, burglary and theft among others, and had been imprisoned several times.

Hutch was later part of a gang led by drug dealer Eamon Kelly that was involved in major robberies, and he received many convictions between 1970 and 1983, intermittently spending time in prison. He admitted to being a "convicted criminal" in a 2008 interview with the Irish Independent, but insisted that he made his money through property deals, not crime.

== Criminal career ==
Hutch's gang were the prime suspects for two of the biggest robberies in the history of the state; the IR£1.7 million robbery of an armoured van at Marino Mart in January 1987 and the £3 million armed robbery of a Brinks Allied Security Depot in Clonshaugh, County Dublin, in 1995, which had been the largest cash robbery in the State at the time. A second attempted robbery of the Brinks depot was foiled by Gardaí in 1995. The gang was said to have amassed an estimated IR£40 million from a series of bank robberies, jewellery heists, and fraud scams spanning almost eight years. Much of the money from these robberies was never found, but two men were later found with a bag of cash from the raid and a building society account document with Hutch's name on it; after an unsuccessful appeal by Hutch, £400,000 was paid from this account to the building society's insurers.

He was questioned by Gardaí in 1996 over alleged intimidation of police, but was released without charge.

In 1999, in the course of court proceedings brought against Hutch by the Irish state's anti-money laundering agency, the Criminal Assets Bureau (CAB), Detective Chief Superintendent Felix McKenna stated that Hutch had been involved in the 1987 Marino Mart robbery and the £3 million Brinks robbery in 1995. Hutch eventually reached a £1.2 million settlement with the CAB to "cover back taxes and interest for a nine-year period".

For many years, Hutch could not be identified by name in the media, with various soubriquets such as "Mr Big", "Mr Clean" and "Mr Bean" (due to his reported resemblance to the character) being used for him, though the nickname that stuck the most was "The Monk", given to him by Irish Times journalist Harry McGee due to his abstention from alcohol and drugs.

Hutch has also been awarded money from legal actions in Irish courts. These included £8,500 won from Securicor Ireland in June 1991, £2,000 from the Sunday Tribune newspaper in a libel action and around £26,000 won in legal actions against the Irish state.

== Hutch-Kinahan feud ==
Hutch's nephew, Gary Hutch, was shot dead in September 2015 near Marbella, Andalusia, Spain, sparking a feud between the Hutch gang and the Kinahan organised crime group. As part of this, Hutch was twice target of an attempted assassination; once in January 2016 while in a pub in Spain, then again at Christmas 2016 in Lanzarote, surviving both attempts.

Hutch lost three family members in this feud; his brother Eddie Hutch Snr. was shot dead in North Strand Dublin in February 2016, his nephew Gareth Hutch was shot dead in May 2016 and another nephew Derek Coakley-Hutch was shot dead in January 2018. Other associates of Hutch killed in the feud included cigarette smuggler Noel "Kingsize" Duggan in March 2016, and Noel "Duck Egg" Kirwan, who was shot dead in December 2016; neither were involved in gang activity and were killed because of their connections to Hutch. The feud also saw two innocents, Martin O'Rourke and Trevor O'Neill, killed by Kinahan gang members in cases of mistaken identity.

=== Murder charges ===
In April 2021, Hutch became the subject of a European Arrest Warrant as Gardaí said they had enough evidence to charge him with murder in connection with the shooting of David Byrne, an associate of the Kinahan family who was shot dead at a boxing event in 2016. The EAW was issued after the Director for Public Prosecutions moved that he be charged with murder and tried before the Special Criminal Court. An investigation file was submitted by Garda detectives based in Ballymun to the DPP late in 2020. He was arrested in Spain in August 2021.

On 29 September 2021, he was extradited to Ireland, flown in a military CASA 235 from Madrid to Casement Aerodrome by the Irish Defence Forces. He was then taken to the Criminal Courts of Justice under armed Garda escort where he was charged with the murder of David Byrne before the Special Criminal Court. He was remanded in custody until 15 October at 10:30am. Other co-accused were to stand trial on 3 October 2022 and the state solicitor asked that he come in on that date, to which the three judges agreed.

Both Hutch and Jonathan Dowdall, who was also charged with the murder, claimed in judicial review before the High Court that trial before the Special Criminal Court would be unlawful and a breach of their fundamental rights because the court was acting as a permanent institution after being established on a temporary basis. These were dismissed by Mr Anthony Barr, who ruled that the legislation was neither temporary nor had any temporal limit. Both Hutch and Dowdall sought leave to appeal the High Court decision to the Supreme Court. On 5 May 2022 a panel reserved judgement in both cases. After a request from counsel for the Attorney General, the case was adjourned until 1 July 2022, pending the Supreme Court decision. The trial began in October 2022 and Hutch was found not guilty on 17 April 2023.

On 21 April 2023, an investigator with the Garda Síochána Ombudsman Commission resigned after allegations the officer had attended the same party as Hutch on 19 April.

== Political candidacy ==
In 2024, Hutch confirmed that he would run in the Dublin Central constituency at the 2024 Irish general election as an independent candidate. He secured 3,098 first preference votes but, with 5,321 votes on the eleventh count after transfers, failed to be elected by 781 votes. In November 2025, following the resignation of Paschal Donohoe as a TD for the constituency, Hutch confirmed his plans to run in the 2026 by-election. He secured 2,817 first preference votes; however was eliminated on the seventh count.

== In popular media ==
Hutch is depicted in the film Veronica Guerin, played by Alan Devine. It is based on the life of the late Irish journalist Veronica Guerin who had interviewed him.

Hutch appeared on RTÉ's Prime Time programme in March 2008 where he was interviewed about his life and criminal career. Hutch denied any criminal activity, since his last prison sentence, other than tax evasion.

Hutch was the subject of investigation in the Irish TV3 channel's television series, Dirty Money. Episode 5, which aired March 2008 was solely devoted to the assets seized by the CAB from Hutch and the threat to seize assets from his family.

In 2024, Rex Ryan brought a one-man play about Hutch, titled The Monk, to the Ambassador Theatre in Dublin. Hutch himself appeared on-stage during the play's 2026 re-run.

== Personal life ==
Hutch married Patricia Fowler in 1987, and in 1995, the couple moved from Dublin city to Clontarf. They have five children. During the 1990s, Hutch bought a number of properties in the city, converting some into rented accommodation for the Eastern Health Board.

In 1998 he was a founding member of the Corinthians Boxing Club in Dublin and has served as treasurer for the club. The club has a full gym and a boxing ring. The latter was donated by film director Jim Sheridan after making the film The Boxer.

After the CAB settlement in 1999, Hutch applied for and was granted a taxi licence, and set up the limousine service Carry Any Body. The name is a humorous reference to the Criminal Assets Bureau. He has featured in the Irish media as he has driven celebrities including Mike Tyson on their visits to Ireland.
