= Organised crime in Ireland =

Organised crime in Ireland or Irish Mob/Mafia refers to criminal activities carried out by illegal gangs and criminal organizations operating within the country and internationally. These groups engage in a wide range of illicit activities, including assault, drug trafficking, murder, bribery, loan sharking, arms trafficking and theft.

== History ==
=== 1960s ===
During the 1960s, the majority of crime in Dublin was petty crime, while murder and gun-related crime were extremely rare. There was a strong sense of community between families, and the church had an influence on creating the law-abiding state of mind in Dublin. A breeding ground for criminals was at the state-funded reform schools run by Catholic religious orders, which had harsh policies in teaching and looking after juvenile delinquents, aiming, often in vain, to turn them away from a life of crime. Martin Cahill and Christy Dunne were noted to be at these schools.

=== 1970s ===
During the 1970s, Dublin saw an increase in gun crime. One cause of the increase was the upheaval, and violence in Northern Ireland. The main culprit for bringing gun crime into Dublin was a paramilitary group called Saor Éire, which conducted multiple bank robberies to fund their organisation. During one such robbery at Allied Irish Bank, Garda officer Richard Fallon was killed. One notable person who joined Saor Éire was Christy Dunne, who would go on to establish one of the first Irish crime families, aided by his connection to organised crime in Great Britain.

Soon ordinary criminals (with little political influence), would join/cooperate with the Dunne crime family. Mainly partaking in co-operative robberies, this included Christy's eight brothers, and many recruits who would then pursue their own crime families such as Martin Cahill, John Cunningham, George Mitchell, and John Gilligan. The majority of these criminals coming from the poor and uneducated industrial slums of inner-city Dublin.

In the beginning, Dunne specialised in kidnapping. In 1978, the Dunnes broke into an Antigen pharmaceutical factory, stealing pharmaceutical drugs which would go for a high price on the black market. Due to the profit, the Dunnes would put their priorities in the drug trade as their main source of income.

What also occurred during this period is the emergence of the Provisional IRA and the Official IRA, who did the bulk of bank robberies and murder. This allowed crime families to conduct their activities under the radar.

=== 1980s ===
While the Dunnes would be the first crime family to get involved with the drug trade, money was earned in the millions in the 1980s through the heroin epidemic. It was considered easier money and more lucrative than bank robberies.

The heroin crisis destroyed communities of working-class inner-city neighbourhoods, which were once considered to be safe. Despite this many citizens protested and took their own actions against the epidemic, most notable was Concerned Parents Against Drugs. Some of these vigilantes took extreme actions such as murdering or blowing up the apartment of a believed drug-dealer.

Often Larry Dunne could not meet the demand for heroin, so many others got involved, but Larry was still considered the main source. One was Tony "King Scum" Felloni, once in the prostitution business, he would move into the drug trade. Overall there was mutual respect, and practically no conflict between crime families and drug king-pins, around the 1980s.

In 1983 Larry Dunne was finally arrested and was not able secure bail when drugs were found in his mansion. This led him to leave the country, but he was caught in 1985 in Portugal. The passing of the Criminal Justice Act made life harder for drug-traffickers. As a result, by the mid-1980s, the majority of the Dunnes were in prison or had fled.

With the end of the Dunne family, many saw it as an opportunity to join the drug trade and be number one (it was estimated to be roughly 40 groups). The person who became the next drug-kingpin was John Gilligan. Once a small-time crook, during the time of his sentencing in Portlaoise Prison he formed a mob of 6, including Bryan Meehan, Peter "Fatso" Mitchell and Paul Ward. Gilligan started off selling marijuana, since this was less of a priority for the gardai and the buyers had more money. Later Gilligan's membership would grow to a much larger number, but with that came a lack of loyalty.

The Gardaí's focus was still on paramilitary groups (with the odd taskforce combatting drugs).

=== 1990s ===
Veronica Guerin was a reporter who wrote a series of articles in the early 1990s, reporting on John Traynor, Gerry Hutch and John Gilligan. This led to Guerin being the target of multiple murder attempts. Though she survived for a time, she was eventually killed in the outskirts of Dublin on the N7 by Bryan Meehan, Peter Mitchell, Seamus Ward, and Charles Bowden, all members of Gilligan's crime syndicate. As a reaction to this murder, the Criminal Assets Bureau was formed in Ireland.

A wave of 400 subsequent arrests saw the end of Gilligan's mob. But once again this led to the rise of factions hoping to replace the leader. These included George Mitchell, Christy Kinahan and John Cunningham, often dealing with their finance overseas, in order to avoid the Criminal Assets Bureau. These events would later be depicted in the 2003 Irish film Veronica Guerin.

=== 2000s ===
By the early 2000s, many of Dublin's crime bosses had fled to Spain, due to the harsher laws combatting crime families. One of the more notable is Christy Kinahan and his mob.

In Crumlin and Drimnagh in South Dublin, a gang dispute led to two factions (one led by Freddie Thompson and the other by Brian Rattigan) engaging in a gang war with 16 people dead as a result. Rattigan was sent to prison after shooting at a police van, but continued leadership of his gang while in prison. 2005 saw the peak of the murder per day ratio, with three people killed in two days, plus a murder earlier in the year. Three people were murdered on 8 October 2007 and three more in the next two years.

=== Limerick ===
Much like Dublin, Limerick had little crime in the 1960s, despite having overcrowded neighbourhoods suffering from poverty and unemployment. Many were forced to move to Southill, which saw an increase in antisocial behaviour. No organised crime was present, but there were very disorganised gangs of youths which often committed vandalism.

Brothers Mike and Anthony Kelly committed robberies in their youth. Mike would frequently get into fights at pubs (which would later get out of hand, after someone was killed). During the pub fighting days (which he was known for) he would also take-up armed robbery and other serious crimes. Later Kelly and associates would set up protection rackets, which would also combat antisocial behaviour, by using harsh and violent action towards vandals. Every day, Mike Kelly collected a pound from each house, supplying a form of protection. The main purpose of earning money was to fund his drinking problem.

==== Limerick feud ====
During the 1990s the Keanes were considered the most powerful crime family in Limerick. The Keanes' turf was mainly Saint Mary's Park. They had neighbourhood allies being the Collopys (including Brian Collopy and Phillip Collopy). They also hired a violent hitman named Eddie Ryan, to be an enforcer. In the late nineties the drug-trade would have two major mobs. These being The Keane-Collopy (led by Christy Keane and younger violent brother Kieran Keane) and The Ryans (led by Eddie Ryan). There was a dispute between these two factions, and at one stage Eddie Ryan tried to kill Christy Keane, but his gun jammed. With motivations of revenge, the Keanes executed Ryan. This would be considered a catalyst in the Limerick feud. This led to war between the Ryans and Keanes, and eventually McCarthy-Dundon.

Another crime family would appear on the sideline, after Wayne Dundon came back from Hackney, England (as he was deported back to his home country). Wayne would form the McCarthy-Dundon gang which involved his brothers; John Dundon, Ger Dundon, and Dessie Dundon. Along with their cousins the McCarthy family. At first they would pose as allies to both The Ryans and Keane-Collopy. But in the background, schemed their own plans to defeat the two gangs. Eventually they would make their move and kill Kearan Keane (one of the bosses of the Keane-Collopy) in 2003. This would result in the demise of the Keane-Collopy's reign. And to be replaced by McCarthy-Dundon. However many murders between the factions would occur, roughly 20 killed and 100 arrested (in relation to the feud).

==== Recent years ====
Today organised crime is the main focus of police in Limerick. The number of arrests has significantly increased, and the number of crimes has significantly decreased. Gang warfare still occurs, but not as often. Turf wars over council housing/working-class estates, are particularly common in Southill (McCarthy-Dundon turf) and Saint Mary's Park (Keane-Collopy turf). Also executions or intimidation of civilians that get in the way of the crime organisations have decreased. However, the example of Ryan Collins is still not forgotten.

Many Limerick crime families' higher-ups are said to operate on a global scale. On the other hand, of the few gang gang-killings related to the Limerick feud are done by those who are in their teenage years. These teenagers also partake in drug-related crimes (such as drug-dealing for McCarthy-Dundon and Keane-Collopy crime families).

Another faction in Rathkeale, is Rathkeale Rovers, who is part of the local Rathkeale traveller community.

== Notable gangs ==
- Hutch Organised Crime Gang ( 1980s - present)
- Kinahan Organised Crime Group ( 1990s -present)
- Grendon Organised Crime Gang ( 1980s - present)
- Keane-Collopy Gang ( 1990s-present)
- McCarthy-Dundon Gang ( 2000s-present)
- Westies Gang (1990s-2000s)
- Cahill Gang (1980s-1994)
- Gilligan Network (1993 - present)
- Felloni Network (1980s-1996)
- Gucci Gang (2013-2025)
- Red Wall Gang (1980s-1990s)
