= Brian Meehan (criminal) =

Irish drug trafficker and mob enforcer

- Born: 7 April 1965 (age 61); Dublin, Ireland
- Other name: "The Tosser"
- Organization: John Gilligan gang
- Known for: murder of Veronica Guerin
- Opponent: Martin "The Viper" Foley
- Convictions: Murder; Unlawful importation of a controlled drug Possession of a controlled drug for sale or supply Unlawful possession of firearms
- Penalty: Life imprisonment

Brian Meehan (7 April 1965) is an Irish former organized crime enforcer from Crumlin, Dublin. After joining a drug trafficking gang led by John Gilligan in the early 1990's, Meehan eventually became his right hand man and was suspected of involvement in several attempted murders of rival gangsters. In July 1999, Meehan was sentenced to life imprisonment for his involvement the murder of journalist Veronica Guerin on behalf of Gilligan. As of 2026, Meehan has been turned down for early release and remains in prison.

== Background ==
Born in the working class district of Crumlin, as a teenager Meehan first got involved in petty criminality by stealing cars for joyriding around the Sundrive Park area, and later progressed to stealing cars to order for local criminals. In December 1987, Meehan was part of a gang who stole over £55,000 from a branch of AIB bank on Grafton Street, and was later sentenced to six years in prison for the robbery. Meehan was first detained in Mountjoy Prison, but was later transferred to the maximum security Portlaoise Prison for disciplinary reasons. While at Portlaoise, Meehan came into contact with serious career criminals John Gilligan and Patrick "Dutchy" Holland, and after his release in July 1994 he soon began working for Gilligan's gang. In December 1994, Meehan was suspected of involvement in a series of armed robberies involving cash-in-transit vehicles with fellow gang member Paul Ward in the Greater Dublin Area, with an incident in Tallaght resulting in £130,000 being taken at gunpoint. Gardaí believed the two men staged the robberies in order to buy their way into Gilligan's drug trafficking operation by providing the downpayment for the first batch of narcotics.

== Gilligan drug trafficking gang ==
After his release from prison in November 1993, Gilligan first began smuggling tobacco, and soon afterwards began working with major Dublin drug traffickers such as Ecstasy dealer Peter Mitchell. Gilligan also sourced a major supplier of cannabis resin from mainland Europe, and arranged for criminal associates in The Netherlands to have boxes labeled "spare parts" sent in containers to the Port of Cork, where after first being waved through customs by corrupt shipping executive John Dunne, the consignment would then be transported to the Ambassador Hotel on the outskirts of Naas for handover to gang member Charles Bowden. Bowden thereafter brought the consignments to a warehouse rented on behalf of Gilligan at the Greenmount Industrial Estate in Harold's Cross, then gang members sold the hashish onto distributors around Dublin for an average of £2,200 per kilogram. Irish authorities later calculated that Gilligan had imported over 20,000 kilograms of cannabis resin via the Port of Cork between July 1994 and October 1996, with an estimated street value of £180 million. In a 2023 interview, John Gilligan claimed that he personally made over £10 million in profits from importing and distributing cannabis resin in the mid-1990s.

While other gang members distributed the drugs and collected payments, Meehan was promoted to Gilligan's right hand man and was entrusted to be his main enforcer while managing other gang members and dealing with rival criminals. Meehan ruthlessly looked after Gilligan's interests and was suspected of carrying out a number of failed assassinations, allegedly including two attempts on Martin "The Viper" Foley Fellow gang member Charles Bowden, who was the gang's quartermaster, would later testify that in February 1996 he serviced and loaded a MAC-10 machine pistol that Meehan allegedly used in an attempt on Foley's life in the south inner city area of The Liberties. Foley himself later described how despite being hit in the back by a .45 ACP round, he managed to escape by running inside a house and then jumping from an upstairs window, with Meehan chasing him all the time and firing dozens of bullets at him.

== Murder of Veronica Guerin ==
Journalist Veronica Guerin was well known in Ireland for investigating organized crime, and had been attacked on several occasions in relation to her articles. On 14 September 1995, John Gilligan was doorstepped by Veronica Guerin at his Jessbrook Equestrian Centre in Enfield, County Meath to ask him about his source of income. Gilligan physically assaulted Guerin and chased her off the property, and the next day rang her mobile phone to threaten her with being shot if she wrote any articles about him. Gilligan's threats were overheard by her barrister, Felix McElroy, who went with Guerin to make an official statement to Gardaí, from the result of which Gilligan was charged with assault.

Gilligan's assault case caused huge concern within his drugs gang, as he was the only one that had business dealings with the European sources of the hashish and if he went to prison they feared that their entire drug importation system would collapse. Brian Meehan was later quoted by Charles Bowden in saying that Gilligan had said "he was going to have something done about her". On the evening of 25 June 1996, gang members Charles Bowden, Brian Meehan and Peter Mitchell met at the Greenmount Industrial Estate, where Bowden serviced and then loaded a Colt Python revolver with .357 Magnum semiwadcutter bullets. On the same day, John Gilligan departed from Dublin and flew to Amsterdam via commercial airline.

1 Naas Court House
2 Murder site on Naas Road

On the morning of 26 June 1996, Guerin appeared at Naas District Court on a speeding charge. At around 12:30pm, she left the courthouse to drive her red Opel Calibra back to Dublin. During this time, Guerin was under covert surveillance by gang member Russell Warren, who was in constant phone contact with both John Gilligan and Brian Meehan giving updates to her location. Warren would later recall that when speaking to Meehan, who had a hands free phone, he could hear the sound of a motorbike engine at all times. At around 12:55pm, Guerin stopped at a red traffic light on the Naas Dual Carriageway near Newlands Cross. A Kawasaki motorbike with two passengers suddenly stopped beside her car, then the pillion passenger smashed her driver side window with the butt of a handgun before opening fire six times, killing Guerin almost instantly. In July 1996, assault charges were officially struck out against Gilligan due to the death of the only witness in the case, Veronica Guerin.

== Arrest and extradition ==
In October 1996, Meehan fled Ireland and moved frequently around mainland Europe. However on 10 October 1997 Meehan was arrested in Amsterdam after undercover Garda officers trailed a female associate from Dublin to Schipol Airport, where they were both arrested outside Centraal train station by Dutch SWAT team members shortly after her flight landed. During extradition proceedings, Meehan claimed he left Ireland due to adverse media pressure and would not receive a fair trial if he returned due to Guerin's journalist colleagues continuing to print articles linking him to John Gilligan. However, the Dutch authorities ultimately ruled Meehan would be guaranteed a fair trial under the European Convention on Human Rights and granted the extradition request from the Irish Department of Justice.

On 3 September 1998, Meehan was officially handed over to Garda officers at Eindhoven Airport and finally extradited to Dublin. After being arrested at Baldonnel Aerodrome, he was brought to the Special Criminal Court and charged with the murder of Veronica Guerin. He was also charged with possession of firearms (a Sten submachine gun, a silenced Agran 2000 machine pistol, five Walther semi-automatic pistols) and over a thousand rounds of ammunition with intent to endanger life, as well as drug trafficking offences. Security was tight at the hearing, with members of the Garda Emergency Response Unit locking down the building during proceedings.

== Trial ==
At the opening of Meehan's trial on 2 June 1999, lead Prosecutor Peter Charleton SC described to the trial judges how Charles Bowden, who had turn state's witness in return for immunity from prosecution, had given a sworn statement that Meehan ordered him to prepare a Colt Python handgun the day before Veronica Guerin's murder and later confessed to him that he drove the Kawasaki motorbike used in the fatal shooting. Meehan had also informed Bowden that he had offered to kill Guerin himself, but a more experienced assassin was selected for the job instead.

=== Garda investigations ===
Guerin had been leaving a voicemail on a Garda contact's phone while she was stopped at a red light just before her murder, and the court was played the recording which abruptly ended after a series of gunshots. State pathologist Dr. John Harbison told the court that Guerin suffered six gunshot wounds, and that the cause of her death was the laceration of the subclavian artery resulting in rapid blood loss. Detective Sergeant Patrick Ennis testified how he examined bullets recovered from Guerin's car and during her autopsy, which turned out to be .357 calibre of semiwadcutter type. These matched a batch of bullets recovered from the grave of 'Miriam Norcot' at the Jewish cemetery at Old Court Road on the outskirts of Tallaght, which the gang used as an arms dump and Bowden had alerted the authorities to. A Garda raid on the gang's warehouse at the Greenmount Industrial Estate recovered a camouflage patterned pouch designed to hold an Agram 2000 machine pistol and matching silencer, and Det Sgt Ennis asserted that the pouch matched the Agram recovered from the same arms cache.

Detective Sergeant Fergus Treanor testified how in October 1996 he arrested Bowden and his girlfriend Juliet Bacon at their house in Ashtown, where a set of keys to the unit at the Greenmount Industrial Estate were recovered. A large quantity of cannabis resin was found there, and the warehouse owner picked Bowden out of a montage of photos as the man who signed the lease in November 1995. Detective Garda Brendan Howley testified that a counterfeit driving licence recovered from the warehouse was dusted for fingerprints, and a right thumbprint on it matched Meehan's records. The court also heard an April 1997 covert recording from a payphone in a pub on Blackhorse Avenue, where Meehan threatened Bacon with death after learning Bowden was imprisoned at Arbour Hill Prison and deducing he was co-operating with the authorities. Detective Garda Colm Church, who was present in the pub while the phone call was recorded, told the court how he taken sworn statements from Bowden twice before this incident, in October 1996 and again in Arbour Hill Prison in March 1997.

Also present at the two interrogations was Detective Inspector John O'Mahony, who testified that in October 1996 Bowden said Meehan confessed to him on the day Guerin was shot that he had driven the motorbike and that a man referred to as 'The Wig' (a.k.a Patrick "Dutchy" Holland) was the pillion passenger who fired the fatal shots. In his March 1997 statement, Bowden said he heard a radio news report on the day in question about a woman being shot and he instinctively knew it was Guerin.

=== Witness statements ===
State witness Julian Clohessy, who was a friend of both Meehan and Bowden, told the court how in July 1996 he was out socialising at POD nightclub on Harcourt Street when Meehan allegedly confessed he was there at the murder scene on the day in question, and that Guerin's last words were "Don't shoot me in face". Juliet Bacon testified that in early 1996 Bowden started hanging out with Brian Meehan and Paul Ward, and Bowden would often count large amounts of money at their house before meeting up with Meehan to hand it over. Bacon admitted Bowden told her in advance that his associates were unhappy with the articles Guerin was writing and that she was going to be threatened, however she claimed to be unaware that the gang was planning to murder her.

=== Bowden testimony ===
Taking the stand to give evidence for the prosecution, Charles Bowden testified how Meehan ordered him to rent out the warehouse at the Greenmount Industrial Estate the gang used as a drugs distribution center, as well as bringing him to the Jewish cemetery on Old Court Road to show him the grave they used as an arms dump. Bowden described how they moved up to 500 kilos of cannabis from each shipment, and that he earned as much as £6,000 a week distributing hash for the gang. Bowden asserted that Meehan ordered him to prepare a .357 Magnum revolver for use the day before Guerin's murder, and later bragged to him in a pub how he escaped up the Belgard Road on the motorbike after her shooting. Bowden told the court he thought the gang were only going to intimidate Guerin and denied having advance knowledge she was going to be murdered. Bowden also told the court how he purposely frequented his girlfriend's hairdresser business on Moore Street on the day of the shooting so as to have an alibi in case of arrest. Under cross examination from defence lawyer John McCrudden QC, Bowden denied it was he who had murdered Guerin and thereafter made false statements to Gardaí implicating Meehan.

=== Warren testimony ===
Taking the stand to give evidence for the prosecution, fellow gang member Russell Warren testified how in May 1996 he stole a motorbike to order for Meehan, then went to Naas on the day in question to keep look out for Guerin leaving the courthouse. Warren then described how he was in phone contact with Meehan as he trailed Guerin's car giving live updates on her location, and that a short time later he witnesses a pillion passenger of a motorbike shoot through the driver side window of the car while it was stopped at traffic lights. Under cross examination from the defence, Warren denied he knew that Guerin was to be murdered when he followed her that morning, and while he admitted to continue working with the gang afterwards he asserted that he was afraid of repercussions from the drugs gang's leader if he left.

=== Defence submissions ===
At the close of the prosecution's case, Meehan's lead council John McCrudden QC applied for a direction of not guilty on the grounds of insufficient evidence to convict. However, the trial judges declared that prima facie evidence had been established against the accused and called upon Meehan to enter his defence. Only one witness was called by the defence, Greenmount Industrial Estate employee Joe Higgins, who claimed he never encountered Meehan the entire time he worked there.

=== Closing Statements ===
Prosecutor Eamon Leahy SC told the court that Meehan played a central role in a criminal gang that imported and distributed hundreds of kilograms of cannabis resin several times a month. Multiple co-operating witnesses had testified that Meehan managed the transportation of the consignments from Cork to Naas, then orchestrated the distribution of the 9 ounce bars of hash from the warehouse in Harolds Cross, the result of which netted the gang hundreds of thousands of pounds in profits on a weekly basis. Meehan's fingerprints being recovered from the Greenmount Industrial Estate unit provided a physical link to the gang's headquarters, while the recording of his threats to have Charles Bowden killed if he co-operated demonstrated a willingness to resort to violence to protect the gang's interests. Leahy SC asserted that Guerin's murder must be viewed in the context of a massive drug dealing conspiracy and the enormous financial rewards it produced for the gang.

Defence lawyer John McCrudden QC stated that the case against Meehan was based on the testimony of a number of criminal accomplices who had turned state's witness and attempted to shift the blame wholly on his client in to order to reduce their own culpability, adding that their evidence was full of contradictions and inconsistency. McCrudden QC asserted that Charles Bowden was the actual gunman who shot Guerin, highlighting that with his previous military training on the use of firearms as a former Irish army N.C.O. suited him to the task and that Meehan was picked as the fall guy due to his close association with John Gilligan.

=== Verdict ===
On 29 July 1999, Brian Meehan was found guilty as charged and sentenced to life imprisonment by the Special Criminal Court for the murder of Veronica Guerin, after the court ruled that he drove the motorbike that carried the hitman who shot her. Meehan was also given concurrent sentences totaling 20 years for drug trafficking and firearms offences. The judgement handed down by the non-jury court highlighted Russell Warren's evidence as crucial in proving Meehan's fundamental role in the planning and execution of Guerin's murder, and that his testimony was supported by an eyewitness who seen Warren using a mobile phone in Naas on the morning in question. Regarding Charles Bowden, the court accepted his evidence regarding Meehan's drugs and firearms offences as clear and convincing, however his testimony regarding the murder of Guerin was deemed to be vague and evasive, and thus needed to be disregarded as unreliable.

=== Failed Appeal ===
On 24 July 2006, the Court of Appeal rejected an application by Meehan for his convictions to be quashed. Defence lawyer Patrick Gageby argued that telephone traffic between Meehan and Russell Warren's mobile phones on the day of the murder should not have been accepted as evidence at his trial, however State counsel Peter Charleton argued that the pattern and timing of the calls between the two men backed up Warren's testimony. In dismissing the appeal, the court ruled that the call logs matched Warren's description of a "search-and-follow" operation precisely, while there was abundant additional evidence that Meehan was an integral part of John Gilligan's drug trafficking organization.

== Release from prison ==
In 2021, Meehan was moved from the maximum security Portlaoise Prison to Shelton Abbey Prison, which ran an open prison model in order to re-integrate inmates back into society. In late 2023, Meehan was applied for and was denied parole. In 2025, media reports indicated that Meehan had been moved to an independent living unit within Shelton Abbey, which were designed to help long-serving prisoners prepare for release into the community, as well as being allowed out of the prison unaccompanied to attend a training course.

== Fate of other gang members ==
Although he never faced charges in relation to her death, the Gardaí prime suspect for the person who fired the fatal shots was Patrick "Dutchy" Holland, (he would also be identified by Charles Bowden as the person who killed Guerin in a later trial).In November 1997, Holland was sentenced to 20 years in prison for drug trafficking on behalf of the gang after Bowden testified how he supplied him with an average of 35 kilograms of hashish on a weekly basis.

Paul Ward was sentenced to life imprisonment in November 1998, after being found guilty of disposing of the motorbike and handgun used in Guerin's assassination. Bowden had testified that Ward confessed to him that the killer, who he named as Patrick 'Dutchy' Holland, had left the murder weapon in his house shortly after the shooting.However, in 2002 the Court of Appeal overturned Ward's conviction after judges ruled the evidence of Charles Bowden could not be relied upon and that after his testimony was disregarded there was no other evidence to prove the hit team had returned to Ward's house in Walkinstown after Guerin's murder.

Despite former gang members testifying that he was the mastermind behind her death, in 2002 John Gilligan was tried and acquitted of the murder of Veronica Guerin. However, Gilligan was found guilty of drug trafficking and sentenced to 28 years in prison by the Special Criminal Court. after Bowden testified that Gilligan had directed his distribution of drugs and firearms.In a 2023 interview, Gilligan claimed Brian Meehan had confessed to him that John "the Coach" Traynor ordered Guerin's murder as she was about to write an article accusing Traynor of dealing heroin, and that Charles Bowden carried out the actual shooting while Meehan himself drove the getaway motorbike.

In return for testifying against his fellow gang members, Charles Bowden agreed a plea deal with the Irish authorities where he would plead guilty to drugs and firearms offences in return for immunity from prosecution for his involvement in Guerin's murder. Sentenced to six years in jail, he was held under armed protection in a special secure four-cell unit at Arbour Hill Prison alongside John Dunne and Russell Warren, who also gave evidence against the drug gang. After his release from prison in April 2001, Bowden and his second wife relocated abroad into a foreign state's witness protection programme.
