= Charles Bowden (criminal) =

First supergrass to enter the Republic of Ireland's witness protection programme

Charles Bowden (born 1965) is a convicted Irish criminal, who after turning state's witness in the murder of journalist Veronica Guerin, was the first person to enter Ireland's Witness Security Programme.

== Early life ==
Born in Finglas in 1965, Bowden left school at the age of 15 and joined the Irish Army in 1983. In the late 1980s, Bowden won an award for being the top rifle marksman in the army's Eastern Command, and had also served as a peacekeeper with UNIFIL in Lebanon. Rising to the rank of corporal, he gained a black belt in karate but was dishonorably discharged in 1989 after beating up seven new recruits, two of whom needed hospitalization.

== Criminal career ==
Having separated from his first wife and two children and unable to pay child support, Bowden began working as a doorman at the Hogan Stand public house on the North Circular Road, Dublin in 1993. While training at a kickboxing gym in Buckingham Street, Bowden made contact with one of Dublin's biggest Ecstasy traffickers, and thereafter started dealing drugs to customers he met while working at the Hogan Stand, earning around £500 a week from selling Ecstasy tablets.

Bowden eventually left his job as a doorman and began distributing wholesale quantities of cannabis resin across Dublin for John Gilligan's gang. Criminal associates of Gilligan in The Netherlands arranged for boxes labeled "spare parts" to be sent in containers to the Port of Cork, where after first being waved through customs by corrupt shipping executive John Dunne, the consignment would then be transported to the Ambassador Hotel on the outskirts of Naas for handover to Bowden. Irish authorities later estimated that over 20,000 kilograms of cannabis resin, with an estimated street value of £180 million, was illegally imported via this method between July 1994 and October 1996. Bowden thereafter brought the consignment to a unit the gang rented at the Greenmount Industrial Estate in Harold's Cross, then sold the hashish onto distributors for an average of £2,200 per kilogram. Bowden later estimated he made up to £7,000 a week in commissions by distributing cannabis for John Gilligan. Bowden also ran a hairdressing salon named Clipps on Moore Street around the same time period.

As he had experience of maintaining military-grade firearms during his army career, Bowden also became the gang's quartermaster. Around eight arms shipments were sent alongside the drugs, and after bringing them to Bridget Bourke's pub for other gang members to inspect, Bowden hid the weapons in the grave of 'Miriam Norcot' at the Jewish cemetery at Old Court Road on the outskirts of Tallaght. In February 1996, Bowden serviced and loaded a MAC-10 machine pistol that fellow gang member Brian Meehan allegedly used during the attempted murder of Martin "The Viper" Foley in the south inner city area of The Liberties. A few months later, Bowden cleaned and loaded the .357 Magnum pistol used to kill Veronica Guerin, which he believed would be used by Patrick "Dutchy" Holland only to threaten her.

After the murder of Guerin, Bowden, like the other members of Gilligan's gang who were still in Ireland, was arrested. Bowden confessed the location of the gang's arms dump to Gardaí, and when the grave at the Jewish cemetery was searched they recovered a haul of arms and ammunition, including: a Sten submachine gun, an Agram 2000 submachine gun, five Walther semi-automatic pistols, silencers and over a thousand rounds of ammunition. Gardaí also raided the gang's rented unit at the Greenmount Industrial Estate and discovered cardboard boxes containing hundreds of "9 (ounce) bars" of cannabis resin. Authorities estimated that the boxes held approximately 975 kilograms of hashish.

== Informant ==
In an agreement with the Attorney General of Ireland, Bowden agreed to turn state's witness and become the first person to enter the country's witness protection programme. Granted complete immunity from prosecution for the murder of Guerin, Bowden gave evidence (along with fellow gang member Russell Warren) as a supergrass against the top four drug gang members at their trials in the Special Criminal Court:

- Patrick "Dutchy" Holland - found guilty in November 1997 of drug trafficking and sentenced to 20 years in prison. Bowden had testified how he supplied Holland with an average of 35 kilograms of hashish on a weekly basis.
- Paul Ward - found guilty in November 1998 of disposing of the motorbike and handgun used in the murder of Veronica Guerin and sentenced to life imprisonment. Bowden testified that Ward had confessed to him that the killer, who he named as Patrick 'Dutchy' Holland, had left the murder weapon in his house shortly after the shooting. However, in 2002 the Court of Appeal overturned Ward's conviction after judges ruled the evidence of Charles Bowden could not be relied upon and that after his testimony was disregarded there was no other evidence to prove the hit team had returned to Ward's house in Walkinstown after Guerin's murder.
- Brian Meehan - found guilty in July 1999 of driving the motorbike that carried the hitman who shot Veronica Guerin and sentenced to life imprisonment. Bowden testified that Meehan ordered him to prepare a Colt Python handgun the day before her murder and later confessed to him that he drove the Kawasaki motorbike used in the fatal shooting.
- John Gilligan - found guilty in March 2001 of drug trafficking and sentenced to 28 years in prison. Bowden testified that Gilligan had directed his distribution of drugs and firearms.

Bowden was subsequently prosecuted and found guilty for drugs and firearms offences. Sentenced to six years in jail, he was held under armed protection in a special secure four-cell unit at Arbour Hill Prison alongside John Dunne and Russell Warren, who also gave evidence against the drug gang members.

It was confirmed by the Attorney General of Ireland's office in April 2001 that Bowden had been released from jail. Following discussions with foreign state witness protection programmes, Bowden and his second wife had been relocated abroad. The family had been provided with a house, the mortgage for which was to be paid by the state, and Bowden was given a job compatible with his abilities and education. It is an offence under Irish law to try to contact him or to publish his whereabouts.

== See also ==
- Criminal Assets Bureau (CAB)
