= Catherine Nevin =

Irish murderer (1950–2018)

- Born: Catherine Scully; 1 October 1950; Dublin, Ireland
- Died: 19 February 2018 (aged 67); Dublin, Ireland
- Other name: The Black Widow
- Status: Received compassionate release in late 2017, having served 17 years in jail.
- Conviction: Murder
- Penalty: Life imprisonment

Details
- Victims: 1
- Weapon: Shotgun (by proxy)

Location of the murder site in Ireland

Catherine Nevin (née Scully; 1 October 1950 – 19 February 2018) was an Irish woman who was convicted of arranging to have her husband Tom Nevin murdered in a suspected contract killing at Jack White's Inn, a pub owned by the couple in County Wicklow, in 1996. She was convicted of his murder in 2000 and the jury in her trial also found her guilty on three charges of soliciting others to kill him after five days of deliberation, then the longest period of deliberation in the history of the Irish State. She was subsequently dubbed the Black Widow by the press. Nevin was the subject of significant coverage by the tabloid press and Justice Mella Carroll ordered a ban on the press commenting on Nevin's appearance or demeanour during the trial.

== Early life ==
Born on 1 October 1950, Catherine Scully lived on a farm near Nurney, County Kildare, before getting a job as a receptionist at the Castle Hotel on Great Denmark Street in Dublin City. She later met County Galway native Tom Nevin in Dublin in 1970 and they were married in Rome in 1976. Within ten years, they owned several investment properties around Dublin and took over the lease of the Barry House pub in Finglas, where a number of Irish Republicans were regular customers. In 1986, the Nevin's bought Jack White's Inn near Brittas Bay for £270,000. They then added a new restaurant to the premises, as well as converting some of bedrooms into bed and breakfast accommodation.

== Murder of Tom Nevin ==
On 19 March 1996, Tom Nevin was shot dead with a shotgun while counting the day's takings in Jack White's pub near Brittas Bay in County Wicklow. According to his wife Catherine Nevin, she was woken by someone pressing her face into a pillow. She said: "It was a man shouting: 'f**king jewellery, f**king kill ya'. He had a knife in his left hand. Everything in the room was coming down around." Over IR£16,000 in cash was taken from the pub, and the Nevins' car was stolen and later found abandoned in the Ranelagh suburb of Dublin.

Gardaí were suspicious of the circumstances of the "robbery" almost immediately, due to discrepancies in the crime scene and in Catherine Nevin's own statements. Gunshot wounds on Tom Nevin's body suggested he had been shot at extremely close range while sitting in a chair counting money with his hands raised above his head in surrender, which ruled out an accidental shooting while resisting an armed robbery. Detectives were also puzzled why Catherine had not gone looking for Tom for help getting untied instead of triggering a panic button at the front door and then waiting there for Gardaí to arrive. Later interviews conducted by Garda officers with the staff at Jack White's Inn also revealed that the Nevin's had a troubled marriage and slept in separate bedrooms, as well as that Catherine had several extra-marital affairs and seemingly didn't care if her husband knew about them.

On 27 July 1996, Catherine Nevin was arrested on suspicion of withholding information regarding the murder of her husband Tom. However, she maintained her right to silence by refusing to answer any questions and was released without charge 48 hours later. On the same day, former armed robber Gerry Heapes was arrested under Section 30 of the Offensives Against the State Act in relation to Tom Nevin's murder, before also being released without charge. On 14 April 1997, Catherine Nevin was charged with her husband's murder at Dublin District Court and then remanded in custody. She was additionally charged with having solicited three other people (William McClean, Gerry Heapes and John Jones) to murder her husband between 1989 and 1990 also. Nevin was later granted bail by the High Court on condition she signed on at Wicklow Garda station three times a week and not interfere with any witnesses in the case.

Jack White's Inn was sold for £620,000 in late 1997, and along with the rest of Tom Nevins estate (£800,000 from property sales, £78,000 insurance policy payout and £197,000 in cash) was subject to High Court proceedings from Tom's siblings to prevent Catherine from benefiting financially from it.

== Trial ==
On 14 January 2000, Catherine Nevin went on trial at the Central Criminal Court in Dublin before Justice Mella Carroll. Nevin plead not guilty to the murder of her husband Tom Nevin, and also to three counts of soliciting others to murder him on various dates before his death.

=== Opening Statements ===
Chief prosecutor Peter Charleton S.C. outlined to a jury of six men and six women how Tom Nevin was the victim of a contract killing, disguised as a botched robbery, that was organized by his wife Catherine, who as well as having a deep dislike for him had a primary financial motive of wanting to gain full control of their business. Although the State did not have evidence on who exactly carried out the actual killing, strong circumstantial evidence would be presented that would prove Catherine was the mastermind behind her husband's death, along with eyewitness evidence from three separate individuals who she had previously approached asking them to murder her husband. Charleton S.C. also highlighted unusual incidents on the night in question, such as the pub alarm system not being switched on after closing time and the fact that, despite allegedly being tied up by her hands and ankles, Catherine made her way to the front door to activate a panic alarm instead of using a similar panic button in her bedroom.

=== Prosecution evidence ===
After dropping two customers home, Tom Nevin returned to Jack White's Inn to count the takings from the busy Saint Patrick's Day Bank Holiday weekend. Examination of the cash registers showed he started totaling the money at 12:56am on the morning of Tuesday 19 March 1996. James Curry, who monitored alarms for Bell Communications security company, testified to the court how at 4:31am that morning a panic alarm was activated at Jack White's Inn, and he immediately rang Wexford Garda station to alert them. Garda Sean Whelan told the court how he received the call and thereafter sent out an alert for Gardaí to locate the Nevin's black Opel Omega car, incase it was somehow linked to the ongoing incident at the pub. Garda Sergeant Martin McAndrew and Detective Garda Paul Comiskey arrivied at the scene at 4:45am, where they found Catherine Nevin bound and gagged behind the slightly open front door of the pub, who informed them that a man wearing a balaclava had apprehended her in her bedroom while armed with a knife. While her bedroom was ransacked, Gardaí found no evidence of ransacking in the other bedrooms or any of the rooms in the downstairs premises. An examination of the crime scene found all external doors and windows to be locked with no signs of forced entry, only the front door was unlocked and open, while the alarm system was also found to have been switched off. Several floor safes were found unlocked and empty, with Nevin estimating that £16,000 in cash from the weekend's takings was missing. Garda Sergeant McAndrew found the dead body of Tom Nevin approximately 80 feet away in the kitchen, and noticed that despite the obvious gunshot wounds there was no smell of any gunsmoke, which he found unusual.

State pathologist Doctor John Harbison testified how Tom Nevin had died from a single shotgun blast to the torso. Nevin was shot from less than 3 feet away under his right armpit, with the pellets crossing the chest through his heart and lungs, causing an instant catastrophic blood loss to his brain and rapid death thereafter. Doctor Harbison remarked that although the caliber appeared to be common twelve gauge, the pellets themselves were much larger than usual, possibly of buckshot type, with 6 individual pellets having caused 4 large exit wounds to Nevin's body. Detective Garda William Brennan informed the court how the pellets recovered from the crime scene were approximately 8.38 millimeters in diameter, and appeared to be from "SG" size cartridges.

Assistant Garda Commissioner Jim McHugh testified how he arrived at Jack White's Inn at 9:30am on the morning in question, where he interviewed Catherine Nevin after first having briefly inspected the crime scene. According to AGC McHugh, when asked to recall what happened, Nevin claimed a hooded man woke her up demanding her jewellery, while pushing her head into a pillow. She then had her hands tied behind her back, and her wrists were then tied to her ankles. After a while she heard the sound of two cars driving off from outside the pub, after which she managed to partially wriggle free and activate a downstairs alarm. She didn't know where Tom was or what happened to him until the Garda officers that arrived informed her he was dead in the kitchen, adding that she did not hear the fatal gunshot either. AGC McHugh revealed that on the day of Tom Nevin's funeral, Catherine had mentioned to him that the smell of incense in the church reminded her of the odor of cordite she had smelled in the kitchen where Tom was killed. This made him immediately suspicious as she had previously denied having been in the kitchen before Garda had arrived, and any smell of gunsmoke would only have been apparent for a short time after the fatal shot had been fired. AGC McHugh returned to Jack White's Inn on 23 March 1996 for another interview with Nevin, where she claimed her husband Tom was an alcoholic who was sometimes violent towards her. Although Nevin initially refused to give an official witness statement, asserting that she didn't trust officers based in Arklow Garda station, Nevin later gave a statement to Detective Garda Joe Collins after receiving legal advice. Defence lawyers claimed that Nevin's reluctance was due to earlier sexual assault allegations in July 1991 by a teenaged female relative of Tom Nevin against officers from Arklow Garda station, which resulted in two Gardaí being suspended from work.

Detective Garda Thomas Carey described to the court how he and Detective Garda William Brennan later carried out ballistic tests in the kitchen where Tom Nevin was found dead, in order to determine the noise levels generated during his murder. After first positioning other Gardaí in various rooms of the pub, the two detectives first fired a normal long barreled shotgun and then a sawn-off shotgun into a retrieval box. Detective Garda Carey confirmed all of the shots could be heard throughout the premises, regardless if any of the internal doors were opened or closed. Detective Garda Carey also noted that a mobile panic alarm was found on a window sill of the bedroom where Catherine Nevin was allegedly tied up by whoever shot her husband, which was found to be fully working whether the pub alarm system was activated or not. Detective Garda Joe Collins testified how he and Detective Garda Sergeant Fergus O'Brien had interviewed Nevin in her sitting room at Jack White's Inn on 12 April 1996, and when she briefly left the room they both inspected an open address book with the name and telephone number of Gerry Heapes visible on the page. The detectives found Nevin having Heapes's contact details to be highly unusual, as he was known to Gardaí for being a former member of the Provisional Irish Republican Army with convictions for armed robbery. However, when Detective Garda Collins later examined the same address book on 18 May 1996 this name and number had been scribbled out.

=== Original jury discharged ===
On 26 January 2000, which was the ninth day of Nevin's trial, Justice Mella Carroll called a halt to proceedings after it was brought to her attention that some of the jury deliberations had been overheard by individuals in the public gallery, and therefore she had no option but to discharge the entire jury so as to preserve the secrecy of the justice process. Although the exact circumstances of the incident was never made clear, it was speculated that a newly installed fire door between the jury room and the public gallery was not properly soundproofed, thus allowing those in the public gallery to be aware of jury deliberations. On 7 February 2000, a new jury consisting of nine women and three men were sworn in for a re-trial of Catherine Nevin, with Justice Mella Carroll warning the jury not to be swayed by any previous publicity but to only rely on the facts presented in court.

=== Trial resumes ===
On 15 February 2000, the trial resumed at the Central Criminal Court. Reiterating his earlier opening statement, Peter Charleton S.C. informed the jury that the State would prove Tom Nevin was murdered in a contract killing orchestrated by his wife, adding the pub's substantial Bank Holiday takings stolen in the "robbery" was in fact the cash pay-off for the hitman who carried out the shooting. Detective Garda Paul Comiskey also repeated his account of arriving on the scene to find Catherine Nevin tied up behind the open front door of the pub. Garda John Heraghty testified how he inspected the doors and windows of Jack White's Inn, and that none showed any signs of forced entry. Ballistics evidence regarding the type of ammunition Tom Nevin was shot with was also repeated to the court by Detective Garda William Brennan. In response to Detective Garda Collins describing how Gerry Heapes details were scratched out of an address book, defence lawyer Patrick MacEntee S.C. countered that Heapes had previously enquired about renting an apartment from the Nevin's and that his details were erased after he and Catherine had an argument.

Taking the stand to give evidence for the prosecution, Gerry Heapes admitted to being an IRA member in the mid-1970s, who was convicted of the armed robbery of a cash-and-carry store in 1977, and was working as a doorman by the early 1990s. Heapes told the court how his homecoming party on release from prison was held in the Barry House pub, and that he was invited to the grand opening of Jack White's Inn after the Nevins had bought it. Heapes claimed that Nevin approached him on nearly a dozen different occasions over a three-month period in 1990 asking him to kill Tom or if he could find someone else to carry out the murder on his behalf. According to Heapes, he was offered £25,000 to perform the hit, which was later increased to £40,000. Heapes asserted that Nevin suggested to him that he should ambush her husband while he was either depositing the pub's takings at the bank or when he was collecting rent from a block of flats he owned on the South Circular Road, Dublin. Nevin even offered to accompany her husband while he was attempting to deposit the cash, saying that it would look great if Tom "was to die in my arms". Heapes claimed he kept coming up with excuses as to why it could not be done, and eventually Catherine Nevin abruptly cut contact with him.

John Jones, who was a former Sinn Féin member, testified that in 1990 he was approached by Catherine Nevin at his shop in Finglas and asked to arrange for the IRA to murder her husband. According to Jones, he was informed by Nevin that the pub would usually take in over £25,000 in cash during a Bank Holiday weekend, and that Tom would deposit the takings at a bank in Dublin on the following Tuesday, suggesting a robbery gone wrong could be staged while he was travelling to the bank. When challenged as to why he did not inform the police or warn Tom Nevin about the conspiracy against his life, Jones claimed he thought Nevin could have been an agent provocateur sent by rouge Garda officers. Ballinode native William McClean, who claimed to have had an extra marital affair with Nevin in the mid-1980s, told the court how in 1990 Catherine had asked him to visit her at St. Vincent's Private Hospital where she was undergoing treatment. McClean claimed that Nevin asked him to arrange for someone to murder her husband Tom for a payment of £20,000. McClean asserted that Nevin had also recommended to him that an ambush on her husband could be planned for when he was depositing the pub's takings or during his weekly rent money collecting. As well as hoping to gain financially from her husband's death, Nevin allegedly told McClean that she still had romantic feelings for him and that they could get back together if Tom was out of the picture. Under cross examination, McClean admitted he had previous minor convictions for cheque fraud, however he denied accusations that he was a professional criminal who specialized in cheque kiting

Several members of staff from Jack White's Inn also gave evidence about events leading up to Tom Nevins' murder. Caroline Strahan testified that the Nevin's marriage was effectively over and they were sleeping in separate bedrooms. Strahan asserted that Catherine was also having an affair with Garda Inspector Tom Kennedy, adding that she had witnessed them in bed on a number of occasion, and that Tom Nevin had full knowledge of this. Bernie Fleming also gave evidence of Nevin having numerous affairs with several men. Brendan McGraynor recounted an incident in early February 1996 where someone rang to book a room for the upcoming Saint Patrick's Day weekend, however Catherine Nevin instructed him to refuse the booking as they had nothing available, despite records showing all rooms were free on that weekend. Catherine McGraynor told the court how on the night of the murder staff were informed no one was allowed to stay overnight in spare rooms above the pub. McGraynor found this unusual, as they had always previously been allowed to stay after the local nightclub had shut. Jessica Hunter described how on the day before the murder, Catherine Nevin appeared agitated and jumpy, as if she anticipated something terrible was going to happen. After finding out that Hunter was talking to the police, Nevin had become enraged and accused her of being paid to tell lies about her. Another employee, Jeanie Murphy, described how Nevin had threatened Hunter for talking to the police, and had told Murphy she could not sack Hunter "in case she gives them more fucking information". Agnes Phelan testified that the night before the murder, Catherine Nevin had told her she was going to "fucking sort Tom Nevin out". Oona Dooguein, who had worked for the Nevins the year before the murder, recalled that Catherine Nevin had predicted that Tom would get himself killed in the course of a break-in. Other witnesses testified about Catherine and Tom Nevin's constant fighting, which persisted right up to Tom's murder, that Tom was afraid of Catherine, and that on at least one occasion they had seen heavily bandaged injuries on Tom's face after an argument with Catherine.

=== Defence submissions ===
On 14 March 2000, Catherine Nevin took the stand to give evidence in her own defence, where she dismissed accusations of her having affairs with district court judge Donnchadh O'Buachalla and Garda Inspector Tom Kennedy while married to her husband, adding that she and Tom had a loving relationship and were frequently intimate with each other. She also alleged that Tom Nevin was a member of the IRA, a fact she only learned a few years after they married. Nevin also vehemently denied having arranged her husband's death, along with three counts of soliciting to murder, or telling witness Donncha Long that she had a deep dislike for Tom because she considered him to be a closet homosexual. Nevin went on to describe the night of the robbery, and how a masked raider tied her up before she managed to trigger a panic button alerting Gardaí.

Under cross examination, Nevin denied trying to divert attention by placing blame on the IRA for her husband's murder, while also denying that their marriage was a troubled one. Nevin also denied paying staff by cheque on the day before the murder in order to maximize the amount of cash on premises during the subsequent "robbery", or telling staff members they could not return to stay over after The Tunnel nightclub in Arklow (as per usual arrangement) on the night her husband was killed either. In response to allegations from her employee Oona Dooguein that in July 1995 she had remarked that Tom would meet his death either by drink driving or resisting a robbery, Nevin clarified that because her husband was often drunk afterhours he would not be able to follow the instructions of any armed robbers, thus increasing the chances of a fatal incident. Nevin also asserted that Tom's instructions in the event of a robbery were to immediately open the tills and hand over everything without resisting.

=== Closing Statements ===
Prosecution lawyer Tom O'Connell S.C. asserted to the jury that Catherine Nevin was wide awake and walking freely around her home while her husband was being murdered during a staged robbery. O'Connell highlighted "inherent absurdities" in Nevin's version of events, such as how the assailant, who presumably had never been upstairs in the premises before, had managed to ransack Nevin's bedroom in the dark without knocking anything over, and thereafter scattered her jewellery everywhere without actually stealing anything. Several hours were unaccounted for according to Nevin's timeline also, seeing as Tom's time of death was estimated to be 02:00 and Nevin did not trigger the alarm until 04:30, most likely to allow the killer to get back to Dublin undetected. The trial had also heard testimony from three independent witnesses who all described a similar plot to have Tom Nevin killed in a staged robbery while in possession of a large amount of cash, a plot that was devised in secret by Catherine Nevin. The crime scene itself had no evidence of a struggle or attempt to subdue Tom, whose own policy was to immediately hand over the cash in the event of a robbery, while the use of specialist buckshot cartridges pointed to a premeditated assassination by a professional killer rather than a negligent discharge from a panicking robber. O'Connell continued that sheer hatred and pure greed were the primary motive's for Tom Nevin's murder, highlighting how his wife stood to inherit his entire estate after his death.

Defence lawyer Patrick MacEntee S.C. dismissed the case against Nevin as being based on weak circumstantial evidence, while also attacking the credibility of the three men who testified that she had attempted to solicit them to have her husband murdered several years before he was killed. MacEntee urged the jury to assess the trustworthiness of Gerry Heapes, John Jones and William McClean, and that they should give Nevin the benefit of the doubt if they were not satisfied with their evidence to the court.

In her summing up, Justice Mella Carroll clarified to the jury that they did not have to believe in entirety the testimony of witnesses who claimed they were solicited by Nevin to kill her husband, adding that they could "pick and choose" whatever portions they felt were relevant to the charge of solicitation to murder. Carroll also warned the jury that if they did find Nevin guilty of soliciting charges, this could not be used to then affect their decision on the murder charge, and all charges should be considered in isolation. However, if they found Nevin not guilty of the soliciting charges then they must also return a not guilty verdict on the murder charge, as the prosecution's case was based on circumstantial evidence and needed the extra evidence of soliciting to prove beyond reasonable doubt that Nevin ordered her husband to be murdered.

=== Verdict and sentencing ===
On 11 April 2000, after five days of jury deliberations, Catherine Nevin was unanimously found guilty of the murder of her husband Tom Nevin and sentenced to the mandatory penalty of life in prison. Nevin remained expressionless as the sentence was handed down. The jury also unanimously found Nevin guilty of soliciting Gerry Heapes to murder her husband, while returning majority guilty verdicts regarding the solicitation of John Jones and William McClean to commit murder. Nevin was later sentenced to an additional 7 years on each count, to be served concurrently alongside her life sentence for murder.

== Murder prime suspect ==
Although he was never charged in relation to the murder of Tom Nevin, notorious career criminal Patrick "Dutchy" Holland was later designated by Gardaí as being the prime suspect who carried out the contract killing on behalf of Catherine Nevin, as he had been working as a freelance hitman in the greater Dublin area since his release from prison in 1994. Additionally, after Holland's photo was widely circulated in the media due to his alleged involvement in the murder of Veronica Guerin, witnesses came forward identifying him as a regular customer at Jack White's Inn during the mid-1990s. Further investigations discovered that other patrons, who were aware of Holland's reputation, discretely pointed him out to Catherine Nevin as someone to be cautious of, as he was a violent criminal with previous convictions for firearms offences. In a 2008 interview with Hot Press magazine, Holland denied involvement in the death of Tom Nevin, asserting that Gardaí had associated him to the murder simply because he was living in nearby Brittas Bay at the time. Although Holland admitted being an infrequent visitor to Jack White's Inn and knowing Catherine Nevin to see, he claimed to have never spoke to her or had any interactions.

Some Gardaí however were reportedly sceptical of Holland's involvement, feeling that a professional hitman such as him would not have accepted the relatively low sum of £40,000 that Nevin was thought to be offering. The Garda case file submitted to the Director of Public Prosecutions theorised that, rather than hiring an assassin, Catherine Nevin may have committed the murder herself. The file noted that Tom Nevin still had a pen in his hand and his glasses on his nose when he was killed, suggesting that he was not surprised by the killer's arrival in the kitchen. Nevin also admitted that she had washed her hands before they were swabbed for gunshot residue. If this was the case, Nevin would still have required an accomplice to tie her up, remove the money to create the appearance of a robbery, and take the gun and the car away from the scene.

== Prison life ==
Nevin served her sentence at the Dóchas Centre, Dublin. She lost an appeal in 2003, and in 2010 lost an application to have her conviction declared a miscarriage of justice.

In 2016 Nevin was diagnosed with a brain tumour and given only months to live by doctors at the Mater Hospital. She was released on compassionate grounds in late 2017 and died on 19 February 2018, aged 67.
