= Murder of Shane Geoghegan =

Murdered rugby player

Shane Geoghegan, a rugby player for Garryowen, was an innocent victim of a feud between criminal gangs in Limerick, Ireland.

Shane Geoghegan (8 March 1980 – 9 November 2008) was an Irish rugby player for Garryowen who was shot and killed in a case of mistaken identity as part of a gang feud in Dooradoyle, a suburb in the city of Limerick, Ireland. The murder took place in the early hours of Sunday morning, 9 November 2008. He had no links with organised crime gangs.

== Background to the crime ==
=== The victim ===
Shane Geoghegan was a 28-year-old native of Limerick City. He worked for Air Atlanta as an aircraft fitter and was a keen rugby fan, playing as prop with Garryowen and was captain of their third team and lived with his girlfriend Jenna Barry. He was described as "A nice, decent guy who was well respected by young and old alike" by the secretary of his rugby club. It is believed that he bore a resemblance to a drug dealer called John McNamara, who was the target of a contract killing and lived nearby.

=== Limerick criminal gang feud ===
The murder was linked to the ongoing Limerick feud between rival criminal gangs and their battle to control drug supplies in Limerick. At least 13 people had been murdered in a turf war between the McCarthy-Dundon and Keane-Collopy gangs. There have also been cases of abductions and torture.

== The crime ==
Geoghegan watched the Ireland v Canada rugby international with friends on Saturday night. He then walked home through the Kilteragh housing estate in Dooradoyle at 1.30am. He was gunned down when up to 15 shots were fired at him. Geoghegan managed to run to the rear of a house in Clonmore, where he was shot three times in the upper body and once in the head. Members of the recently established Garda Regional Support Unit were the first at the scene after a 999 call was made from concerned residents who heard the sound of gunshots. A burnt-out getaway vehicle was found nearby.

=== Aftermath ===
Around 2,000 people attended his funeral Mass, including rugby internationals Jerry Flannery and David Wallace, as well as former Ireland rugby team coach Eddie O'Sullivan and the head of the New Zealand Rugby Union. The Catholic Bishop of Limerick described the death as a senseless killing. A minute's silence was held before Ireland's match against New Zealand at Croke Park the following weekend and at the game between Munster and New Zealand at Thomond Park. Garryowen retired the number three jersey from all its teams for the remainder of the season. In the Dáil, Shane Geoghegan's death was described as "an obscenity that could not be tolerated in a civilised society". Minister for Justice, Equality and Law Reform Dermot Ahern called his killers "scum".

== Investigation and trial ==
Up to 200 Gardaí worked on the murder enquiry, with 50 officers dedicated to the case on a daily basis. Searches were carried out resulting in seizures of handguns, ammunition and drugs. One of the leaders of the McCarthy-Dundon crime family handed himself in to Gardaí in the week following the shooting out of fear of being murdered. During the investigation, some of the suspects were tracked via their Bebo pages. Social networking sites were identified as a problem in glorifying gun crime. In March 2009, Gardaí arrested 15 people in connection with the shooting.

Twenty-three-year-old Barry Doyle from Portland Row, Dublin but living in Limerick was subsequently charged with the murder. He was put on trial in the Central Criminal Court in February 2011. Doyle was believed to be working on behalf of the McCarthy-Dundon gang and allegedly shot Geoghegan in a case of mistaken identity, thinking he was a criminal linked to the Keane-Callopy gang.

The trial of Barry Doyle resulted in a hung jury after one of the longest deliberation in Irish legal history. Due to the fact that according to his defence counsel Martin O'Rourke SC, his confession was due to threats and inducements made while in custody. On 15 February 2012, following a re-trial, Barry Doyle was convicted of the murder of Shane Geoghegan, in which he pleaded not guilty. The jury of three women and eight men returned a unanimous guilty verdict, after deliberating for six hours.

Justice Garrett Sheehan imposed a life sentence on Doyle, then a 26-year-old father-of-three. "There is only one sentence this court can impose and that's life in prison,” he said. He thanked the jury for their dedicated service and the "careful attention" they gave the case, and excluded them from jury duty for five years.

Gardaí continue to pursue their investigations into this case and in particular targeting more senior figures behind the killing.

On 18 August 2012, John Dundon from Limerick City, was also charged with the murder at the Special Criminal Court. He was found guilty on 13 August 2013 and sentenced to life in prison.

== Political fallout ==
Then Justice Minister Dermot Ahern made a statement to Dáil Éireann following the killing. National public opinion demanded strong action from the Government. Local TD and Minister for Defence Willie O'Dea, came under pressure to secure changes to the law and greater resources to tackle Limerick city's gangland crime. As a result, the Justice Minister introduced the Criminal Justice Bill 2009.

This introduced measures designed to tackle gangland crime:

- Organised crime offences will be tried in the Special Criminal Court.
- Directing or controlling a criminal organisation will carry a sentence of life imprisonment.
- Involvement in organised crime will carry a penalty of up to 15 years imprisonment.
- Garda opinion evidence as to the existence of criminal gangs will be admissible in evidence.
- The penalty for intimidation of a witness or juror will be increased from 10 years to 15 years.
- Gardaí will be able to detain organised crime suspects for questioning for up to 7 days.

There have been concerns that these laws are an infringement upon citizen's rights.

== Shane Geoghegan Trust ==
A charity was launched in honour of Shane Geoghegan in October 2009 by his mother and former Ireland soccer international and CEO of Sunderland AFC Niall Quinn. Its aims are to provide children with an alternative to criminal or anti-social behaviour by making a range of sporting and creative activities accessible to them. The trust is based on the Sunderland AFC foundation which helps children in vulnerable communities by getting them involved in sport.

== Other events ==
Limerick County Council hosted a civic reception for Shane Geoghegan on 12 July 2010. A memorial plaque was unveiled in the county council building's foyer. The next day a major charity match was held at Thomond Park – Sunderland A.F.C. versus Munster XI, with funds going to the Shane Geoghegan Trust.

There was an artistic tribute to Geoghegan in November 2011.
