= Malike Awo Woanyah Dey =

Ghanaian High Court Judge and Vice President of IAWJ Ghana Chapter

High Court Judge

High Court Judge
- Incumbent
- Assumed office December 2019
- Appointed by: Nana Addo Dankwa Akufo-Addo

Vice President, International Association of Women Judges (IAWJ) Ghana Chapter
- Incumbent
- Assumed office 2022

Assistant Secretary, IAWJ Ghana Chapter
- In office 2018–2022

Personal details
- Born: Ghana
- Spouse: Married
- Children: 2
- Education: University of Ghana (LLB, 2002); Ghana School of Law (QCL, 2004)
- Alma mater: University of Ghana; Ghana School of Law
- Occupation: Judge
- Known for: Vice President, IAWJ Ghana Chapter

Her Ladyship Justice Malike Awo Woanyah Dey is a Ghanaian High Court Judge and the current Vice President of the International Association of Women Judges (IAWJ), Ghana's Chapter.

== Education ==
Malike Awo Dey graduated from the University of Ghana, Faculty of Law in 2002 with an LLB and gained her Qualifying Certificate in Law from the Ghana School of Law in 2004, which qualified her to be admitted to the Ghanaian Bar.

== Career ==
=== Attorney-General's Department ===
Justice Malike Dey served as an Assistant State Attorney at the Attorney General's Department for ten (10) years. During her tenure at the department, she rose through the ranks to become a Senior State Attorney before following her call to the bench.

=== Circuit Court Bench ===
Justice Malike Dey was appointed to the bench in 2016 at the Circuit Court Level, which marked the beginning of her judicial career.

=== High Court Appointment ===
Justice Malike Dey, in December 2019, was among the thirty-four (34) judges who were elevated to the High Court and sworn in by the now Formal President Nana Addo Dankwa Akufo-Addo at the Banquet Hall of the Jubilee House.

== Personal life ==
Justice Malike Dey is a married woman with two children.
