= Tony Felloni =

Irish career criminal (1943–2024)

- Felloni c. 1990s
- Born: Anthony Carroll; 6 January 1943; Dublin, Ireland
- Died: 22 April 2024 (aged 81); Dublin, Ireland
- Other name: King Scum
- Spouse: Anne Marie Flynn (divorced)
- Children: 7
- Status: Released in 2011
- Criminal charges: Conspiracy to import heroin
- Penalty: 20 years' imprisonment

Felloni Gang
- Years active: 1980s–1996
- Territory: Ireland
- Ethnicity: Irish, Italians
- Membership: ca. 10 members and associates
- Activities: drug trafficking, pimping

Anthony Felloni (born Anthony Carroll, 6 January 1943 – 22 April 2024) was an Irish heroin dealer, pimp, and career criminal. Dubbed "King Scum" by media sources, Felloni became a hated figure in the 1980s and 1990s, blamed for introducing large quantities of heroin to Dublin and creating the city's first generation of heroin addicts. Originally a blackmailer and a pimp, Felloni later turned to burglary and robbery, before entering the drugs trade in Dublin city. His involvement ended after he was sentenced to twenty years in prison in 1996.

== Early life ==
Felloni was born in Dublin on 6 January 1943 to Ronaldo Felloni, a Sicilian immigrant, and Anne Carroll. As his parents were not married, he was given his mother's surname, giving him the name Anthony Carroll. He adopted his father's surname in 1969.

In a 1998 book on Felloni, Paul Reynolds commented that Felloni came from a "good home", unlike many of his criminal contemporaries at the time. His father worked as a tiler, and the family grew up on Dominick Street in Dublin's inner city.

== Criminal career ==
Felloni had been involved in petty crime since childhood, and was sent to St Conleth's Reformatory School as a youth, where he met future heroin kingpin Larry Dunne.

Felloni began as a blackmailer; he would seduce impressionable women from rural areas who were employed as domestic house workers and force them to pose for nude photographs, threatening to send the pictures to their parents unless they paid him half of their wages each week. He later began to force women into prostitution; in 1964 he was convicted of "procuring young girls for immoral purposes". During the 1960s he pretended to be the brother of footballer George Best to rent a flat in Rathgar, in which he stored stolen goods. He later turned to burglary and robbery; in 1967, while on remand for stealing a car, Felloni escaped from Bridewell Prison in Dublin by pretending to be a solicitor, but was recaptured the next day. The next month, he was sentenced to three months in prison for the theft of the car.

In 1980 Felloni moved to England and began to work in the growing drugs trade; he was arrested in Surrey in 1981 and jailed for four years for conspiracy to import heroin. Following his release, he returned to Dublin and became one of the city's largest heroin suppliers. Having worked alongside Larry Dunne in introducing the drug to the city, Felloni took over from Dunne after Dunne was sentenced to jail. Felloni was blamed for, in the words of Sunday Tribune, "flooding the Dublin drug markets with heroin", and was held responsible for creating the first generation of heroin addicts there. His children worked as couriers and tasters, and many of them were later imprisoned. Ali Bracken claimed in the Sunday Tribune that "he enlisted his children to help him sell heroin when they were just teenagers and encouraged them to experiment with the drug so that he could control them."

Felloni was imprisoned in 1986 for heroin dealing, receiving a ten-year sentence, and was paroled in 1993. Following his arrest, Felloni reportedly told Gardaí "When I come back, I'll flood Dublin with heroin." He was arrested four times between August 1994 and October 1995 for heroin possession, but was granted bail each time, allowing him to continue his dealing. This repeated granting of bail to Felloni became a point of political debate during the 1996 referendum on the Sixteenth Amendment of the Constitution of Ireland.

Following a Garda operation (codenamed "Operation Pizza") into his drug business, Felloni was arrested and charged with multiple drug offences. In June 1996, he was sentenced to twenty years' imprisonment for heroin trafficking, which at the time was the longest prison sentence handed down for drug offences in the state's history. Sentencing Felloni, Judge Cyril Kelly described him as "one of the principal movers of drugs in this city". Assets of over IR£400,000 were seized in 1998; it was estimated that Felloni and his family had earned £875,000 from drug dealing since 1988. An appeal against the sentence was denied in 1999.

In 1998, Paul Reynolds published King Scum: The Life and Crimes of Tony Felloni, a book about Felloni and his criminal career. In 1999, Felloni was reported in the Evening Herald to have tested HIV-positive.

In 2010, Gardaí seized another €500,000 from the family. Felloni was released in January 2011 after serving 14 1/2 years; at 67 years old and suffering from AIDS, he was not expected to return to crime. Following his release from prison, Dublin City Council member Cieran Perry tabled an unsuccessful motion calling on the council not to assist Felloni "in any way" in getting a council house, with Cllr. Perry describing him as "actually scum of the earth" who "has done so much damage in the area".

== Personal life and death ==
Felloni's ex-wife Anne Marie Flynn was the sister of Dublin politician Mannix Flynn. Felloni and Flynn met in a café on O'Connell Street; both already had a number of convictions by the age of eighteen and were in jail six weeks after their wedding. He had six children with her, including a son who died at three days old, and a son with a mistress, whom he also physically abused. Most of his children were part of the Felloni crime network, with all bar his youngest child developing heroin addictions and several developing HIV. In spite of the money he was making from the drug trade, Felloni would give none to his wife, forcing her to steal to feed the family.

Felloni was also physically abusive to Anne Marie, being three times convicted of assaulting her. In a 1977 court case, Flynn stated that Felloni had put her children in an institution. She told journalist Veronica Guerin that she had over 300 stitches on her body and that Felloni at one time attacked her with an axe. Anne Marie later divorced Felloni. She died in May 2024, aged 74.

Tony Felloni died from a heart attack at his home in Dublin, on 22 April 2024, at the age of 81.
