= Jack White's Inn =

Coordinates: 52.8820°N 6.0987°W

- Interactive map of Jack White's Inn

Restaurant information
- Location: Ballinapark, Brittas Bay, County Wicklow, A67 HE06, Ireland

Jack White's Inn is a pub and restaurant in Brittas Bay, County Wicklow in Ireland. It is located on N11 road, in an area where the Irish smuggler and pirate Jack White operated in the late 18th century.

== History ==
=== Jack White’s hole ===
The pub's name is a reference to Jack White, an Irish pirate that lived at the turn of the 18th century, reputed to be a smuggler. Jack White arranged shipment of Wicklow wool to be sent abroad to France in exchange for brandy, wine and French luxury goods. He operated in a place in Brittas Bay, known as 'Jack's Hole', where Jack White's Inn is now located. After a falling-out occurred over a particularly rich cargo of clandestine goods, Jack White was tried by some of his regular customers and sentenced to death. There is a reputed copy of an arrest warrant on the wall of Jack White's Inn.

=== Tom Nevin’s murder ===
In 1996, Jack White's Inn was the scene of one of the most famous Irish murders. On 16 March of that year, Tom Nevin, co-owner of the pub, was shot dead while counting the takings of the Bank Holiday Weekend. In a supposed botched robbery attempt, he was killed by a single shotgun blast. Catherine Nevin, Tom Nevin's wife and also owner of the pub, was suspected of having hired three men to murder her husband. She was tried by a jury of six men and six women, and found guilty on 11 April 2000 after five days of deliberation, "a record in Irish legal history". She was convicted for the murder and for soliciting three men (William McClean, Gerry Heapes and John Jones) to contract kill her husband. She maintained her innocence and had appealed on several occasions, without succeeding.

=== Revival ===
The restaurant and pub remained closed for some time after the murder of Tom Nevin. In January 1998, Catherine Nevin sold the pub.
