= McCarthy-Dundon =

Irish criminal gang

McCarthy-Dundon Gang
- Founded: 2000s
- Founded by: James McCarthy, Dessie Dundon
- Founding location: Limerick City, Ireland.
- Years active: 2000s-present
- Territory: Limerick City,
- Criminal activities: drug dealing, extortion and armed robbery
- Allies: Hutch Organised Crime Gang, Ryan Gang
- Rivals: Keane-Collopy Gang

The McCarthy-Dundon's is a criminal gang based in Limerick City, Ireland. Their main base is Hyde Road, Prospect on Limerick's southside but they also have a strong presence in Southill and in the northside suburb of Moyross. The gang, involved in drug dealing, extortion and armed robbery, have been central players in the Limerick feud, which has claimed up to 13 lives. The feud, which involves several criminal families, mainly the McCarthy-Dundons, the Ryans and the Keane-Collopy and the Crawford gang from St. Mary's Park, has been ongoing since 2000.

The gang have also been responsible for the high-profile murders of several innocent people unconnected to gangland, including night club bouncer Brian Fitzgerald, shot dead in 2002, the murder of Shane Geoghegan, shot in a case of mistaken identity in 2008 and businessman Roy Collins, who was murdered in 2009.Gardaí suspect the gang helped organise the murder of Baiba Saulite in 2006. The mother-of-two was shot dead outside her home in Swords, County Dublin by a lone gunman. It is suspected the murder was ordered by her ex-husband, Lebanese gangster Hassan Hassan. While in prison he approached gang members to help organise the murder.

Two gang members were convicted in 2008 of conspiring to possess weapons after a joint operation between Gardaí and undercover agents from the Serious Organised Crime Agency in the UK. Glen Geasley (27), and Sean Callinan (21) were jailed after a plot to import weapons to be used against the gang's rivals. The weapons included rocket launchers, AKM assault rifles and uzi submachine guns.

The Criminal Assets Bureau seized two bullet-proof BMW's from gang members in 2009. The cars, worth €150,000 and registered to brothers and senior gang members, Wayne and Gerard Dundon, were imported from Germany where they had been modified with bullet-proof glass and reinforced armoured doors.

By the start of the 2010s, the leaders of the McCarthy-Dundon gang, Wayne, John and Dessie Dundon, have been sentenced to life imprisonment for different murders, resulting from gang members and relatives of the brothers becoming supergrasses like Thomas O'Neill. Their brother Gerard Dundon was jailed for four years in 2018 after he was found guilty of possessing a restricted firearm without a license. A bench warrant for the arrest of their sister Annabel Dundon was issued in 2011 after she was accused of threatening to kill another woman. However, the charges against her were eventually withdrawn by the DPP in 2017 because she had been living outside of the jurisdiction of Ireland for a number of years. The gang has had no real power on the streets of Limerick City since 2010.
