= John Gilligan (criminal) =

Irish drug trafficker and mob boss

- Born: 29 March 1952 (age 74); Dublin, Ireland
- Other name: "Factory John"
- Known for: murder of Veronica Guerin
- Opponent: Martin "The Viper" Foley
- Conviction: Drug trafficking
- Penalty: 20 years imprisonment

John Gilligan (born 28 March 1952) is a convicted Irish gangster. Dubbed "Factory John" by the media due to his involvement in warehouse heists, he was given a 28-year prison sentence for the trafficking of commercial quantities of cannabis resin. On appeal, this sentence was reduced to 20 years, and in October 2013, he was released after serving 17 years.

== Background ==
Originally an associate of Martin Cahill, Gilligan was part of a gang of professional criminals who in the late 1980s robbed warehouses around the M50 orbital motorway in Dublin of valuable goods, for which he received a 4-year prison sentence in 1990. On his release from Portlaoise Prison in November 1993, Gilligan began earning up to £80,000 a month from smuggling tobacco, and soon made contact with major drug traffickers such as Ecstasy dealer Peter Mitchell, who ran his illegal business from the Hogan Stand public house on the North Circular Road, Dublin.

Gilligan soon had a gang of henchmen to assist in running his own drug trafficking network, whose main "lieutenants" included:

- Brian Meehan - Gilligan's right-hand man and an enforcer who was suspected of carrying out a number of failed assassinations, allegedly including two attempts on Martin "The Viper" Foley
- John Dunne - corrupt shipping executive who arranged the clearance of drug shipments through customs and then transported it to a rendezvous with other gang members outside Naas
- Paul Ward - distributed drugs and thereafter collected money from reseller's sales
- Charles Bowden - former Irish army N.C.O. and a karate black belt, was primarily responsible for wholesale drug distribution and maintaining the gang's arsenal of automatic weapons
- Russell Warren - collected cash from other gang members and then smuggled it to mainland Europe for purposes of money laundering
- Patrick "Dutchy" Holland - master forger and prolific armed robber, who was also suspected by Gardaí to have been responsible for a number of contract killings, distributed drugs for the gang
- John "the Coach" Traynor - con man who was also a confidential source for Irish investigative journalist Veronica Guerin

After sourcing a major supplier of cannabis resin from mainland Europe, Gilligan subsequently arranged for criminal associates in The Netherlands to have boxes labeled "spare parts" sent in containers to the Port of Cork, where the shipments would then be transported to the Ambassador Hotel on the outskirts of Naas by John Dunne for handover to Charles Bowden. Bowden thereafter brought the consignments to a unit the gang rented at the Greenmount Industrial Estate in Harold's Cross, then sold the hashish onto distributors around Dublin for an average of £2,200 per kilogram. Irish authorities later calculated that Gilligan had imported over 20,000 kilograms of cannabis resin via the Port of Cork between July 1994 and October 1996, with an estimated street value of £180 million. In a 2023 interview, John Gilligan claimed that he personally made over £10 million in profits from importing and distributing cannabis resin in the mid-1990s.

== Murder of Veronica Guerin ==
Journalist Veronica Guerin was well known in Ireland for investigating organized crime, and had been attacked on several occasions in relation to her articles. On the night of 7 October 1994, shots were fired into Guerin's house in Cloghran while she was at home with her family, however no one was injured. On the evening of 30 January 1995, Guerin answered the door of her house to be confronted by a man wearing a motorbike helmet, who pointed a semi-automatic pistol in her face and then lowered it to fire a shot into her right upper leg before fleeing the scene. Ballistic checks later established that the same gun was used in both shootings.

On 14 September 1995, John Gilligan was doorstepped by Veronica Guerin at his Jessbrook Equestrian Centre in Enfield, County Meath to ask him about his source of income. Gilligan physically assaulted Guerin and chased her off the property, and the next day rang her mobile phone to threaten her with being shot if she wrote any articles about him. Gilligan's threats were overheard by her barrister, Felix McElroy, who went with Guerin to make an official statement to Gardaí, from the result of which Gilligan was charged with assault. Gilligan's assault case caused huge concern within his drugs gang, as he was the only one that had business dealings with the European sources of the hashish and if he went to prison they feared that their entire drug importation system would collapse. Brian Meehan was later quoted by Charles Bowden in saying that Gilligan had said "he was going to have something done about her". On the evening of 25 June 1996, gang members Charles Bowden, Brian Meehan and Peter Mitchell met at the Greenmount Industrial Estate, where Bowden serviced and then loaded a Colt Python revolver with .357 Magnum semiwadcutter bullets. On the same day, John Gilligan departed from Dublin and flew to Amsterdam via commercial airline.

On the morning of 26 June 1996, Guerin appeared at Naas District Court on a speeding charge. At around 12:30pm, she left the courthouse to drive her red Opel Calibra back to Dublin. During this time, Guerin was under covert surveillance by gang member Russell Warren, who was in constant phone contact with both John Gilligan and Brian Meehan giving updates to her location. Warren would later recall that when speaking to Meehan, who had a hands free phone, he could hear the sound of a motorbike engine at all times. At around 12:55pm, Guerin stopped at a red traffic light on the Naas Dual Carriageway near Newlands Cross. A Kawasaki motorbike with two passengers suddenly stopped beside her car, then the pillion passenger smashed her driver side window with the butt of a handgun before opening fire six times, killing Guerin almost instantly. In July 1996, assault charges were officially struck out against Gilligan due to the death of the only witness in the case, Veronica Guerin.

In November 1998, Paul Ward was sentenced to life imprisonment for the murder of Veronica Guerin, after being found guilty of disposing of the motorbike and handgun used in her murder. In July 1999, Brian Meehan was sentenced to life imprisonment for the murder of Veronica Guerin, after being found guilty of driving the motorbike that carried the hitman who shot her. Former gang members Charles Bowden and Russell Warren turned supergrass and testified against both men after the Irish government offered complete immunity from prosecution in relation to Guerin's murder in return for them turning state's witness. Although he never faced charges in relation to her death, the Gardaí prime suspect for the person who fired the fatal shots was Patrick "Dutchy" Holland, who was also named by Charles Bowden as the person who killed Guerin.

== Acquittal for the murder of Veronica Guerin ==
Despite former gang members testifying that he was the mastermind behind her death, in 2002 Gilligan was tried and acquitted of the murder of the investigative journalist Veronica Guerin, who was investigating Gilligan's involvement in the illegal hashish trade in Ireland at the time of her death. Gilligan was however found guilty of drug trafficking and sentenced to 28 years in prison by the Special Criminal Court. In a 2023 interview, Gilligan claimed Brian Meehan had confessed to him that John "the Coach" Traynor ordered Guerin's murder as she was about to write an article accusing Traynor of dealing heroin, and that Charles Bowden carried out the actual shooting while Meehan himself drove the getaway motorbike.

After her murder, the Gardaí had more than 100 officers working on the case at one point, leading to 214 arrests, 39 convictions, and 100 confiscations of guns, £5,000,000 worth of drugs and £6,500,000 worth of property. Gilligan's assets remained frozen by the Criminal Assets Bureau (CAB). On 30 January 2006, the High Court cleared the way for the CAB to proceed with an application to have the equestrian centre and other property that belonged to the Gilligan family handed over to the state. In January 2008, making a court appearance in an attempt to stop the state from selling off his assets, Gilligan accused John Traynor of having ordered the murder of Veronica Guerin.

After accusing the presiding judge of an attempt to silence him, Gilligan continued to blame a botched Gardaí investigation and alleged that the Gardaí had planted evidence to secure his conviction, leading to his current term of imprisonment. On 19 December 2008, Gilligan lost an appeal for a second hearing by the High Court. Because of the decision, the CAB applied to the High Court under the Proceeds of Crime Act to dispose of Gilligan's properties.

In November 2012, the courts cleared the final barriers allowing the CAB to sell off the equestrian centre and Gilligan's house at Weston Green, Lucan. In July 2014, after a lengthy challenge, a Supreme Court ruling brought the CAB one step closer to selling off the house adjoining the equestrian centre, retained by Gilligan's wife, as well as additional properties in Blanchardstown and Lucan.

== Assassination attempt ==
On 1 March 2014 at 7.00pm, two gunmen came to the home of Gilligan's brother in Clondalkin. They entered the house while Gilligan was using the toilet. Paramedics from the Dublin Fire Brigade and Advanced Paramedics from the National Ambulance Service arrived at the scene five minutes later to at least four confirmed gunshot wounds: in his face, chest, hip and leg. Gilligan was rushed to James Connolly Memorial Hospital, where he was in a critical state. He was given the last rites as he arrived at James Connolly Memorial Hospital, in Blanchardstown, but he survived the shooting. It was reported on 14 March that the ammunition that was used to shoot him matched ammunition that had been stolen from German police a decade earlier.

His bodyguard, Stephen Douglas 'Dougie' Moran, was shot dead on 15 March 2014 in Lucan.

After the shooting of Moran, Gilligan was discharged from hospital and then left the country.

== Civil forfeiture ==
As part of attempts to repress organised crime, including Gilligan's drug trafficking activities, Ireland introduced new civil forfeiture legislation in the wake of the murder of Guerin, the Proceeds of Crime Act, 1996. Gilligan repeatedly challenged its constitutionality in the Supreme Court of Ireland and elsewhere.

== 2018 arrest for money laundering ==
On 23 August 2018, Gilligan was arrested as he tried to board a flight from Belfast International Airport to Spain with more than €22,000 in a suitcase. He was formally charged with attempting to remove criminal property from Northern Ireland by Antrim Magistrates' Court the following day. Following the hearing he was remanded in custody after his lawyer's application for bail was refused.

== 2020 arrest for drug trafficking ==
On 23 October 2020, Gilligan and two other men, one believed to be his son, were arrested in Spain. Spanish police seized quantities of drugs and weapons. He was released on bail in December 2020.
