= Limerick feud =

Criminal gang conflict in Ireland

Date	2000 - 2015
Location	Limerick

Belligerents
Keane-Collopy gang Ryan gang	McCarthy-Dundon gang

Casualties and losses
- 19

The Limerick feud was a feud between rival criminal gangs in Limerick City, Ireland. The feud started between two criminals in the year 2000 and then spread to involve several criminal families, mainly the Keane-Collopy gang from St. Mary's Park and the McCarthy-Dundon gang from Ballinacurra Weston. While control of the drug trade is a factor in the feud, according to Garda Superintendent Gerry Mahon, the primary driving force is "absolute hatred by each side for the other". Up to twenty murders and hundreds of shootings, stabbings, and pipe bomb attacks have been attributed to the feud since it ended in 2015.

== Background ==
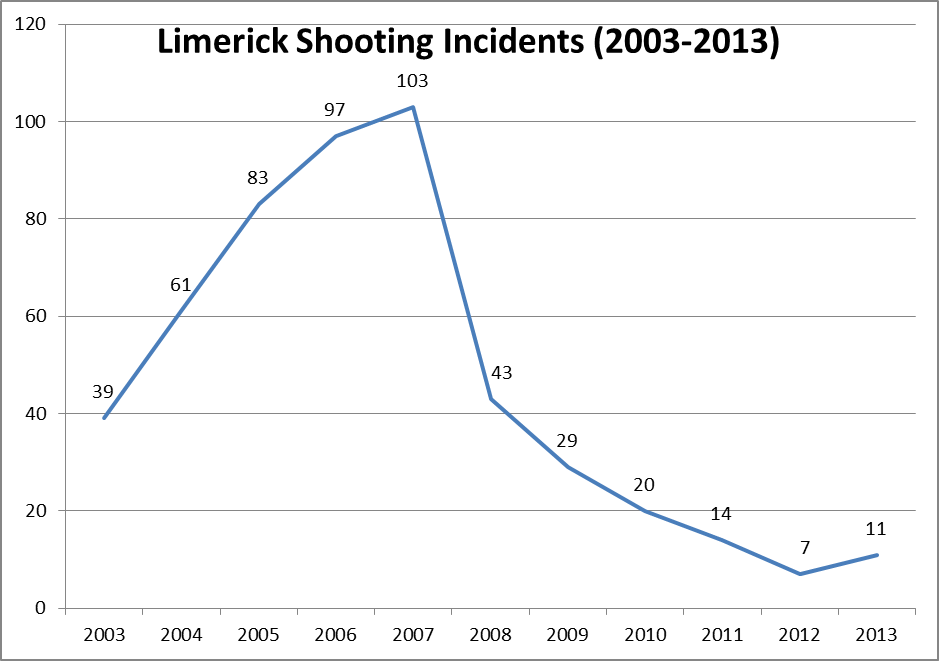
A line graph showing the rise and fall of gun crime in Limerick between 2003 & 2013.

Throughout the latter part of the twentieth century, Limerick grappled with a crime problem, with numerous high-profile crime incidents occurring in city. In this period the city gained notoriety being dubbed "Stab City" by media outlets, while nationally the city gained a popular image and reputation for criminality, violent disorder, and toughness. While there are a number of various and complex reasons for feuding and crime in the city, part of the problems arise from the deprivation experienced in some of the suburban local authority housing estates built by Limerick Corporation from the mid-to late 20th century. By end of the 20th century, endemic unemployment and deprivation in these estates were amongst the highest in Ireland, fostering major antisocial behaviour in the estates as well as high levels of organized crime amongst rival gangs within the city in order to control the city's drug trade.

While feuding in parts of the city goes back decades, the present feud can be traced back to a dispute between gang boss Christy Keane and close associate, Eddie Ryan. In 2000. Keane, a major drug dealer and leader of the Keane-Collopy gang, and Ryan, the gang's main enforcer, had a bitter falling-out after a series of violent incidents involving relatives of the men. On the afternoon of Friday, 10 November 2000, an attempt was made on the life of Christy Keane as he was collecting his son from school at Edmund Rice College on Shelbourne Road. A gunman, believed to be Eddie Ryan, approached him as he sat in his car and he tried to shoot Keane, but the gun jammed and Keane escaped with his life. Two nights later as forty-year-old Ryan was drinking in the Moose Bar in Cathedral Place, two gunmen entered and shot him dead. Ryan's son Keiran, who almost certainly would have been killed as well, survived; as he had gone to the toilet seconds before the killers arrived at the bar. The gunmen were believed to be Keiran Keane, a brother of Christy, and Philip Collopy. As well as dozens of other serious incidents over the following year, there were at least 30 petrol bomb and gun attacks on the home of Eddie Ryan's brother, John.

== Double Cross ==
The McCarthy-Dundon gang, who were involved in drug dealing, robbery, and extortion, secretly agreed to join forces with the Ryan faction in an attempt to take control of the Limerick drug scene. They had been careful not to allow themselves to be seen to be allied with the Ryans and their associates. They deceived the Keane-Collopys in to believing they would remain neutral in the feud even though they had supplied them with guns previously.

On 23 January 2003, Eddie Ryan's sons, Eddie Jr. (aged 20) and Keiran (aged 19) were reported abducted after being bundled in to a van by several armed and masked men on Moylish Road, Ballynanty.

It is unclear if the McCarthy-Dundons set up the "kidnapping plot" after being contracted to do so by Keiran Keane. Keane had agreed to pay €60,000 in the return for the Ryan brothers' murder.

Seven days after the Ryans were allegedly abducted, Keiran Keane and his nephew Owen Treacy went to a house in the Garryowen area of the city to meet Dessie Dundon. They believed they were going to witness the execution of the Ryan brothers or view their dead bodies. On entering the house they were confronted by several armed men, had their hands tied and were beaten. After a failed attempt by the captors to also lure brothers Keiran and Phillip Collopy in to a 'trap', Keane and Treacy were eventually brought to a country lane in Drumbanna, five miles outside the city. Keiran Keane was stabbed in the face before being shot in the back of the head. Owen Treacy was stabbed seventeen times in the face, head and chest. The attackers left believing both men to be dead but Treacy survived and made his way to a nearby house for help.

Six hours later the Ryan brothers walked into a Gardaí station in Athlone. Subsequent Garda investigations revealed they had never been kidnapped and spent the week at the home of an associate in Thurles, County Tipperary.

Dessie Dundon (aged 20), David Stanners (aged 31), James McCarthy (aged 24), Christopher Costelloe (aged 20), and Anthony McCarthy (aged 21) were all given life sentences for the murder of Keiran Keane

== Post Double-Cross Killings ==
John Ryan, 47, was killed in Thomondgate in July 2003. John was not involved in the feud. Two men on a motorbike arrived as he stood outside a house and the pillion passenger shot him several times. Twenty-three-year-old Michael Campbell McNamara was a member of the Keane-Collopy gang and was centrally involved in the feud. On 21 October 2003, his mutilated body was found on waste ground near Southill, Limerick. His arms and legs were bound and he had been stabbed multiple times and shot twice. Other victims of the feud were the 2006 murders of Aidan Kelly (aged 19) shot dead near Ardnacrusha, "Fat" Frankie Ryan (aged 21), a senior McCarthy-Dundon member shot dead in Moyross, Noel Crawford (aged 40) shot dead in Southhill after being mistaken for his brother Paul, a known McCarthy-Dundon associate, and Noel Campion (aged 35), a convicted armed robber from a notorious family in Moyross, shot dead by the McCarthy-Dundons in Thomondgate.

There were over 100 shooting incidents in the city in 2007 linked to the feud as rival gang members attacked each other and each other's homes.

On 5 April 2008, Mark Moloney (aged 40), a friend of the Keane-Collopys, was shot dead at 3 pm as he spoke to a friend outside a shop in Garryowen. Two days later as Gardaí searched waste ground looking for the gun used in Moloney's murder, they found the body of James Cronin (aged 20) buried in a shallow grave near Ballinacurra Weston. He had been shot in the back of the head the day before. Gardaí suspect Cronin drove the getaway car in the Maloney murder and was killed by his fellow gang members because they feared he would talk to the Gardaí if arrested.

A killing that caused a public outrage in the city was the murder of Shane Geoghegan (aged 28), who was shot dead in a case of mistaken identity near his home in Dooradoyle in November 2008. Shane was an innocent victim with no connection to the feud. The intended target was Shane's neighbour, John McNamara, an ally of the Keane-Collopys who had survived three previous attempts on his life.

Daniel Treacy, a brother of Owen, was killed on 22 February 2010 at a filling station on the Ennis Road. Thirty-five-year-old Treacy, who was not involved in the feud, was shot three times in the head by a lone gunman.

== 2011 onwards ==
Heavily armed Garda detectives from the NBCI conduct an aggressive stop-and-search on a drug gang suspect in Limerick

Gardaí have been extremely successful at putting the feud to a stop, which has led to a dramatic reduction in the violence. Up to sixty key figures involved in the feud are in prison.

Dessie, John and Wayne Dundon are serving life sentences for murder. Their brother Gerard, was held in prison for violent disorder. Nathan Killeen, a senior McCarthy-Dundon member, is also serving a life sentence for murder and is awaiting trial for a second murder.

The McCarthy-Dundons are currently led by a cousin of the Dundon brothers, who returned to Limerick from England in 2011, where he had served half an eleven-year sentence for a firearms offence.

Keiran and Eddie Ryan Jr. were both convicted of firearms offences. Ryan Jr. was released in July 2014 after a High Court Judge ruled that he was entitled to one-third remission of his original six-year sentence. However, Ryan Jr's remission was revoked in August 2014 after a Dublin court ruled his release constitutionally invalid.

Many of the feud instigators in the Keane-Collopy gang are also serving long prison sentences. Christy Keane suffered an assassination attempt against him on 29 June 2015, as a result of being suspected by Gardaí of being still involved in the drug trade. He was shot multiple times by two gunmen on the University of Limerick campus as he made his way to use the university gym, but survived the attack. Young criminals aligned to the McCarthy-Dundon and Ryan gangs are the main suspects. Since 2015, there has been no major gun violence between the two gangs with the last shooting incident between them being Keane's in 2015.
