= Eusebia Munuo =

Tanzanian jurist

Eusebia Munuo is a Tanzanian jurist who was a Judge of the Court of Appeal of Tanzania and served as president of the International Association of Women Judges from 2012 to 2014.

== Career ==
Munuo was the first female Judge of a Court of Appeal in East Africa. She chaired the Supreme Court in the Land Division after it was established in the early 2000s. She chaired the state Parole Board until her term expired in 2016.

Munuo spoke about the number of rape cases that failed due to bribery of doctors by accused persons. She also noted the problem of economic violence for widows in rural communities. She also spoke out against the patriarchal system that denied capable women from being appointed as judges across Africa and against sexual corruption and "sextortion".

Munuo is named by Tanzania Zalendo as one of the country's 100 Great Tanzanians. She noted in 2014 that delays in the judicial systems impacted significantly on poor people, particularly women, whereas female representation in the judiciary had encouraged women to study law and join the legal profession. She received an award for her service from President Jakaya Kikwete.

In 2016, Munuo co-authored a book titled A Comparative Review of Presidential Election Court Decisions in East Africa with legal scholars Frederick Ssempebwa, Businge Kabumba, and Lillian Tibatemwa-Ekirikubinza, in which they suggest the Supreme Court of Uganda should have cancelled the re-election of President Yoweri Museveni after the 18 February polls breached electoral laws.
