= Mella Carroll =

Irish judge (1934–2006)

Judge of the High Court
- In office 6 October 1980 – 12 July 2005
- Nominated by: Government of Ireland
- Appointed by: Patrick Hillery

Personal details
- Born: Mella Elizabeth Laurie Carroll; 6 March 1934 Dublin, Ireland
- Died: 15 January 2006 (aged 71) Dublin, Ireland
- Resting place: Waterville, County Kerry, Ireland
- Education: University College Dublin; King's Inns

Mella Elizabeth Laurie Carroll, SC (6 March 1934 – 15 January 2006) was an Irish judge who served as a Judge of the High Court from 1980 to 2005.

She was the first woman to serve as a High Court judge in Ireland.

== Early life and education ==
Carroll was born in Dublin in 1934, her parents were Patrick Carroll (founder member and Commissioner of the Garda Síochána from May 1967 until his retirement in September 1968) and Agnes Mary Caulfield. Her siblings were Milo, Paddy, and Una.

Carroll attended Sacred Heart Convent School of lower Leeson Street and then University College Dublin, where she graduated in French and German.

She then studied at the King's Inns, where she came top in the examination for the high-profile Brooke scholarship. She was called to the Irish Bar in 1957, building a large practice and in 1976, was called to the Bar of Northern Ireland.

== Legal career ==
In 1977, she became a Senior Counsel in the Republic of Ireland. For a time, she was the only female Senior Counsel practising in the Irish state. In 1979, she was the first woman to be elected a bar bencher of King's Inns and chairman of the Bar Council.

== Judicial career ==
In October 1980, Carroll was nominated by the government of Taoiseach Charles Haughey to become a judge of the High Court. She was appointed by President Patrick Hillery on 6 October 1980, the first woman appointed to the superior courts of Ireland. She was addressed as 'my lord' by barristers in her court for 10 years until she announced she would prefer to be called 'judge'.

During her time on the bench in the High Court, she delivered several important decisions. For instance, the attempted ban on One Girl's War: Personal Exploits in MI5's Most Secret Station (the memoirs of Joan Miller) was declined by her after a request by the Attorney General for England and Wales. She also delivered judgements in controversial cases on abortion, bin charging and unmarried mothers. She sat in the Central Criminal Court over the Catherine Nevin murder trial and subsequent retrial because of the jury being overheard in its deliberation.

On 21 April 2004, Judge Carroll was awarded an honorary Doctorate of Law by University College Dublin.

She retired from the bench in November 2005 after 25 years, due to a long-running illness.

Carroll chaired several high-profile commissions in the Republic; the County and County Borough Electoral Area Boundaries Commission (1984) and the Commission on the Status of Women (1991) described as "a comprehensive statement of the demands of Irish women for equality". She also chaired the Commission on Nursing (1997), a "significant milestone in the history of nursing and midwifery in Ireland".

Carroll also held judicial positions in the administrative tribunal of the International Labour Organization, Geneva, for a time being the vice-president. She was elected president of the International Association of Women Judges, serving from 2000 to 2002. She was appointed Chancellor of Dublin City University (and Chair of the Governing Authority) in 2001 and held this post until her death.

Mella Carroll died on 15 January 2006 and is buried in Waterville, County Kerry.
