= International Association of Women Judges =

- Abbreviation: IAWJ
- Founded: 1991
- Headquarters: Washington, D.C., United States
- President: Mina Sougrati
- Vice-Presidents: Robyn Tupman; Maria Theresa V. Mendoza-Arcega
- Executive Director: Christie Jones
- Award: Bolch Prize for the Rule of Law 2022
- Website: www.iawj.org

The International Association of Women Judges (IAWJ) is a non-profit non governmental organization founded in 1991 whose members are judges from around the world committed to equal justice for women.

== History ==
The IAWJ was founded in 1991 after fifty women judges from around the world were invited to participate in the tenth anniversary meeting of the United States National Association of Women Judges. It was decided that gender discrimination in the judiciary would be easier to combat with the forming of an international alliance. In October 1991, women judges in 15 countries approved the inaugural constitution of the IAWJ. Its first meeting was held in October 1992, bringing together 82 judges from 42 different countries in San Diego. The issue that interested them most was family violence. Women judges sponsored workshops and conferences around the world to teach about the prevalence of domestic violence, how to prevent it, and how to enact laws to define it as a crime with penalties. The IAWJ also took on a project to educate judges on how to apply international human rights instruments to cases affecting women in local courts.

The IAWJ's first president was Arline Pacht. In May 1994, it held a conference in Rome on domestic violence. Arline Pacht is credited with providing the early support that was needed to launch this international organisation.

In 2010, when the UK's Baroness Hale was elected President of IAWJ, it had over 4,000 members from over 90 countries. By 2017, it had over 5,000 members. By 2019, it had over 6,000 members.

== Structure ==
The IAWJ is based in Washington DC and is a non-profit, non-governmental organisation. Its members represent all levels of the judiciary worldwide. It seeks to pioneer judicial education programs to advance human rights, uproot gender bias from judicial systems and promote women's access to courts. It has a ten-member Board of Directors and a seven-member Executive Council.

The IAWJ holds a biennial conference, where new board members are elected. The 2023 IAWJ general conference will be held Marrakesh, Morocco from May 11–15.

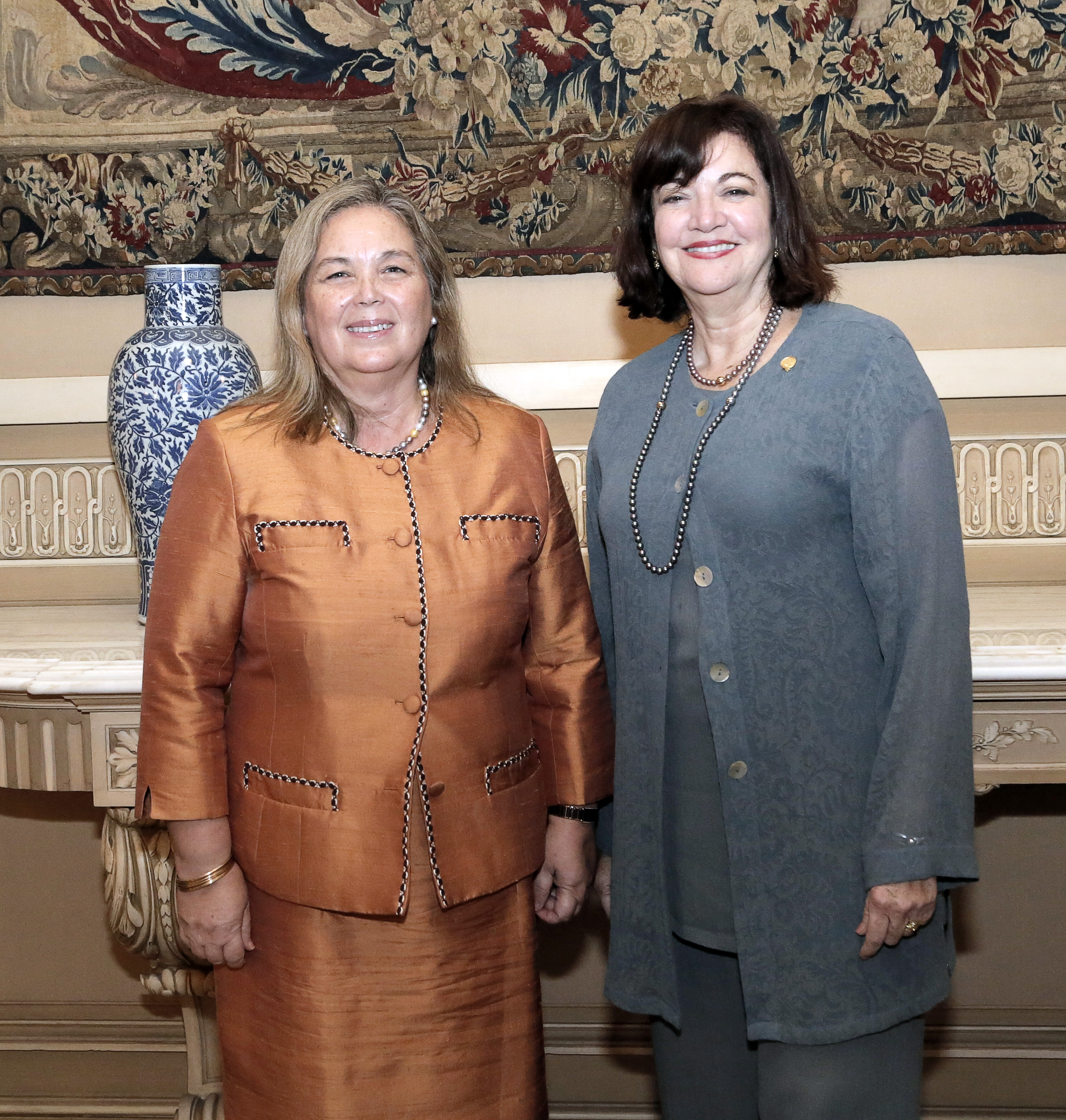
Susana Medina (left) transferring presidency of the International Association of Women Judges to Vanessa Ruiz (right), in Argentina in 2018

=== Presidents ===
- Arline Pacht, United States, 1992-1994
- Pacita Canizares-Nye, Philippines, 1994-1996
- Susan Devine, Canada, 1996-1998
- Carmen Argibay, Argentina, 1998-2000
- Mella Carroll, Ireland, 2000-2002
- Laeticia Kikonyogo, Uganda, 2002-2004
- Jane Mathews, Australia, 2004-2006
- Graciela Dixon, Panama, 2006-2008
- Leslie Alden, United States, 2008-2010
- Brenda Hale, United Kingdom, 2010-2012
- Eusebia Munuo, Tanzania, 2012-2014
- Teresita de Castro, Philippines, 2014-2016
- Susana Medina de Rizzo, Argentina, 2016-2018
- Vanessa Ruiz, United States, 2018-2020
- Susan Glazebrook, New Zealand, 2020 - 2022
- Binta Nyako, Nigeria, 2023–present
- Mina Sougrati, Morocco, President-elect

== Programs ==
The IAWJ works on six main themes: advancing women's leadership in law, ending gender based violence, strengthening judicial integrity, fighting sextortion, promoting inclusive justice, and combatting human trafficking.

The IAWJ is credited with creating the term "sextortion" in 2009 to describe the pervasive form of sexual exploitation that occurs when people in positions of authority seek to extort sexual favours in exchange of something within their power to grant or withhold. IAWJ also published a toolkit to "raise awareness about sextortion and provides the “tools” – guidance, information, and resources – with which to address a pervasive, but often hidden, form of corruption that degrades its victims and undermines social institutions around the world."

The IAWJ works with national associations in five regions to develop and implement training on issues concerning discrimination and violence against women, including its judicial training initiative, the Jurisprudence of Equality Program. Through its Towards a Jurisprudence of Equality Program (JEP), the International Association of Women Judges and its partner national women judges associations have enabled judges and magistrates in Africa and Latin America to implement effectively the Convention on the Elimination of All Forms of Discrimination Against Women (CEDAW).

In 2021, the IAWJ committed to rescuing and resettling endangered Afghan Women Judges. The IAWJ Afghan Women Judges Rescue Committee was awarded the PILnet Global Partnership Award. PILnet is a global non-governmental organization that provide opportunities for social change by collaborating with public interest and private lawyers to create high-quality, free legal assistance for civil society organizations. The PILnet Global Partnership Award "recognizes the best, most innovative pro bono legal project undertaken as a cross-sectoral collaboration with an impact felt in more than one country". The Bolch Judicial Institute has named the International Association of Women Judges (IAWJ) as the 2023 recipient of the Bolch Prize for the Rule of Law in recognition of the organization's efforts to evacuate, support, and resettle Afghan women judges who, because of their gender and work as judges, have faced persecution and violence since the Taliban took control of the country in late 2021.
