= Keane-Collopy =

Gang based in Limerick City, Ireland

Keane-Collopy Gang
- Founded: 1990s
- Founded by: Christy Keane
- Founding location: Limerick, Ireland
- Years active: 1990s-present
- Territory: Mid-West Region, Ireland
- Criminal activities: drug trafficking
- Allies: Hutch Organised Crime Gang
- Rivals: McCarthy-Dundon Gang, Ryan Gang

The Keane-Collopy gang is a criminal organisation based in Limerick City, Ireland. Its members are major suppliers of drugs in the Mid-West region and have been heavily involved in the Limerick feud since 2000, when an attempt was made on the life of gang leader Christy Keane, by Eddie Ryan. The feud, which mainly involves the Keane-Collopys, the Ryans and the McCarthy-Dundon gang, has resulted in hundreds of violent incidents including stabbings, shootings and bomb attacks and the deaths of up to twenty people.

Keane-Collopy members are estimated to own more than 30 properties in the Limerick suburb of St. Mary's Park, where the gang is based. They have strong links to gangs in Dublin and Cork.

The gang has been consistently targeted by the Criminal Assets Bureau, with several properties and vehicles bought with the proceeds of crime, seized by the state. The Keane-Collopys have been severely weakened in recent years, with many key figures dead or in jail serving long sentences for feud-related offences.

== Rivals ==
Currently, the Limerick feud shows that Keane-Collopy's enemy(es) are:

1. McCarthy-Dundon
