= Special Criminal Court =

Irish specialist court

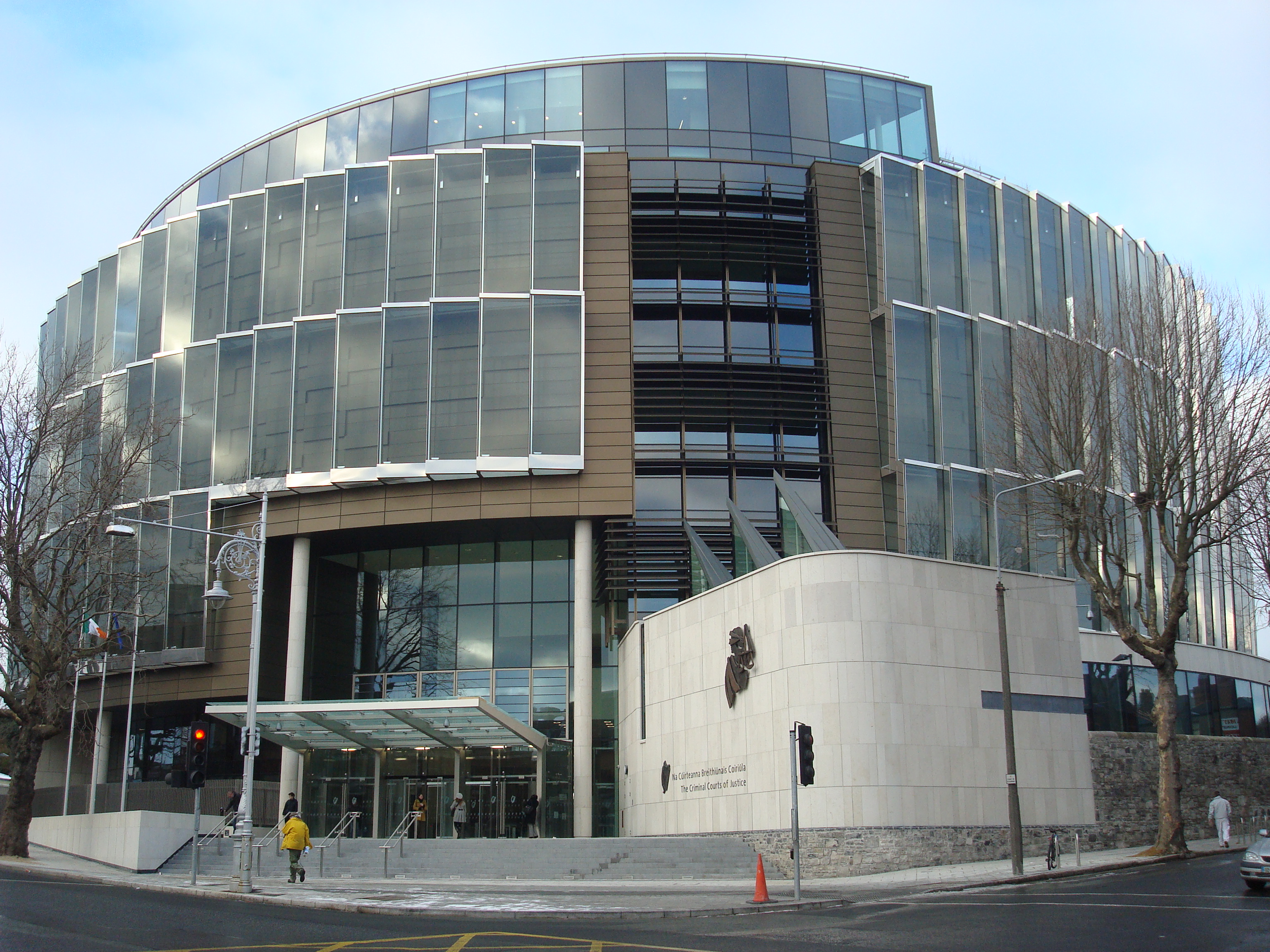
Special Criminal Court (SCC) sittings are usually held at the Criminal Courts of Justice complex in Dublin

The Special Criminal Court (SCC; Irish: An Chúirt Choiriúil Speisialta) is a juryless criminal court in Ireland which tries terrorism and serious organised crime cases. It is based in the Criminal Courts of Justice, Dublin.

== Legal basis ==
Article 38 of the Constitution of Ireland empowers the Dáil to establish "special courts" with wide-ranging powers when the "ordinary courts are inadequate to secure the effective administration of justice".

The Offences against the State Act 1939 led to the establishment of the Special Criminal Court for the trial of certain offences. The scope of a "scheduled offence" is set out in the Offences Against the State (Scheduled Offences) Order 1972 as encompassing offences under:

- Malicious Damage Act 1861
- Explosive Substances Act 1883
- Firearms Act 1925 to 1971
- Offences against the State Act 1939

A further class of offences was added by Statutory Instrument later the same year under:

- s.7 of the Conspiracy and Protection of Property Act 1875

Offenses under the Criminal Damage Act 1991 are also scheduled.

- Criminal Justice (Terrorist Offences) Act 2005

=== Scheduled offences ===
Offences covered under the laws are known as "scheduled offences".

The Special Criminal Court also has jurisdiction over non-scheduled offences where the Attorney-General certifies, under s. 47(2) of the Offences against the State Act 1939, that in his or her opinion the ordinary courts are "inadequate to secure the effective administration of justice in relation to the trial of such person on such charge". The Director of Public Prosecutions (DPP) exercises these powers of the Attorney-General by delegated authority.

== History ==
On 26 May 1972, the Government exercised its power to make a proclamation pursuant to Section 35(2) of the under the Offences against the State Act 1939 which led to the establishment of the Special Criminal Court for the trial of certain offences. The current court was first established by the Dáil under the Offences against the State Act 1939 to prevent the Irish Republican Army from subverting Ireland's neutrality during World War II and the Emergency. The current incarnation of the Special Criminal Court dates from 1972, just after the Troubles in Northern Ireland began.

Prior to May 1972, Provisional IRA volunteers in the Republic of Ireland were tried in normal courts. The three-judge Special Criminal Court was re-introduced following a series of regional court cases where IRA volunteers were acquitted or received light sentences from sympathetic juries and judges, and also to prevent jury tampering.

Although the court was initially set up to handle terrorism-related crime, its remit has been extended and it has been handling more organised crime cases since the Provisional IRA ceasefire in the 1990s. For instance, members of the drugs gang which murdered journalist Veronica Guerin were tried in the Special Criminal Court.

Section 35(4) and (5) of the Offences against the State Act 1939 provide that if at any time the Government or the Parliament is satisfied that the ordinary courts are again adequate to secure the effective administration of justice and the preservation of public peace and order, a rescinding proclamation or resolution, respectively, shall be made terminating the Special Criminal Court regime; to date, no such rescinding proclamation or resolution has been promulgated. Following the introduction of a regular Government review and assessment procedure on 14 January 1997, reviews taking into account the views of the relevant State agencies were carried out on 11 February 1997, 24 March 1998, and 14 April 1999, have concluded that the continuance of the Court was necessary, not only in view of the continuing threat to State security posed by instances of violence, but also of the particular threat to the administration of justice, including jury intimidation, from the rise of organised and ruthless criminal gangs, principally involved in drug-related and violent crime.

== Structure; second court ==
The court is composed of three judges appointed by the government from among the judges of the ordinary courts, usually one from the High Court, one from the Circuit Court and one from the District Court. The court sits as a three-judge panel with no jury, and verdicts are by majority vote. Verdicts can be appealed to the Court of Criminal Appeal.

On 8 February 2016, the Minister for Justice and Equality Frances Fitzgerald announced that a second Special Criminal Court would open on 4 April 2016 following a Government decision to establish a second non-jury Special Criminal Court to try terrorist and crime-gang offences.

== Criticism ==
The Special Criminal Court has been criticised by the Irish Council for Civil Liberties, Amnesty International and the United Nations Commission on Human Rights, for its procedures and for being a special court, which ordinarily should not be used against civilians. Among the criticisms are the lack of a jury, and the increasing use of the court to try organised "ordinary" crimes rather than the terrorist cases it was originally set up to handle. Critics also argue that the court is now obsolete since there is no longer a serious terrorist threat to the State (see: Northern Ireland peace process), although others disagree and cite the continuing violence from dissident republican terrorism, international terrorism and serious gangland crime.

Under the law, the court is authorised to accept the opinion of a Garda Síochána chief-superintendent as evidence that a suspect is a member of an illegal organisation. However, the court has been reluctant to convict on the word of a garda alone, without any corroborating evidence.

Sinn Féin had stated in the past that it was their intention to abolish the Special Criminal Court as they believed it was used to convict political prisoners in a juryless court. However, Sinn Féin are no longer in favour of its abolition. Some prominent Sinn Féin members (including Martin Ferris and Martin McGuinness) have been convicted of offences by it. In 1973 Martin McGuinness was tried at the SCC, which he refused to recognise, after being arrested near a car containing 250 pounds (110 kg) of explosives and nearly 5,000 rounds of ammunition. He was convicted and sentenced to six months imprisonment.

== Well-known cases ==
- In 1976 Marie and Noel Murray were sentenced to death by the court for the capital murder of Garda Michael Reynolds. The convictions were overturned on appeal and they were instead sentenced to life in prison for "ordinary" murder. They were released in 1992.
- One of the most famous is the case of Nicky Kelly, who was convicted along with two other men by the Special Criminal Court in 1978 of carrying out the Sallins Train Robbery. All three convictions were later overturned after it was found that the suspects had been assaulted by gardaí while in custody.
- In 1997 and 1998 John Gilligan, Patrick "Dutchy" Holland, Brian Meehan and Paul "Hippo" Ward were all tried by the Special Criminal Court on charges relating to the murder of journalist Veronica Guerin and drug trafficking charges. Paul "Hippo" Ward was convicted of the Guerin murder and sentenced to life in prison as an accomplice in the assassination. Brian Meehan was convicted on the testimony of gang member turned state's witness Russell Warren and was convicted of murdering Guerin, and sentenced to life imprisonment.
- In 1999 Pearse McAuley from Northern Ireland and three County Limerick men; Jeremiah Sheehy, Michael O'Neill and Kevin Walsh – all members of the Provisional IRA – were convicted by the non-jury Special Criminal Court of the killing of Detective Garda Jerry McCabe in Adare, Co. Limerick in June 1996. He was shot 3 times.
- In 2001, Colm Murphy was convicted of "conspiracy to cause an explosion likely to endanger life or cause injury" in connection with the Omagh bombing. In January 2005 Murphy's conviction was quashed and a retrial ordered by the Court of Criminal Appeal, on the grounds that two gardaí had falsified interview notes, and that Murphy's previous convictions were improperly taken into account by the trial judges. In 2009 Murphy was found liable for the bombing in a civil trial; he was cleared of criminal charges at the SCC in February 2010.
- In 2003, Michael McKevitt was convicted of "directing terrorism" and "membership of an illegal organisation" for his role as leader of the Real IRA.
- In 2013 Limerick gangland crime boss John Dundon was found guilty of the murder of rugby player Shane Geoghegan, mistakenly identified as a rival; he was sentenced to life in prison by the Special Criminal Court.
- In 2014, Wayne Dundon and Nathan Killeen were found guilty by the Special Criminal Court of the murder of Roy Collins in Limerick and sentenced to life imprisonment.
- The trial of Patrick Hutch for murder and possession of firearms for the 5 February 2016 shooting of David Byrne was set for January 2018 at the Special Criminal Court; he was denied bail. On 20 February 2019, all charges against Patrick Hutch were dropped and he walked free from court. As of August 2026, nobody has been convicted of murder in relation to David Byrne's death.
- In 2023 Gerry Hutch was acquitted of the murder of David Byrne.

== See also ==
- Courts of the Republic of Ireland
- Garda Special Detective Unit
- Diplock courts — Northern Ireland's equivalent of the Special Criminal Court
