= John Traynor (criminal) =

Irish criminal (1948–2021)

John "The Coach" Traynor
- Born: 1948; Dublin, Ireland
- Died: 24 October 2021 (aged 73); Kent, England
- Other name: The Coach
- Status: Served remainder of sentence and released from Highpoint Prison in September 2012
- Penalty: Bearer bond fraud, UK: 7 years Prostitution, Ireland; Drug smuggling, Money laundering, Ireland: confiscation of assets

John "the Coach" Traynor (1948 – 24 October 2021) was a major Irish organized crime figure who was a both a longtime confidential source for Irish investigative journalist Veronica Guerin and a prime suspect in allegedly arranging her 1996 contract killing.

== Career ==
Traynor was a central and important figure in the Dublin underworld. He had associations with the Irish National Liberation Army (INLA).

He initially worked with Martin Cahill's gang and eventually owned a derelict shop building that Cahill formerly owned in Arbour Hill. During the Garda Síochána investigation into Cahill's 1986 theft of the Beit-collection paintings from Russborough House, Blessington, County Wicklow, detectives believed that the paintings were stored for a time at Arbour Hill.

He transferred his allegiance to fellow former Cahill gang member, John Gilligan. He also associated with Gilligan gang members, Brian Meehan and Patrick Holland.

In 1992, he was arrested and convicted in England for his involvement in a scam involving bearer bonds stolen in the City bonds robbery. Jailed for seven years at HM Prison Highpoint North in Suffolk, Traynor was granted compassionate leave to visit his wife and children in Templeogue, but he never returned. Authorities in the UK eventually issued an international arrest warrant against Traynor.

=== Veronica Guerin ===
He returned to Gilligan's gang in Dublin and began building up a prostitution business based in a massage parlour. He also became a confidential source for journalist Guerin. On 30 January 1995, Traynor hired a gunman to shoot her in the leg at her home. At the time of her murder, in 1996, Traynor was seeking a High Court order against Guerin to prevent her from publishing a book about his involvement in organised crime.

Garda detectives believe that Traynor was involved in planning Guerin's murder. Gardaí believe that Traynor tipped off Gilligan about her whereabouts on the day she was murdered. According to later testimony by Gilligan, Traynor ordered the murder of Guerin without his knowledge or permission.

=== First Netherlands arrest ===
Traynor fled Ireland after Guerin was killed, initially to Portugal, and has never officially returned. He then moved across Europe, mainly between Spain and the Netherlands.

Arrested in 1997 with Brian Meehan, who drove the motorbike when Guerin was killed, he was later released without charge.

In the subsequent investigation by the Garda following Guerin's murder, Traynor was found to be involved in a wide variety of criminal enterprises. He was second in command to Gilligan, and the gang had operations from organising armed robberies to drug smuggling, embezzlement and prostitution. The Criminal Assets Bureau was later successful in the High Court, when a judgment mortgage was registered on the Arbour Hill shop, with the seizure of a significant portion of the disposal of a property owned by Traynor in Waterford.

=== Second Netherlands arrest and incarceration ===
On or around 22 August 2010, in a joint operation with the UK's Serious Organised Crime Agency, the Regiokorpsen (Dutch regional police) arrested Traynor in Amstelveen. After extradition, Traynor served the remainder of his sentence in medium security Highpoint Prison, where, after several heart attacks, he had to undergo a triple bypass. Traynor was released in September 2012 and was residing in a seaside town in Kent, as of 2013.

== Later life and death ==
Traynor later moved to Kent, England where he received palliative care in a hospice after being diagnosed with terminal cancer. He died on the 24th of October 2021, at the age of 73.
