= Patrick Holland (criminal) =

Irish bank robber (died 2009)

Patrick Eugene "Dutchy" Holland (1939 - 6 June 2009), was an Irish career criminal involved in armed robbery, arms trafficking, drug trafficking, and money laundering. He was also an alleged hitman well-known as the prime suspect in the 1996 contract killing of Irish investigative journalist Veronica Guerin. Holland denied committing the crime, however, until his death as a convict in HM Prison Parkhurst on the Isle of Wight in England.

== Life ==
In 1939, Holland was born in Chapelizod, Dublin and came from a middle-class family. A skilled association football player who once had trials with Arsenal FC, he emigrated to the United States in 1961, where he purportedly joined the US Marine Corps while living in Chicago. Returning to Ireland in the mid-1960s, his first conviction for handling stolen goods was obtained at the age of 26, whilst working as the manager of Donnelly’s sausage factory in the Coombe. Having married in his mid 30s, by the mid-1970s he was suspected by the Garda Síochána of carrying out a number of armed bank raids. In 1981 he was jailed for seven years for armed robbery at a hotel in Ballsbridge. Released after four years, in 1989 he was sentenced to ten years for possessing 7½lbs of Frangex explosive, detonators and fuse wire, allegedly for supply to the IRA. Although Holland had sympathies for and associations with both the Irish National Liberation Army and the Irish Republican Army, he was never a member of either organization.

Whilst in jail, he met John Gilligan and members of his gang, whom he joined on release in 1994. Whilst running a legitimate printing business as the front for a forgery operation, Holland was suspected by the Gardaí of becoming a freelance assassin in the mid-1990s, implicated in but never convicted of the contract killings of: Patrick Shanahan, shot in Crumlin in October 1994; publican Tom Nevin, shot in Jack White's Inn, County Wicklow, in March 1996; Johnny Reddin, shot in a pub off Parnell Street, Dublin, in April 1996. In later interviews, while admitting to being a prolific armed robber and a master forger, Holland denied having ever worked as a hitman or even having fired a gun in the commission of a crime.

Working alongside Charles Bowden in Gilligan's drugs gang, it was Bowden who supplied the gun which killed Guerin, a meeting attended by Holland. In 1997 while acting as a Garda witness, Bowden named Holland in a Dublin court as the man he supplied the .357 Magnum gun to, and hence suspected of shooting Guerin. In the wake of Guerin's killing, a period in which the Garda and the Criminal Assets Bureau made over 150 arrests to clear up Ireland's illegal drug problem, Holland was arrested at Dún Laoghaire ferry port on 9 April 1997. Initially arrested for involvement in Guerin's murder, after an inspection of his premises and assets he was eventually charged for possession and distribution of 10 kilograms (22 lb) of cannabis. During the trial in Dublin, Gardaí officer Marion Cusack said that she believed Holland was the gunman who killed Guerin in her car. Holland was also named by Charles Bowden as the person who fired the fatal shots. Sentenced to 20 years for drug distribution, it was reduced to 12 years on appeal. The CAB subsequently seized a small house near Brittas, County Wicklow, in compensation. Whilst in Portlaoise Prison, he befriended Colm Murphy, the first person to be convicted in connection with the Omagh bombing, but was resisted by his fellow members of the Real IRA from entering their area of the jail.

Released from Portlaoise in April 2006, he flew to Rome, Italy where his lawyer Giovanni Di Stefano had arranged a series of psychological tests and press interviews, in which Holland strongly denied the murder of Guerin. Invited to appear on The Late Late Show, under public and political pressure the editorial board of RTÉ vetoed the interview.

Holland began mixing with a major Finglas drugs gang headed by Martin "Marlo" Hyland. After the Gardaí raided one of Hyland's houses and found Holland there, he made his way to England.

In May 2007, a year after being released from jail in Ireland, Holland was arrested by the Metropolitan Police in London, who were investigating a honey trap plot to kidnap a businessman for a £10 million ransom. After a month-long trial the jury unanimously convicted Holland together with John McDonnell, Gerard Booth and Khan Coombs of conspiracy to kidnap. Whilst serving the subsequent eight-year term, he was found dead in his cell at HMP Parkhurst, Isle of Wight on the morning of 6 June 2009.

After his death, it emerged that Holland was planning to write an autobiography, having collated his notes via a series of recorded cassette tapes. These were handed by his family to the Irish Sunday Mirror, which subsequently published a series of articles in which Holland claimed that: yes, he was a bank robber by the early 1970s; he had set up a money-laundering network across Europe to hide his fortune from the CAB; he again denied the murder of Guerin.
