= Veronica Guerin =

Irish crime reporter (1958–1996)

- Guerin in the 1990s
- Born: 5 July 1958; Dublin, Ireland
- Died: 26 June 1996 (aged 37); Naas Dual Carriageway, Newlands Cross, Dublin, Ireland
- Cause of death: Gunshot wounds
- Education: Trinity College Dublin
- Occupations: Accountant, journalist
- Years active: 1990–1996
- Notable credits: The Sunday Business Post; Sunday Tribune; Sunday Independent
- Spouse: Graham Turley (m. 1985)
- Children: 1
- Relatives: Jimmy Guerin (brother)

Veronica Guerin Turley (5 July 1958 – 26 June 1996) was an Irish investigative journalist focusing on organised crime in Ireland, who was murdered in a contract killing believed to have been ordered by a South Dublin-based drug cartel. Born in Dublin, she was an athlete in school and later played on the Irish national teams for both association football and basketball. After studying accountancy she ran a public-relations firm for seven years, before working for Fianna Fáil and as an election agent for Seán Haughey. She became a reporter in 1990, writing for the Sunday Business Post and Sunday Tribune. In 1994 she began writing articles about the Irish criminal underworld for the Sunday Independent. In 1996, after pressing charges for assault against major organised crime figure John Gilligan, Guerin was ambushed and fatally shot in her vehicle while waiting at a traffic light. The shooting caused national outrage in Ireland. Investigation into her death led to a number of arrests and convictions.

== Early and personal life ==
The daughter of Christopher and Bernadette, Guerin was nicknamed "Ronnie". She and her four siblings were born and brought up in Artane, Dublin, and attended St. Mary's secondary school in Killester where she excelled in athletics. Besides basketball and camogie, aged 15 she played in the All-Ireland football finals with a slipped disc. She played for both the Ireland women's national basketball team and Republic of Ireland women's national football team, representing the latter in a match against England at Dalymount Park in May 1981. Her brother Jimmy has been a member of Fingal County Council since 2014.

Guerin studied accountancy at Trinity College Dublin. She married Graham Turley in 1985, and the couple had a son, Cathal (born 1989). She was a supporter of Manchester United football team; her prized possession was a photo of her and Eric Cantona taken on a visit to Old Trafford.

== PR career: 1983–1990 ==
After she graduated, her father employed her at his company, but, following his death three years later, she changed professions and started a public relations firm in 1983, which she ran for seven years.

In 1983–84, she served as secretary to the Fianna Fáil group at the New Ireland Forum. She served as Charles Haughey's personal assistant, and became a family friend, taking holidays with his children. In 1987 she served as election agent and party treasurer in Dublin North for Seán Haughey.

== Journalism career: 1990–1996 ==
In 1990, she changed careers again, switching to journalism as a reporter with the Sunday Business Post and Sunday Tribune, working under editor Damien Kiberd. Craving first-hand information, she pursued a story directly to the source with little regard for her personal safety, to engage those she deemed central to a story. This allowed her to build close relationships with both the legitimate authorities, such as the Garda Síochána (police), and the criminals, with both sides respecting her diligence by providing highly detailed information. She also reported on Irish Republican Army activities in Ireland.

From 1994 onwards, she began to write about criminals for the Sunday Independent. Using her accountancy knowledge to trace the proceeds of illegal activity, she used street names or pseudonyms for underworld figures to avoid Irish libel laws.

When she began to cover drug dealers and gained information from convicted drugs criminal John Traynor, she received numerous death threats. The first violence against her occurred in October 1994, when two shots were fired into her home after her story on murdered crime kingpin Martin Cahill was published. Guerin dismissed the "warning". The day after writing an article on Gerry "The Monk" Hutch, on 30 January 1995, she answered her doorbell to a man pointing a pistol at her head, but the gunman missed and shot her in the leg. Ballistic checks later established that the same gun was used in both shootings. Regardless, she vowed to continue her investigations. Independent Newspapers installed a security system to protect her, and the Gardaí gave her a 24-hour escort; however, she did not approve of this, saying that it hampered her work.

On 13 September 1995, convicted criminal John Gilligan, Traynor's boss, attacked her when she confronted him about his lavish lifestyle with no source of income. Gilligan's gang had imported over 20,000 kilograms of cannabis resin between July 1994 and October 1996, with an estimated street value of £180 million. He later phoned her at home and threatened to kidnap and rape her son, and have her shot dead if she wrote anything about him.

Guerin received the International Press Freedom Award from the Committee to Protect Journalists in December 1995.

== Assassination and funeral ==
Location of Guerin's murder

Gilligan's threats over the phone were overheard by her barrister, Felix McElroy, who went with Guerin to make an official statement to Gardaí, from the result of which Gilligan was charged with assault. Gilligan's assault case caused huge concern with his drugs gang, as he was the only one that had business dealing with the European sources of the hashish and if he went to prison they feared that their entire drug importation system would collapse. Brian Meehan was later quoted by Charles Bowden in saying that Gilligan had said "he was going to have something done about her". On the evening of 25 June 1996, gang members Charles Bowden, Brian Meehan and Peter Mitchell met at the Greenmount Industrial Estate, where Bowden serviced and then loaded a Colt Python revolver with .357 Magnum semiwadcutter bullets. On the same day, John Gilligan departed from Dublin and flew to Amsterdam via commercial airline.

On the morning of 26 June 1996, Guerin appeared at Naas District Court on a speeding charge. At around 12:30pm, she left the courthouse to drive her red Opel Calibra back to Dublin. During this time, Guerin was under covert surveillance by gang member Russell Warren, who was in constant phone contact with both John Gilligan and Brian Meehan giving updates to her location. Warren would later recall that when speaking to Meehan, who had a hands free phone, he could hear the sound of a motorbike engine at all times. At around 12:55pm, Guerin stopped at a red traffic light on the Naas Dual Carriageway near Newlands Cross. A Kawasaki motorbike with two passengers suddenly stopped beside her car, then the pillion passenger smashed her driver side window with the butt of a handgun before opening fire six times, killing Guerin almost instantly.

About an hour after Guerin was murdered, a meeting took place in Moore Street, Dublin, between Bowden, Meehan, and Mitchell. Bowden later denied under oath in court that the purpose of the meeting was the disposal of the weapon, but that it was an excuse to appear in a public setting to place them away from the incident.

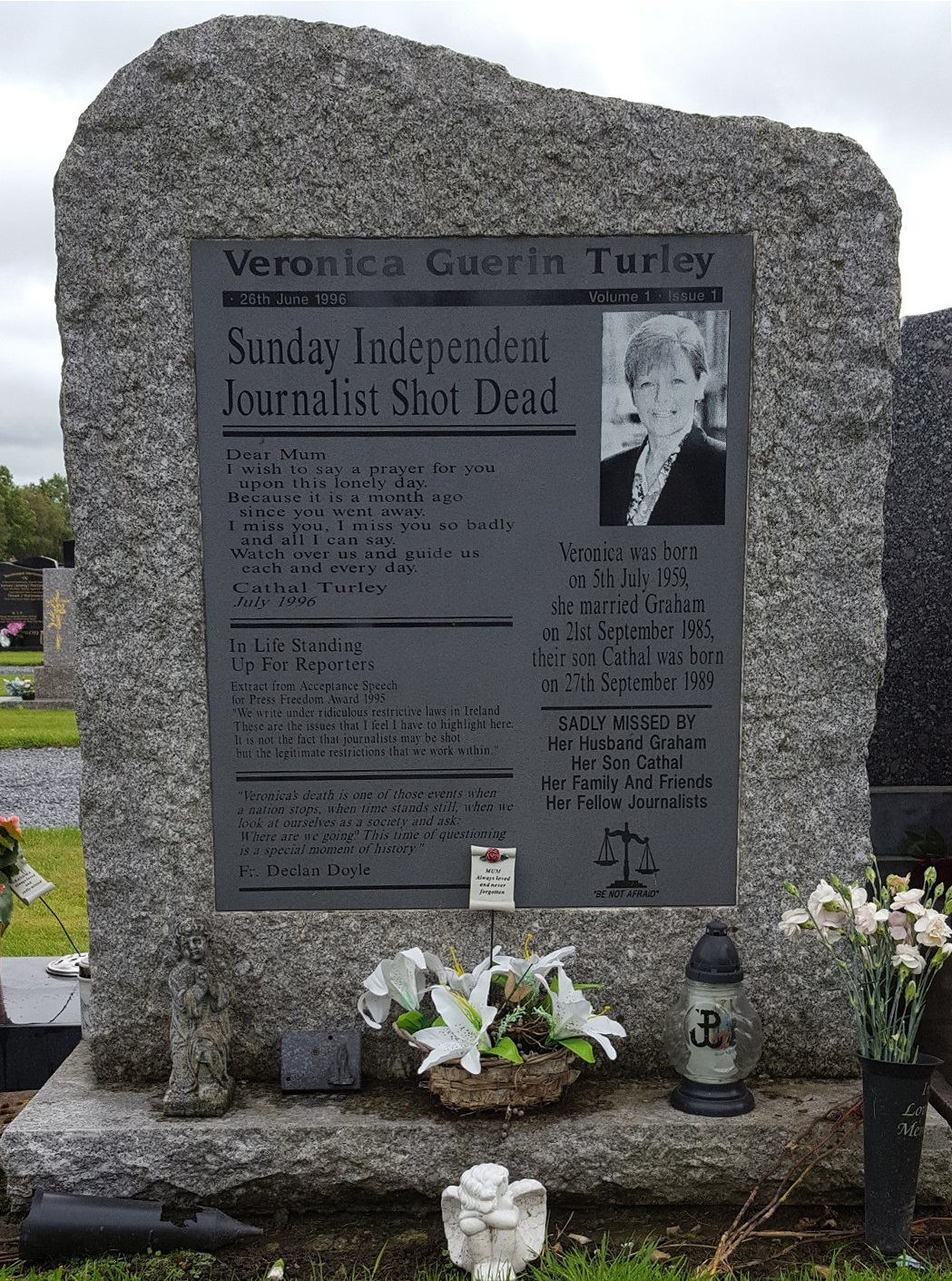
Veronica Guerin's grave in Dardistown

At the time of her murder, Traynor was seeking a High Court order against Guerin to prevent her from publishing a book about his involvement in organised crime. Guerin was killed two days before she was due to speak at a Freedom Forum conference in London. The topic of her segment was "Dying to Tell the Story: Journalists at Risk".

Her funeral service, on 29 June 1996 at a church in Dublin Airport, was attended by Ireland's Taoiseach John Bruton, and the head of the armed forces. It was covered live by Raidió Teilifís Éireann. On 4 July, labour unions across Ireland called for a moment of silence in her memory, which was duly observed by people around the country. Guerin is buried in Dardistown Cemetery, County Dublin. In early July 1996, assault charges were officially struck out against Gilligan due to the death of the only witness in the case, Veronica Guerin.

== Aftermath ==
Guerin's murder caused outrage, and Taoiseach John Bruton called it "an attack on democracy". The Oireachtas, the Irish parliament, realised the potential of using tax enforcement laws as a means of deterring and punishing criminals. Within a week of her murder, it enacted the Proceeds of Crime Act 1996 and the Criminal Assets Bureau Act 1996, so that assets purchased with money obtained through crime could be seized by the government. This led to the formation of the Criminal Assets Bureau (CAB).

After the murder of Guerin, Charles Bowden was arrested as were the other members of Gilligan's gang who were still in Ireland. In an agreement with the Attorney General of Ireland, Bowden agreed to turn state's witness, and become the first person to enter the Republic's Witness Security Programme. Granted immunity from prosecution for the murder of Guerin, he was the only witness to give evidence against all four drug gang members at their trials in the Special Criminal Court: Patrick Holland, Paul "Hippo" Ward, Brian Meehan and John Gilligan. The investigation into Guerin's death resulted in over 150 other arrests and convictions, as well as seizures of drugs and arms. Drug crime in Ireland dropped 15 percent in the following 12 months. Four months after Guerin's murder, in October 1996, there was a sharp decline in the sex ratio at birth in Ireland, an indicator of societal stress levels, which fell to 0.5 from an anticipated value of more than 0.51.

In 1997, while acting as a Garda witness, Bowden named Patrick "Dutchy" Holland in court as the man he supplied the gun to, and hence suspected of shooting Guerin. Holland was never convicted of the murder, and he denied the accusation until his death in June 2009 while in prison in the UK.

In November 1998, after evidence from Bowden and others, Paul "Hippo" Ward was convicted of the murder and sentenced to life in prison as an accomplice, because he had disposed of the murder weapon and the motorbike. This conviction was later overturned on appeal.

Brian Meehan fled to Amsterdam with Traynor (who later escaped to Portugal). After the court dismissed additional evidence from Bowden, Meehan was convicted on the testimony of gang member turned state's witness Russell Warren, who had followed Guerin's movements in the hours before the murder, and then called Meehan on a mobile phone with the details. Meehan was convicted of murdering Guerin, and sentenced to life imprisonment. He is the only individual serving a life sentence for his role in the murder.

John Gilligan left Ireland the day before Guerin was murdered, on a flight to Amsterdam. He was arrested 12 months later in the United Kingdom trying to board a flight for Amsterdam after a routine search of his baggage revealed $500,000 in cash. Claiming it was the proceeds of gambling, he was charged with money laundering. After a three-year legal battle, he was extradited to Ireland on 3 February 2000. Tried and acquitted of Guerin's murder, he was later convicted of importing 20 tonnes of cannabis and sentenced to 28 years in prison, reduced to 20 years on appeal.

Pursued by CAB, in January 2008, Gilligan made a court appearance in an attempt to stop the Irish State from selling off his assets. He accused Traynor of having ordered Guerin's murder without his permission. Despite the presiding judge's attempt to silence Gilligan, he continued to blame a botched Gardaí investigation and planted evidence as the reason for his current imprisonment. Traynor had fled to Portugal after Guerin's murder, and having been on the run from British authorities since 1992, resided mainly in Spain and the Netherlands from 1996 onwards. After a failed extradition from the Netherlands in 1997, which brought Meehan back to Ireland, in 2010 Traynor was arrested after a joint UK SOCA/Regiokorpsen operation in Amsterdam. Traynor, as of 2013, was living in Kent, England after serving time in an English prison. Traynor died in 2021 of cancer.

Turley remarried in 2011. Guerin and Turley's son, Cathal Turley, relocated to Dubai and, as of 2021, manages an Irish pub at the Dubai World Trade Centre.

== Memorials and legacy ==
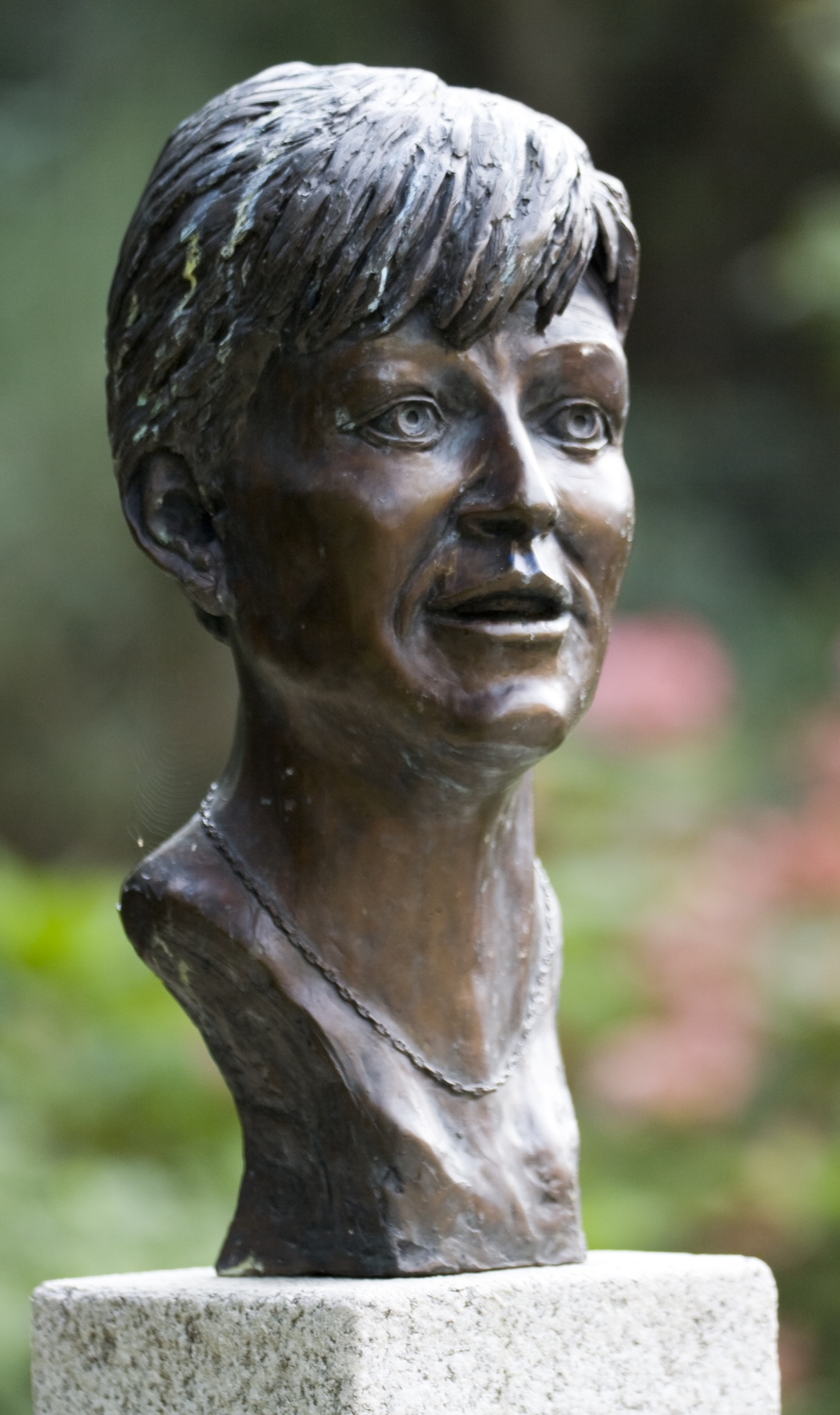
Monument to Guerin in Dublin Castle gardens

A memorial statue to Guerin is located in Dubh Linn Gardens, in the grounds of Dublin Castle.

On 2 May 1997, at a ceremony in Arlington, Virginia, her name and those of 38 other international journalists who died in the line of duty in 1996 were added to the Freedom Forum Journalists Memorial. Her husband addressed the audience: "Veronica stood for freedom to write. She stood as light, and wrote of life in Ireland today, and told the truth. Veronica was not a judge, nor was she a juror, but she paid the ultimate price with the sacrifice of her life."

In 2000, Guerin was named as one of the International Press Institute's 50 World Press Freedom Heroes of the past 50 years.

In 2007, the Veronica Guerin Memorial Scholarship was set up at Dublin City University, offering a bursary intended to meet the cost of fees and part of the general expenses of an MA in Journalism student who wishes to specialise in investigative journalism.

In May 2019, DCU named a prominent lecture theatre in honour of Veronica Guerin, as part of the university's Women in Leadership initiative and Project 50:50. The Guerin family attended the official naming event.

Two films have been based on her story: When the Sky Falls (2000), starring Joan Allen as Sinead Hamilton and Veronica Guerin (2003), starring Cate Blanchett. A biography titled Veronica Guerin: The Life and Death of a Crime Reporter by Emily O'Reilly, published in 1998, questions the ethics of Guerin's methods of gathering information, and those of the underlying media establishment. Guerin's murder was a main inspiration and plot point of progressive metal band Savatage's 1997 concept album The Wake of Magellan.

== See also ==
- List of journalists killed in Europe
