= Martin Foley =

Martin Foley may refer to:

- Martin Foley (criminal)
- Martin Foley (politician)
