= St. Mary's Park (Limerick) =

Housing estate in Ireland

St. Mary's Park is a housing estate in Limerick, Ireland. The estate is located on the northern end of King's Island in an area known locally as the Island Field. The area is located to the north of the historic and ancient city of Limerick which is located in Englishtown located on the southern half of King's Island.

The Island Field area was originally accessed from the walled Englishtown in medieval times via a gate in the wall called Island Gate. The estate was completed on 19 August 1935 and is one of the oldest corporation estates in Limerick. The first residents moved from slums in the Lady's Lane, Parnell Street & Palmerstown areas of the city.

St Mary's Park currently consists of:

- 463 houses, of which 273 (59%) are privately owned, and 190 (41%) are local authority owned.
- A frontage of approximately 2 km on to the Shannon and Abbey rivers, with an embankment to control flooding that also functions as an attractive riverside walk.
- A Special Area of Conservation of 10.7 hectares along the eastern edge of the Island, fronting on to the Abbey River, which extends along the banks of the Abbey and Shannon rivers.
- Two soccer clubs on a combined site of 3 hectares, with short-term leases from Limerick City Council.
- A modest community centre in the south-west corner with crèche adjacent.
- Extensive open space that is low lying and generally neglected.

St. Mary's Park is one of the more impoverished areas in Limerick city that has suffered from anti-social behaviour and high crime rates including gun and knife violence. Since 2017, St. Mary's Park has ranked as the most disadvantaged area in the entire country. It is classed as "extremely disadvantaged" by the Pobal index with high unemployment, a very high percentage of lone-parents, and low educational attainment. Along with Moyross, Southill, and Ballinacurra weston, St. Mary's Park will be the focus of a regeneration process with the goal of making the area a safer and more prosperous place for its residents.

The estate was built in the early 1930s and, at the time, was seen as a very desirable place to live. The estate is locally known as The Island Field and is built on King's Island. The island is connected to the mainland by Thomond Bridge and Baal's Bridge.
