= Psi =

Psi, PSI or Ψ may refer to:

== Alphabetic letters ==
- Psi (Greek) (Ψ or ψ), the twenty-third letter of the Greek alphabet
- Psi (Cyrillic), letter of the early Cyrillic alphabet, adopted from Greek

== Arts and entertainment ==
=== Comics ===
- Psi (comics), DC Comics character
- Psi Division, division in the Judge Dredd and 2000 AD series of comics
- Psi-Force, comic series
- Psi-Hawk, comic character
- Psi Lords, comic series

=== Music ===
- PSI (album), by Pitchshifter (2002)
- Psi Com, 1980s rock band
- "Psi Power", song by rock group Hawkwind (1978)
- Psi Records, music record label
- PSI Records, music record label
- Ψ CMX DVD, Finnish language video album by CMX
- Pitch Shifter Industries, acronym used by the British band Pitchshifter
- Logo used by Twenty One Pilots during their Scaled and Icy (2021) album era

=== Other uses in arts and entertainment ===
- Psi (TV series), Brazil
- Psi Corps, in the Babylon 5 fictional universe
- Psi Factor: Chronicles of the Paranormal, Canadian television series
- Psi-Ops: The Mindgate Conspiracy, 2004 video game

=== Other uses in arts and entertainment ===
- Psionics, a science fiction concept

== Organizations ==
=== Government and politics ===
- Italian Socialist Party (Partito Socialista Italiano), socialist and later social-democratic political party in Italy
- Italian Socialist Party (2007), social-democratic political party in Italy
- Indonesian Solidarity Party (Partai Solidaritas Indonesia)
- Indonesian Socialist Party (Partai Sosialis Indonesia)
- Pharmaceutical Society of Ireland
- Proliferation Security Initiative, against weapons technology transfer
- Public Sector Information, as in:
  - The 2003 EU Directive on the re-use of public sector information
  - The UK Office of Public Sector Information (OPSI), formerly HMSO
- United States Senate Homeland Security Permanent Subcommittee on Investigations

=== Other organizations ===
- Paul Scherrer Institute, research institute in Villigen, Switzerland
- Pechersk School International, Kyiv, Ukraine
- Physics Society of Iran
- Planetary Science Institute, Tucson, Arizona, US
- Poetry Slam, Inc., promoting poetry
- Policy Studies Institute, UK research organization
- Population Services International, global health organization
- Professional Skills Institute, technical school in Maumee, Ohio, US
- Prudential Securities Incorporated, financial services company
- PSI Seminars, on awareness training
- Public Services International, trades unions federation
- Statisticians in the Pharmaceutical Industry

== Parapsychology ==
- Psi (parapsychology), psychic or paranormal phenomena
- Psi hit, parapsychological experimentation term
- Paranormal Site Investigators, in the UK

== Science, technology, and mathematics ==
=== Biology and medicine ===
- PSI (prion), infectious protein in yeast
- Pandemic severity index, former US CDC influenza scale
- Photosystem I, protein complex involved in photosynthesis
- Pneumonia severity index
- Protein Structure Initiative, of the U.S. NIGMS

=== Computing ===
- Psi (instant messaging client), XMPP client program
- Potentially Shippable Increment, in the Scrum software development methodology
- Program-specific information, part of the MPEG transport stream protocol
- Pressure stall information, a Linux kernel patch for out of memory management

=== Cryptography ===
- Private set intersection, a cryptographic technique to compute the intersection of two encrypted sets

=== Economics ===
- PSI-20, Lisbon, Portugal stock market index
- Private sector involvement, in sovereign debt crisis resolution

=== Engineering ===
- "Yaw" angle, one of the Euler angles, denoted ψ in aerospace engineering
- Present serviceability index, a pavement performance indicator introduced by AASHTO

=== Places ===
- Psi Islands, in the Melchior Islands, Antarctica

=== Mathematics ===
- Chebyshev function
- Dedekind psi function
- Digamma function
- Polygamma functions
- Stream function, in two-dimensional flows
- Polar tangential angle of a curve
- Probability of ultimate ruin, in ruin theory
- Supergolden ratio
- Reciprocal Fibonacci constant
- Population Stability Index (Kullback–Leibler divergence#Symmetrised divergence)

=== Physics and chemistry ===
- Pound per square inch, unit of pressure
- PSI (computational chemistry), software
- J/psi meson, subatomic particle
- Porous silicon ("PS" or "pSi"), a form of silicon with introduced nanopores in its microstructure
- Water potential, denoted Ψ, in physical chemistry, the potential energy of a water solution relative to pure water
- Wave function, denoted ψ, in quantum mechanics

=== Psychology ===
- Psychology or psychologist, denoted Ψ, used in the logo of various psychological associations
- Psi Chi, the National Honor Society in psychology
- Psi-theory, theory about the human mind, a cognitive architecture
- Psychiatric Solutions, Inc., corporation that owns psychiatric hospitals

== Other uses ==
- Parasocial interaction, non-reciprocal interactions, as between a fanbase and a performer
- Permanent staff instructor, in the British Army
- Personalized System of Instruction
- Pollutant Standards Index, air pollution measure
- Pre-shipment inspection, method of quality control
- Presentence investigation report, investigation into the history of person convicted of a crime
- Proto-Siouan language (PSi), the reconstructed ancestor of the Western Siouan languages

== See also ==
- Psy (disambiguation)
- PS1 (disambiguation)
