= Psion =

Psion or Psions may refer to:

== Fiction ==
- Psion (comics), a DC Comics extraterrestrial species

=== Gaming ===
- Psion (role-playing games) a character class in role-playing games
  - Psion (Dungeons & Dragons), a character class in Dungeons & Dragons
- Psions (Freedom City), a supervillain team in the campaign setting Freedom City
- Psions, a fictional species with psychic abilities in the role-playing game Trinity
- Psions, a fictional extraterrestrial species with psychic abilities in the video game series Destiny
- Psions, a group of antagonists in the video game Into the Breach

=== Literature ===
- Psion, a fictitious "unit of mental energy" in the novella The Greatest Invention by Jack Williamson
  - Psion, a person with psionic abilities
- Psion, a 1982 novel by Joan D. Vinge
- Rhon psions, a fictional group of empaths and telepaths in the novel series Saga of the Skolian Empire
- Psion (想子), a fictional non-physical particle and psychic phenomenon, the essence of magic in the web novel series The Irregular at Magic High School

== Science and technology ==
- Psion, the J/psi meson subatomic particle
- Psion (company), a British mobile computer company

== See also ==
- Psi (disambiguation)
- Psyche (disambiguation)
- Psychic (disambiguation)
- Psychotronics (disambiguation)
