= Psychology (disambiguation) =

Psychology is the scientific study of the mind and behavior. The terms, psychology and psychological may also refer to the:

- Psychology (journal), a semiannual double-blind, peer-reviewed psychology journal published by Vilnius University
- "Psychology" (short story), a 1920 short story by Katherine Mansfield
- Psychology (album), a 2005 album by Chris Staples
- "Psychological", a 2006 song by the Pet Shop Boys from their album Fundamental
- "Psychological" (song), a 2026 song by the Band Perry

== See also ==
- Psych (disambiguation)
- Psychologist
