= Physick =

Physick may refer to:

- An archaic term for a laxative, or for the practice of medicine generally, in pre-modern medicine
- Emlen Physick Estate, Victorian house museum in Cape May, New Jersey, located at 1048 Washington Street
- Hill-Keith-Physick House in Philadelphia, Pennsylvania, was a home of Philip Syng Physick
- Philip Syng Physick (1768–1837), American physician born in Philadelphia, called "father of American surgery"
- The Physick Book of Deliverance Dane, the first novel written by Katherine Howe

== See also ==
- Physic (disambiguation)
- Physics (disambiguation)
