= Baiba =

- Gender: Female
- Language: Latvian
- Name day: December 4 (Latvia)

Origin
- Derivation: From a diminutive form of Barbara
- Region of origin: Latvia

Baiba is a feminine Latvian given name. The associated name day is December 4. Notable people with the name include:

- Baiba Bendika (born 1991), Latvian biathlete
- Baiba Bičole (1931–2021), Latvian-American poet
- Baiba Braže (born 1966), Latvian politician and diplomat
- Baiba Broka (born 1973), Latvian actress
- Baiba Broka (born 1975), Latvian lawyer and politician
- Baiba Caune (1945–2014), Latvian track and road racing cyclist
- Baiba Eglīte (born 1989), Latvian basketball player
- Baiba Indriksone (1932–2024), Latvian actress
- Baiba Saulite (1978–2006), Latvian murder victim
- Baiba Sipeniece-Gavare (born 1970), Latvian humorist, actress and television and radio presenter
- Baiba Skride (born 1981), Latvian classical violinist
