= Psych (disambiguation) =

Psych is an American detective comedy-drama television series.

Psych may also refer to:

== Mind ==
- Psychology
  - psychologist
- Psychiatry
  - psychiatrist
- Psychoanalysis
  - psychoanalyst
- AP Psych, a U.S. educational exam and course
- IB Psych, an educational course for international baccalaureate
- motivation (to psych up)
- intimidation (to psych out)
- Psych (journal), an academic journal
- Psych ops, in warfare
- American Psychiatric Association (Psych.org)
- College of Psychologists of Ontario (C. Psych.)

== Film and television ==
- Psych: The Musical, a 2013 episode of the TV show
- Psych (film series) (2017–present), a film series based on the TV show
  - Psych: The Movie, a 2017 American telefilm
  - Psych 2: Lassie Come Home, a 2020 American streaming film
  - Psych 3: This Is Gus, a 2021 American streaming film
- "Psych" (Medium), a 2009 TV episode of Medium

== Other uses ==
- Psych (comics), a fictional character from DC Comics
- Psychic bid, also called "psych", a play in the contract bridge card game

== See also ==
- Obed Psych, Ghanaian-Canadian musician
- Psych 9, a 2010 horror film
- PsychOpen, a European open-access publisher
- PubPsych, an open-access retrieval system
- Psy (disambiguation)
- Psyche (disambiguation)
- Psychic (disambiguation)
- Psychedelic (disambiguation)
- Psycho (disambiguation)
- Psychology (disambiguation)
- Shrink (disambiguation)
