= Peter Judge =

Peter Judge may refer to:

- F. J. McCormick (1889–1947), Irish actor, real name Peter Judge
- Peter Judge (cricketer) (1916–1992), English cricketer
- PJ Judge (1956–1996), Irish criminal
