= Psi-missing =

Psi-missing may refer to:

- Psi hit, the parapsychological experimentation term
- Psi-missing (Mami Kawada song), the Opening Theme for the anime series Toaru Majutsu no Index
