= Psycho =

Psycho may refer to:

== Psychology ==
- Psychopath
- Sociopath
- Someone with a personality disorder
- Someone with a psychological disorder
  - Someone with psychosis

== People with the nickname ==
- Karl Amoussou or Psycho, mixed martial artist
- Peter Ebdon or Psycho, English snooker player
- Steve Lyons (baseball) or Psycho, utility baseball player
- Joe Mazzulla or the Psycho, American basketball coach
- Jacob Noe or the Psycho, mixed martial artist
- Stuart Pearce or Psycho, English football player and manager
- Bull Pain or Psycho, American professional wrestler
- Psycho (wrestler), Japanese professional wrestler
- PJ Judge or the Psycho, Irish criminal

== Arts and media ==
=== Fictional characters ===
- Krieg the Psycho, video game character in Borderlands 2
- Sgt. Michael "Psycho" Sykes, video game character in Crysis
- The Psycho, video game character in Until Dawn
- Psycho Weasel, film character in Who Framed Roger Rabbit

=== Films ===
- Psycho (franchise), an American horror thriller franchise based on the Bloch novel
  - Psycho (1960 film), by Alfred Hitchcock
  - Psycho (1998 film), a remake of the original film by Gus Van Sant starring Vince Vaughn
- Psycho (2008 film)
- Psycho (2013 film)
- Psycho (2020 film)
- Psycho (2026 film), a Pakistani psychological thriller

=== Literature ===
- Psycho (novel), a 1959 book by Robert Bloch
- Psycho (brand), a Japanese visual novel studio
- PsychoPublishing, an imprint of the German group VDM Publishing

=== Music ===
==== Songs ====
- "Psycho" (Anne-Marie and Aitch song)
- "Psycho" (Asking Alexandria song)
- "Psycho" (Dixie D'Amelio song)
- "Psycho" (Lords of the Underground song)
- "Psycho" (Imelda May song)
- "Psycho" (Muse song)
- "Psycho" (Maisie Peters song)
- "Psycho" (Post Malone song)
- "Psycho" (Puddle of Mudd song)
- "Psycho" (Red Velvet song)
- "Psycho" (Hardy song)
- "Psycho", by Babymonster from We Go Up
- "Psycho", by Breaking Benjamin from Ember
- "Psycho", by Caroline's Spine from Monsoon
- "Psycho", by Dave from Psychodrama
- "Psycho", by 50 Cent from Before I Self Destruct
- "Psycho", by Hakos Baelz from Pandæmonium
- "Psycho", by iamnot from Whoami
- "Psycho", by Lower Class Brats
- "Psycho", by Leon Payne
- "Psycho", by Mia Rodriguez
- "Psycho", by Rebound!
- "Psycho", by Scooter from Back to the Heavyweight Jam
- "Psycho", by Soyeon, 2021
- "Psycho", by the Sonics
- "Psycho", by System of a Down from Toxicity
- "Psycho", by 12 Stones from Beneath the Scars
- "Psycho", by Tommy Lee Sparta

==== Other uses in music ====
- Psycho Records, a late 1970s UK record label
- The Psychos, a New York hardcore band
- Psycho (soundtrack), the soundtrack album to the 1998 remake of Psycho
- Psycho (album), by That's Outrageous!

=== Other uses in arts and media ===
- Psychos (TV series), a British television drama broadcast in 1999
- Psychiatrist (game) or Psycho, a party game
- Psycho, a type of drug in the Fallout series of video games
- "Psycho", an episode of Scream: The TV Series

== Other uses ==
- Psycho Donuts, a donut store in Canada and Northern America
- Psycho (automaton), a card-playing automaton created in the late 19th century

== See also ==
- Syco, British entertainment company
- Psyco, a just-in-time compiler for the Python programming language
- Psy (disambiguation)
- Psych (disambiguation)
- Psyche (disambiguation)
- Psychic (disambiguation)
- Psychedelic (disambiguation)
