= Eamon Kelly (criminal) =

Irish drug trafficker (1947-2012)

Eamon Kelly (1947 – 4 December 2012) was a high-profile Irish convicted drug trafficker and former crime leader.

== Early life ==
Raised in Dublin, his criminal career began in his teens. He associated with members of the Official Irish Republican Army in the early 1980s.

He mentored crime lord Eamon Dunne who was murdered in 2010. He also mentored Gerry Hutch and Martin "Marlo" Hyland.

In 1988, Kelly was charged and sentenced (after an appeal) for three years in prison for assault near Gardiner Place in Dublin. In 1993, he was convicted of smuggling nearly 1 kilogram of cocaine worth €50,000 from his Miami, Florida and Cuban contacts. He was sentenced to fourteen years. He was known for his interactions with Ireland's most dangerous criminals.

Security intelligence believes that he and other senior criminals ordered the death of Eamonn Dunne in 2010.

In 2010 he and Troy Jordan were arrested by Gardaí investigating a debt collection business. After this, he was widowed and one of his sons, who was addicted to illegal drugs, died.

== Dispute with RIRA ==
The Real Irish Republican Army disliked his friendship with Dessie O'Hare, who often stayed with Kelly. Their dislike was so great they refused to let Declan "Wacker" Duffy, another INLA member, join them. Kelly was also suspected of being responsible for the murder of RIRA member Alan Ryan.

== Attempts on his life ==
He once managed to escape a failed assassination attempt on his life on 11 September 2010 in Furry Park Road in Killester when the attacker's gun jammed. On 4 December 2012, at the same location in Killester, while Kelly was walking to his home he was shot three times in the chest and was rushed to Beaumont Hospital where he later died.

The New IRA are suspected of his murder.
