= Eamon Dunne =

Irish criminal

- Dunne c. 2009
- Born: February 17, 1976; Dublin, Ireland
- Died: April 23, 2010 (aged 34); Cabra, Dublin, Ireland
- Cause of death: Shot dead by own associates
- Resting place: Dardistown Cemetery
- Other name: "The Don"

Eamon Dunne (17 February 1976 – 23 April 2010) was an Irish crime boss from Finglas in North Dublin. Nicknamed "the Don" by media outlets, Dunne led a gang based in Finglas, Cabra, and Ballymun, who were involved in drug dealing, armed robbery, extortion and murder. Linked to at least a dozen murders during his life, he was described by Garda sources as "the worst" they had ever seen by number of murders, and was considered Ireland's "public enemy number one" at the time of his murder in 2010.

Originally a member of a gang led by Martin "Marlo" Hyland, Dunne filled the power vacuum after Hyland was shot dead in December 2006, in an assassination Dunne was believed to have been the getaway driver for. Dunne was suspected to have ordered at least a dozen gangland murders over the next three years, as he consolidated his position by having rivals and suspected Garda informers killed. Increased Garda attention brought on by his frequent murders and increasingly erratic behaviour, fuelled by his heavy cocaine usage, led to his own associates organising his death. On 23 April 2010, Dunne was shot dead at a birthday party in Cabra, in front of his seventeen-year-old daughter.

== Early life ==
The son of Eamon and Margaret Dunne, Eamon Dunne was born on 17 February 1976, and grew up in Cabra. Unlike many of his criminal contemporaries, he came from a stable family background and completed his Leaving Certificate examinations, attending St Declan's College in Cabra West. Prior to becoming a criminal, he first worked in meat wholesale, later becoming a taxi driver. He ran a motor business, which he used as a front for his criminal activities.

Dunne was believed by Gardaí to have had a long history of violence against women, including assaulting his girlfriend, who had made a complaint to Gardaí about it but withdrew it in fear. According to crime journalist Paul Williams in his 2011 book Badfellas, Dunne had frequent affairs with girlfriends and wives of his own associates and other gangland criminals. Gardaí had repeatedly found Viagra tablets in his BMW car when he had been stopped for searches.

== Criminal activities ==
A member of Martin "Marlo" Hyland's crime gang, Dunne was one of Hyland's closest lieutenants. By the late 1990's Hyland's gang was one of the most powerful organised crime groups in North Dublin. Hyland was the leader of a large gang of drug dealers and armed robbers who lived in Cabra, Finglas and Ballymun areas. The gang were involved in the importation and distribution of large shipments of cannabis, cocaine, ecstasy and heroin as well as VAT fraud, car theft, armed robbery, extortion and the supply of firearms. Between 2002 and 2004, Hyland's gang was involved in a spate of robberies of security vans delivering money to ATM bank machines in the Greater Dublin area. In a ten-month period alone, between October 2003 to July 2004, the gang robbed an estimated €3 million at gunpoint.

Dunne first came to Garda attention in 2002 after being caught at a house during a raid with a large quantity of cocaine and ecstasy; at the time of his death, he was due to stand trial for this in the Supreme Court. Several months later, Dunne was stopped while driving a car and a man was found bound and gagged in the boot; the kidnap victim never filed a complaint and Dunne faced no punishment for this.

Following Operation Oak, a large number of seizures were made against Hyland's gang, and a number of Hyland's associates, including ones awaiting payment for carrying out murders he had ordered, were facing serious charges. As Hyland's empire began to crumble, Dunne made a move to kill his former boss. In December 2006, Hyland was shot dead at the home of a relative in Finglas, along with innocent plumber Anthony Campbell; it is suspected that Dunne drove the getaway car for the killers. Following Hyland's murder, Dunne quickly filled the power vacuum and took control of the drug trade in Dublin.

Dunne forged links with a number of other criminal groups, including the Kinahan Organised Crime Group, "Fat" Freddie Thompson's criminal gang in Dublin and the McCarthy-Dundon gang in Limerick, the latter of whom his former boss Hyland had organised the murder of Latvian woman Baiba Saulite for in 2007; Dunne was alleged to have been involved in this murder. Through his connections with Declan Duffy, he had links to the INLA; during a 2007 raid by the Special Detective Unit on a house in Tallaght, Duffy and Dunne were found torturing a drug dealer, though no complaint was forthcoming and they were not charged as a result. Dunne had reportedly also been a protegé of Dublin criminal godfather and drug trafficker Eamon Kelly.

Up until his death, newspapers were not able to name Dunne in their reports for legal reasons, instead dubbing him "The Don". Dunne sent several unsuccessful legal letters to newspapers, claiming that their reports placed his life in jeopardy. He was reported to have engaged in intimidation, arriving to court hearings accompanied by two henchmen and frequently threatening press photographers.

== Celbridge attempted armed robbery ==
Increased Garda surveillance on Dunne's gang resulted in the authorities becoming aware of a plot to rob at gunpoint a cash-in-transit vehicle making deliveries. In September 2007, Gardaí placed wiretaps on several of the gang's telephones and put others under 24 hour surveillance. In early November 2007, Dunne was part of a seven man team arrested by armed Emergency Response Unit officers outside the Celbridge branch of Tesco supermarket, after two gang members had attempted to cut their way into an unmarked Chubb Ireland Nissan Patrol jeep with €900,000 in cash onboard using a concrete saw. Dunne was charged with conspiracy to rob and remanded in custody to await trial, however in January 2008 he was released on bail after the High Court ruled his detention was unlawful on a legal technicality.

At the time of his death, Dunne was on bail and awaiting trial in connection with the attempted robbery. The Irish Independent reported that he was expected to face a number of criminal charges under gangland legislation should he not have been murdered. The other members of the gang were brought before the courts however, and all received custodial sentences for their involvement:

- Joseph Warren, who claimed to have been acting under duress from Dunne when he tried to cut open the doors of the jeep with a consaw, was found guilty of conspiracy to rob and was sentenced to 14 years in prison
- Alan "Fat Puss" Bradley, who authorities accused of being the second-in-command of the gang, pleaded guilty to conspiracy to rob and was sentenced to 9 years imprisonment
- his younger brother Wayne Bradley, who acted as a look out, also pled guilty to conspiracy to rob and was sentenced to 7 years in prison
- Jeffrey Morrow pleaded guilty to conspiracy to rob and was sentenced to 6 years imprisonment
- Michael "Chino" Ryan pleaded guilty to conspiracy to rob and was sentenced to 5 years imprisonment
- Darryl Caffrey, who was a Chubb Ireland employee that passed on insider information to the gang regarding delivery times and unmarked delivery vehicle registration numbers in return for a 10% cut of the robbery proceeds, pleaded guilty to participating in organised crime and was sentenced to 3 years in prison

== Alleged murder victims ==
Despite never being charged nor convicted of murder, Dunne was noted for his extreme propensity for gangland killings, including of his own associates. While usually not pulling the trigger himself, Dunne was suspected of being involved in at least a dozen organized crime related deaths in the years before his own assassination.

Dunne's victims allegedly included:

- Andrew "Chicore" Dillon (26), a drug dealer from Finglas, shot dead on 17 August 2005. Formerly a member of the Westies crime gang, Dillon had stolen from a drug-trafficker ally of Hyland. On Hyland's orders, Dunne and two other gangsters lured Dillon into a trap, before shooting him three times and dumping his body in a ditch.
- Baiba Saulite (26), shot dead outside her home on 19 November 2006. Saulite was shot dead on the orders of John Dundon of the McCarthy-Dundon crime family, who was sharing a cell with Saulite's ex-husband, Lebanese crime boss Hassan Hassan. According to crime journalist Paul Williams, Hyland recruited Dunne, gangland killer Paddy Doyle and three other members to murder Saulite.
- Martin "Marlo" Hyland (37), the original leader of the gang Dunne was a member of, shot dead in Finglas on 12 December 2006.
- Anthony Campbell (20), an innocent plumber, shot dead during the assassination of Hyland.
- John Daly (27), shot dead as he sat in a taxi in Finglas on 22 October 2007. Daly had been released from prison in August of that year, after serving a nine-year sentence for armed robbery. A former member of Marlo Hyland's gang, he reportedly demanded money that Hyland owed him from Dunne; after threatening to kill Dunne, he was shot dead.
- Trevor Walsh (33), shot dead at Kippure Park, Finglas, two days after he was released from prison, on 20 July 2008.
- Paul 'Farmer' Martin (39), a convicted armed robber, shot dead in the Jolly Toper pub in Finglas on 23 August 2008. An ally of both Hyland and Daly, Martin had reportedly refused to stop selling drugs in Dunne's territory.
- Michael 'Roly' Cronin (35), a major drug dealer, and James Maloney (26), his driver, shot dead in Dublin city centre, January 2009. A former associate of Hyland, Dunne had conspired with Cronin to have Hyland killed after Cronin incurred a drug debt to Hyland. A feud between the two later erupted. In 2008, Cronin attempted to attack Dunne with a grenade, but was spotted by Garda surveillance. Dunne hired heroin addict Christy Gilroy, who had bought drugs off Cronin previously, to lure him into a trap; Gilroy shot both men twice.
- Graham McNally (34), shot dead in Finglas, 20 January 2009. One of Dunne's closest allies, McNally was killed because Dunne believed he was plotting against him. Dunne himself was believed to have been the gunman in this murder.
- Christopher "Christy" Gilroy (36), disappeared in Spain, February 2009. A heroin addict hired to kill Michael "Roly" Cronin and James Maloney, he had left the murder weapon and clothing linking him to the murder close to the crime scene. Gilroy fled to Spain, where Dunne paid for him to enter a detox clinic. Paranoid about Gilroy potentially becoming a Garda informer, Dunne hired hitman Eric "Lucky" Wilson to kill Gilroy and ensure the body was never found.
- Michael Murray (41), shot dead in Finglas, 2 March 2009. Having accepted a contract from associates of John Daly to kill Dunne, Murray had survived a murder attempt in 2008 after Dunne ordered Gilroy to kill him; Murray survived after being shot in the shoulder. He was shot three times in the head on a second attempt, in a killing ordered by Dunne.
- Paul Smyth (34), from Finglas, body found in Balbriggan, 12 June 2009. A former member of Hyland's gang and the brother-in-law of Paul "Farmer" Martin, he had been approached by associates of both Martin and John Daly to kill Dunne.
- David Thomas (43), shot dead outside the Drake Inn pub in Finglas, 11 October 2009. Not involved in serious crime, Thomas has been acquitted of killing a man in a pub in 2001; Dunne was believed to have organised the murder for a friend.
- John Paul Joyce (30), a drug trafficker, body found near Dublin Airport on 9 January 2010. The man tasked with disposing of the weapon used to kill Paul "Farmer" Martin, Joyce had instead given it to the police in the hope of a lighter sentence for an assault charge. After Dunne discovered this, he had Joyce shot in the head.

== Downfall and death ==
For several years, Dunne had suffered from anxiety and paranoia; it was reported that in 2001 he had expressed suicidal thoughts to his GP, and two years later he was reportedly drinking eight cans of alcohol a night; at the time of his death, he had reportedly been using over five grams of cocaine a day. Dunne was also reportedly in financial difficulty before his death, having walked onto a halting site the weekend before his murder and demanded €20,000 from two men. Dunne also demanded €150,000 from a major gangland criminal, threatening to have the INLA kill him if he did not pay.

Dunne's increasing paranoia and unstable behaviour eventually led to his own gang members turning against him. Due to the increased Garda attention brought on by Dunne's repeated murders, Gardaí believe crime boss Christy Kinahan, who supplied Dunne's gang with drugs, conspired with Dunne's former mentor Eamon Kelly to have him killed. Together with some of Dunne's closest associates they are suspected of organising his murder and of hiring a gang of young criminals from the north inner city to actually carry out the hit.

Thirty-four-year-old Dunne was murdered as he attended a friend's birthday party at a pub in Cabra on 23 April 2010. A hit team of four men arrived in a car, and one of them waved his gun around, warning smokers outside the pub to disperse. He then guarded the front door. Two masked gunmen entered and began shooting at Dunne several times. He unsuccessfully attempted to use a lounge boy as a human shield before the first gunman shot Dunne twice in the chest & once in the head, with the second gunman also performing the "Mozambique drill" on him as he lay on the ground. The gunmen escaped in a waiting car. His bodyguard and a number of close associates were present, though none made any attempt to prevent the murder, as was his seventeen-year-old daughter.

Dunne's death was widely celebrated; the mother of plumber Anthony Campbell, who was murdered during the assassination of Martin Hyland that Dunne organised, said he was now "drinking with the devil", while Cormac Byrne of the Irish Independent described him as a "vicious and nasty paranoid coke-fuelled mess". Senior Gardaí reported he was the "worst we've ever seen in terms of body counts". No one has been ever been convicted for Dunne's murder; speaking to the Irish Times, a Garda source reported that "the list of suspects [would] be very very long". Dunne had already organised his own funeral in 2009, and had picked out a grave in Dardistown Cemetery. He is buried head-to-head with Paddy Doyle, a former gangland criminal who was ambushed and killed in Spain in 2007; the pair had known each other since childhood.

In 2020, the High Court ruled that insurance company Irish Life did not have to pay out on an insurance policy taken out by Dunne. Legal action had been taken against Irish Life by Dunne's ex-partner Georgina Saunders, but the court found that Dunne's heavy cocaine usage had not been disclosed to the company.

== See also ==
- List of unsolved murders (2000–present)
