= Psychic (disambiguation) =

A psychic is someone who claims to possess paranormal or supernatural capabilities.

Psychic qualities are those relating to the psyche (the mind or soul).

Psychic or The Psychic may also refer to:

== Movies ==
- Psychic, a 1991 film with Zach Galligan
- Psychic, a 2018 short directed by Irish actor Brendan Gleeson
- Sette note in nero, a 1977 Italian film released in the US as The Psychic

== Episodes ==
- "The Psychic", a 1967 episode from the first season of Mission: Impossible
- "The Psychic", a 1977 episode from the second season of Starsky & Hutch
- "The Psychic", a 1980 episode from the third season of The Incredible Hulk (1978 TV series)
- "The Psychic", a 1981 episode from the seventh season of Barney Miller
- "The Psychic", a 1985 episode from the fifth season of Cagney & Lacey
- "The Psychic", a two-part 1986 episode from the third season of Amen
- "The Psychic", a 1990 episode from the fifth season of Street Legal

== Other uses ==
- Psychic (album), a 2013 album by Darkside
- "Psychic", a 2006 song by Vanessa Hudgens from her debut album V
- Psychic (song), a 2022 song by Chris Brown from his album Breezy
- The Psychic (play), a 2026 psychological thriller play by Jeremy Dyson and Andy Nyman

== See also ==
- Psych (disambiguation)
- Psyche (disambiguation)
- Psycho (disambiguation)
- Psychedelic (disambiguation)
- Physic (disambiguation)
- Physics (disambiguation)
