= Lietuvos TSR mokslų akademijos darbai =

Lietuvos TSR mokslų akademijos darbai (transl. Works of the Academy of Sciences of the Lithuanian SSR) was an academic journal published by the presidium of the Academy of Sciences of the Lithuanian SSR from 1955 to 1989 in Vilnius. The journal was divided into three series – Serija A (social sciences), Serija B (chemistry), and Serija C (biology). At the end of 1989, the journal was reorganized into eight specialized journals.

== History ==
In November 1953, the presidium of the Academy of Sciences decided to discontinue the irregularly published journal Lietuvos TSR mokslų akademijos žinynas which mainly published documents from the academy's meetings and articles on the activities of the academy. It was replaced by Lietuvos TSR mokslų akademijos darbai divided into Serija A and B. The first issues were published in 1955. In April 1956, the journal was recognized as an academic journal in the entire Soviet Union – it was the only Lithuanian journal with such recognition until 1968.

In 1960, the additional Serija C was published. At the time, the journal's editorial committee was chaired by Juozas Matulis (chairman of the academy). The journal's responsible editor was Vladas Petrauskas. Each series had its own editorial teams chaired by historian Juozas Žiugžda for Serija A, physicist Adolfas Jucys for Serija B, and physician Vladas Lašas for Serija C.

The journal published research articles, reviews of new books and other publications, and articles on the activities of the academy and its institutes. As more specialized journals began to be published, the series narrowed down their scope. For example, they stopped publishing articles on mathematics, physics, or agricultural matters. The journal was annotated in international bibliographical publications. Some articles were translated to foreign languages.

== Series ==
Series of Lietuvos TSR mokslų akademijos darbai
Series	Topics	Issues per year	Total issues	Circulation (1989)
Serija A	Social sciences	4	109	910
Serija B	Chemistry, technology, geography	6	175	700
Serija C	Biology	4	108	670

== See also ==
- Lietuvos TSR aukštųjų mokyklų mokslo darbai

== Bibliography ==
- Liekis, Algimantas (2001). Lietuvos mokslų akademija, 1941–1990. Lietuvos mokslas (in Lithuanian). Vol. 31. Lietuvos mokslas. ISBN 9986-795-10-9.
- Tapinas, Laimonas; et al., eds. (1997). "Lietuvos TSR mokslų akademijos darbai" (PDF). Žurnalistikos enciklopedija (in Lithuanian). Vilnius: Pradai. ISBN 9986-776-62-7.
- "„Lietuvos TSR mokslų akademijos darbai"". Visuotinė lietuvių enciklopedija (in Lithuanian). Mokslo ir enciklopedijų leidybos centras. 26 June 2019 [2008].
