= Dessie O'Hare =

Irish republican paramilitary (born 1956)

- Born: 26 October 1956 (age 69); Keady, County Armagh, Northern Ireland
- Military career
- Paramilitaries: Provisional IRA (c. 1972/73 – c. 1978); Irish National Liberation Army (c. 1978–1987; 1998–unknown); Irish Revolutionary Brigade (c. 1987)
- Nickname: The Border Fox
- Unit: South Armagh Brigade (Provisional IRA)
- Conflicts: The Troubles

Dessie O'Hare (born 26 October 1956), also known as "The Border Fox", is an Irish republican paramilitary who was once the most wanted man in Ireland.

O'Hare was originally in the Provisional Irish Republican Army (Provisional IRA) but left in the late 1970s following a series of disciplinary clashes. He later joined the Irish National Liberation Army (INLA). After kidnapping a Dublin dentist and cutting off two of his fingers in 1987 he was imprisoned until 2006, when he was granted extended temporary release.

== Early life ==
O'Hare was born in Keady, County Armagh, Northern Ireland, into a family with a strong republican background. His grandmother was imprisoned for six months in Holloway Gaol for "keeping republicans", and his father and six of his uncles were interned between 1940 and 1944.

== IRA activities ==
O'Hare joined the South Armagh Brigade of the Provisional IRA at the age of 16, and was part of a unit that targeted members of the Royal Ulster Constabulary (RUC) and Ulster Defence Regiment (UDR). His colleagues nicknamed him "The Border Fox" following his escape from a number of shootouts with the Garda Síochána and the RUC. In 1975, he was convicted for the first time for possession of explosives, and received a suspended sentence. On 8 October 1977, O'Hare and his unit killed Margaret Ann Hearst, a female part-time member of the UDR, in front of her three-year-old daughter, in Tynan, County Armagh. Her father, Ross Hearst, was killed three years later. The RUC and Gardaí linked O'Hare to a series of killings and attacks, including the attempted killing of Ulster Unionist Party politician Jim Nicholson. He left the Provisional IRA in the late 1970s and joined the Irish National Liberation Army.

== Arrest and first prison sentence ==
In August 1978 O'Hare was arrested following the attempted murder of a British Army officer, who was shot at his wedding reception in County Meath. In 1979 O'Hare was shot twice, and the Gardaí arrested him after a car chase through County Monaghan. The chase ended when O'Hare crashed his car through a herd of cattle and into a farmer's car, before coming to rest in a field. He broke both ankles in the crash; his companion in the car, Anthony McClelland, died. At his trial in 1980 he was sentenced to nine years imprisonment for possession of a firearm; he was released in 1986.

== INLA feud ==
Upon his release, O'Hare found that the INLA had split and was engaged in a feud with the Irish People's Liberation Organisation (IPLO). The IPLO assassinated INLA leaders Ta Power and John O'Reilly and in revenge, O'Hare is accused of the killing of Tony McCloskey, an IPLO associate who had allegedly tipped them off as to O'Reilly and Power's whereabouts. McCloskey was abducted from his home in County Monaghan on 6 February 1987. He was tortured with his ear and finger being cut off with a bolt cutter before he was shot dead and his body dumped in a rural part of the same county. O'Hare is alleged to have been behind the abduction and killing. Six INLA members were killed in the feud with the IPLO.

== Kidnapping and second imprisonment ==
Such was the disarray of the INLA after this internecine feuding that O'Hare broke away from the remaining INLA leadership in Belfast and set up his own group, the Irish Revolutionary Brigade, which operated in the border region out of Castleblayney. It was described as having "a handful" of members.

In 1987 O'Hare and three other INLA members kidnapped John O'Grady, a dentist from Dublin, and demanded a IR£1.5m ransom. The gang had intended to seize Austin Darragh, owner of the Institute of Clinical Pharmacology, but Darragh had moved three years previously from the house, which was occupied by O'Grady, his son-in-law. He was initially imprisoned in a Dublin basement before being moved to Cork, where he was imprisoned in a cargo container. Gardaí happened on the site, but O'Hare and his gang escaped after opening fire on the Irish police and getting away by hijacking a car. The car was later found burnt out in Dundalk, but O'Hare had moved O'Grady to a house in Cabra, North Dublin. After ransom demands were not met O'Hare cut off the little finger from each of O'Grady's hands with a hammer and chisel and sent them to Carlow Cathedral. In a telephone call to the Gardaí O'Hare stated:

It's just cost John two of his fingers. Now I'm going to chop him into bits and pieces and send fresh lumps of him every fucking day if I don't get my money fast.

Garda detectives traced the gang to the Cabra house and a shootout ensued. A Garda detective was seriously wounded and O'Grady was rescued but O'Hare and his gang escaped. O'Hare became the most wanted man in Ireland with the Gardaí offering a IR£100,000 reward for information on his whereabouts. He surfaced in Dunleer, County Louth, where he allegedly fired shots into a takeaway during an altercation with his wife. Two of the gang were arrested near Cahir, County Tipperary. Three weeks later on 27 November O'Hare was arrested after his car drove through an Irish Defence Forces check point in Urlingford, County Kilkenny. O'Hare was shot eight times during the arrest which was effected after a fire-fight, and the driver of the car, Martin Bryan, was killed. An Irish Army soldier was wounded in the affray.

At his trial at the Special Criminal Court, O'Hare was convicted of false imprisonment, wounding with intent and possession of firearms, and received a 40-year sentence. After receiving his sentence, he made a speech in which he called for support for the Irish Revolutionary Brigade and called for republicans to turn their guns on the Irish judiciary, Prison service, Defence Forces and Gardaí. He concluded by declaring,"May all my deeds reverberate until bloody war is waged against the British and their southern allies”.

He was sent to the maximum security Portlaoise Prison, where he was isolated by former Provisional IRA and INLA associates who accused him of bringing republicanism into disrepute. In December 1987, the INLA's political wing, the Irish Republican Socialist Party (IRSP), issued a statement disassociating themselves from the kidnapping and stating that O'Hare "is not a member of the INLA". In the early 1990s, he undertook a vow of silence and did not speak for six years. He also staged a dirty protest and re-joined the INLA wing of the prison in 1998, following the Good Friday Agreement. By 2001 he had become commander of the INLA inmates held there.

== Attempts at securing release ==
In 2000 O'Hare requested a judicial review, stating that he should have been released under the terms of the 1998 Good Friday Agreement. On 6 April 2001 the High Court reserved judgement on the case pending information from the Department of Justice. On 8 December 2002, O'Hare was transferred to Castlerea Prison in preparation for his release, and a week later issued a statement that "[his] war was over". The IRSP mounted a campaign for his release, stating, "Dessie's "crime", if 'crime' it was, was to be an active Republican."

O'Hare was first granted temporary release from prison in November 2003 when he attended a weekend long course on conflict resolution in Glencree, and he was granted further periods of temporary release in November 2004 and March 2005. In November 2005 he was returned to Portlaoise Prison after he was caught with a mobile phone and a bag of pills when returning to Castlerea from temporary release, which jeopardised his chance of release on licence.

O'Hare launched a new High Court bid for being let out of prison in April 2006, and was granted extended temporary release. He returned to Northern Ireland, and was believed to be living in Newtownhamilton in South Armagh. The Police Service of Northern Ireland (PSNI) issued a statement that O'Hare will not be arrested on suspicion of involvement in up to 30 unsolved killings as the alleged offences predate the Good Friday Agreement. However, investigations have not been ruled out by the Historical Enquiries Team, which has been assigned to probe all unsolved killings during the Troubles.

== Post-paramilitary Crime ==
In December 2006 drug-dealer Martin "Marlo" Hyland was shot dead at his Dublin home, along with a plumber called Anthony Campbell who was working there. Irish Taoiseach Bertie Ahern stated in the Dáil Éireann that a "significant former paramilitary" had been in the company of Hyland during the summer. The Irish Independent reported that this referred to O'Hare. O'Hare's spokesman, Eddie McGarrigle of the IRSP denied O'Hare had any involvement with the murders stating that he was working with handicapped people and a charity, and had been an assistant to a group of pilgrims on a trip to Lourdes. McGarrigle's statement was supported by the Gardaí, who said there was no evidence to link O'Hare to the murders.

In December 2012, O'Hare served as one of the pall bearers and chief mourners at the funeral of Eamon Kelly, a leading Dublin crime boss murdered by the Real IRA in revenge for the September 2012 killing of its leader Alan Ryan. O'Hare was reputed to have been a drinking buddy of Kelly, whom he had befriended when both were serving time in Portlaoise Prison.

In 2019 he was sentenced to seven years in prison for assaulting John Roche, at The Towers, Garter Lane in Saggart, County Dublin on 9 June 2015. He also pleaded guilty to falsely imprisoning Martin Byrne at Rathcoole and Saggart on the same date. It is believed that he was employed by Dublin businessman Jim Mansfield Jr to evict an employee and his family from his home. Another person involved in the false imprisonment case was Declan 'Whacker' Duffy.

== Beliefs ==
In 1987 O'Hare told a journalist he was only interested in "the bomb and the bullet" and did not believe in politics, and confessed to murdering 27 people, Garda and prison officers describe him as a psychotic killer who can be charming and manipulative, and say he is an exceptional risk. During his time in Portlaoise Prison, O'Hare became a student of anthropology, psychology, metaphysics, yoga and tai chi, stating that he had found a "divine force" and gained with "this esoteric knowledge, a newer and better understanding of everything. Some fellow prisoners – and even a few jailers – have remarked that I've changed."

In a 2001 interview, he stated that he had no regrets about his paramilitary career. He said of the O'Grady kidnapping:

"It was a fundraising operation that failed. I haven't taken it personal [sic] what happened to me as a result of it, and I hope that those on the other side haven't taken it personal what happened to them. In fact, John was a totally innocent victim in that operation and I think he understood that too." ... "Anyone who questions the legitimacy of a just war obviously isn't a true soldier and has no place in a revolutionary army", he says. He has described himself as a republican socialist and cited influence from Marxism and Christianity, justifying his actions as "War brings circumstances with it that changes our normal concepts of morality. It's a tough, dirty business, caused in the first instance by the filth of corruption."
