= Regius Professor of Physic =

Regius Professor of Physic may refer to:

- Regius Professor of Physic (Cambridge), a professorship at the University of Cambridge
- Regius Professor of Physic (Dublin), a professorship at the University of Dublin, Trinity College
- Regius Professor of Medicine (Oxford) (formerly the Regius Professor of Physic), a professorship at the University of Oxford

== See also ==
- Regius Professor of Medicine (disambiguation)
