= Haunted London =

Haunted London (1973) was the fourth published book by Peter Underwood, 'an indefatigable ghost-hunter', who had first published a survey of Britain's haunted sites - Gazetteer of British Ghosts (1971). As had been the case with the broader territory covered in the Gazetteer, '[t]here had previously been no comprehensive survey of London's ghost population'; 'the publicity it received - including posters on London's underground and buses - resulted in good sales'.

Peter's son Christopher was responsible for all the photographs that illustrate the book, and as was the case with those he took for the Gazetteer, they were taken especially, and form a visual journey of their own. Underwood felt that 'he really captured something of the atmosphere and variety of London's haunted houses'. Furthermore, as far as Underwood was concerned, Haunted London was 'the cause not only of several other books but also guided tours of London, illustrated lectures, personal investigations and even a film'.

James Clark repeatedly cites Underwood's book in his own Haunted London (2007). Underwood's Haunted London is also referred to in David Brandon's Haunted London Underground (2009), Richard Estep's In Search of the Paranormal (2015), whilst Richard Jones' Walking Haunted London (2009) and Haunted London (2009) both follow a similar pattern established by Underwood, individual dividing the coverage of stories and reporting of supposed paranormal activity into the same areas of London as Underwood (which Jones also does similarly in his Haunted Britain and Ireland (2001) in relation to Underwood's 1971 Gazetteer of British Ghosts and Gazetteer of Scottish & Irish Ghosts); although Jones does not make any acknowledgement or sign of debt to Underwood as the basis for the form and structure of his books, he does cite other work by Underwood in his bibliography. Simpson and Westwood make references to Underwood's Haunted London in The Penguin Book of Ghosts (2008) and The Lore of the Land (2006).

Underwood would subsequently lament one entry in the book; one that concerned 'the appearance of the Vicar of Radcliffe Wharf' (included in the section covering the 'Isle of Dogs'). Underwood's source material was a ghost story that had been written by Frank Smyth and published in Man, Myth & Magic, (part 105). Smyth's story gave the reader 'every impression of having happened', citing people who also claimed to have seen the ghost. However, in a confession published in The Sunday Times, Smyth admitted to having made up the story.

What particularly vexed Underwood was that, in their publication of the confession, The Sunday Times also cited the following line from Underwood's book: 'the appearance of the Vicar of Ratcliff Wharf is convincing and puzzling', whilst omitting the following words that precede it: 'If we accept the evidence of the four men'. Underwood's efforts to contact the paper regarding being quoted out of context failed.

Haunted London was reprinted in paperback form by Fontana books in 1975, and in a revised form in 2010, by Amberley Publishing.
