= Psy (disambiguation) =

Psy (full name: Park Jae-sang; born 1977) is a South Korean singer best known for his hit single "Gangnam Style".

Psy, or PSY may also refer to:

- Psy (film), a 1992 film directed by Władysław Pasikowski
- Psychedelic trance, or simply psy, a form of electronic music
- Psy, rapper in the Canadian group, the Oddities
- Simon "Psy" Kaina, character in the manga and anime Heroman
- ISO 639-3 code for the Piscataway language, an extinct Native American language
- The IATA airport code for Port Stanley Airport at Port Stanley in the Falkland Islands
- P.S.Y., a French band known for their song "Angelina"
- Phytoene synthase, an enzyme involved in the synthesis of phytoene

== See also ==
- Psi (disambiguation)
- Psych (disambiguation)
- Psyche (disambiguation)
- Psycho (disambiguation)
- Psychedelic (disambiguation)
