= Psyche =

Psyche is the Ancient Greek term (ψυχή) for 'soul'.

Psyche may also refer to:

== Psychology ==
- Psyche (psychology), the totality of the human mind, conscious and unconscious
- Psyche, an 1846 book about the unconscious by Carl Gustav Carus
- Psyche, an 1890–1894 book about the ancient Greek concept of soul by Erwin Rohde
- Psyche (consciousness journal), a periodical on the study of consciousness
- Psyche, a digital magazine on psychology published by Aeon
- Psyche Cattell, (1893–1989), American psychologist

== Religion and mythology ==
- Psyche (mythology), a mythological figure whose story and marriage to Cupid is known from Apuleius' book The Golden Ass
- Soul in the Bible, spirit or soul in Judaic and Christian philosophy and theology

== Arts and media ==
=== Based on Cupid and Psyche ===
- The story of Cupid and Psyche, mainly known from the Latin novel by Apuleius, and depicted in many forms:
  - Cupid and Psyche (Capitoline Museums), a Roman statue
  - Marlborough gem, a 1st-century carved cameo
  - Landscape with Psyche Outside the Palace of Cupid, a 1664 painting by Claude Lorrain, National Gallery London
  - Psyché (play), a 1671 tragedy-ballet by Molière
  - Psyche (Locke), a semi-opera of 1675 with music by Matthew Locke
  - Psyché (opera), a 1678 opera with music by Jean-Baptiste Lully
  - A 1714 violin sonata by Italian composer Michele Mascitti
  - Psyche Revived by Cupid's Kiss a sculpture of 1793 by Antonio Canova
  - Psyche, a six-canto allegorical poem by Mary Tighe first published in 1805
  - Cupid and Psyche (Thorvaldsen), a sculpture of 1808, Copenhagen
  - Love and Psyche (David), a painting of 1817, now in Cleveland
  - Eros and Psyche (Robert Bridges), poem of 1885
  - An 1888 symphonic poem by Belgian composer César Franck
  - An 1898 fairy tale by Louis Couperus
  - Psyche (painting), a 1902 painting by Solomon Joseph Solomon

=== Music ===
- Psyché (Falla), a 1924 classical music composition by Manuel de Falla
- Psyche (band), a Canadian dark synthpop music group (formed 1982)
- Psyche (album), a 1994 album by PJ & Duncan
- A 2009 electronica song by Massive Attack on Splitting the Atom
- "Psyche-Out", a 1963 instrumental by The Original Surfaris
- The Psyche, a 1975 album by Revolutionary Ensemble

=== Other media ===
- A 1972 fictive anthology by Sándor Weöres
- Danielle Moonstar, a character in the Marvel Comics universe
- "Psyche" (Duckman), a 1994 episode of Duckman
- Psyche, a character from Unico

== Science and technology ==
=== Biology ===
- Psyche (entomology journal), a periodical on entomology
- Psyche (moth), a genus of moths in the bagworm family (Psychidae)
- Leptosia nina, or Psyche, a species of butterfly

=== Other uses in science and technology ===
- 16 Psyche, an asteroid
- Psyche (Red Hat Linux), code name for v8.0 (2002)

== Vessels ==
- Psyche (spacecraft), a NASA orbiter of the metallic asteroid 16 Psyche
- HMS Psyche, one of various British naval ships
- USS Psyche V (SP-9), a United States patrol vessel
- French ship Psyché, various ships of the French Navy

== See also ==
- Psy (disambiguation)
- Psych (disambiguation)
- Psycho (disambiguation)
- Psychic (disambiguation)
- Psychedelic (disambiguation)
- Soul (disambiguation)
