= Peter Underwood (parapsychologist) =

British parapsychologist (1923–2014)

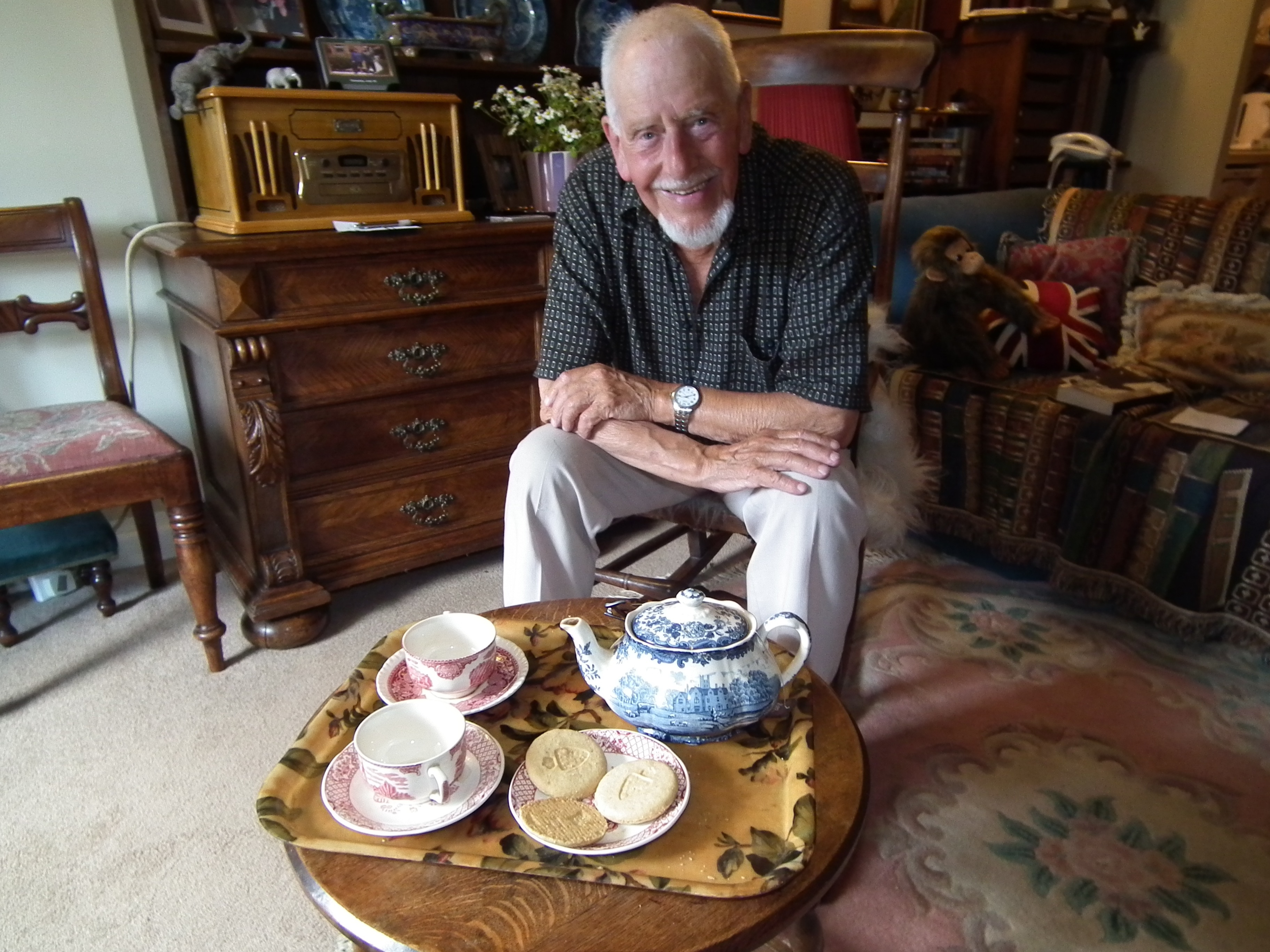
- Underwood in 2014
- Born: 16 May 1923; Letchworth Garden City, England
- Died: 26 November 2014 (aged 91); Haslemere, Surrey, England
- Occupations: Ghost-hunter, and author
- Children: 2
- Writing career
- Genre: Paranormal
- Subjects: Ghosts, Folklore, History
- Notable works: Gazetteer of British Ghosts (1971); Haunted London (1973); Nights in Haunted Houses (1994); Dictionary of the Supernatural (1978)
- Website: peterunderwood.org

Signature
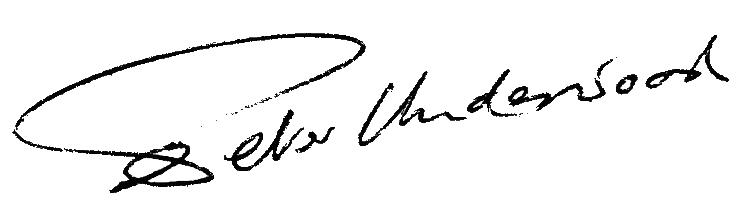

Peter Underwood FRSA (16 May 1923 – 26 November 2014) was an English author, broadcaster and parapsychologist. Underwood was born in Letchworth, Hertfordshire. Described as "an indefatigable ghost hunter", he wrote many books which surveyed alleged hauntings within the United Kingdom - beginning the trend of comprehensive regional 'guides' to (purportedly) haunted places. One of his well-known investigations concerned Borley Rectory, which he also wrote about.

== Early life ==
Born into a family who were Plymouth Brethren, Underwood had his first paranormal experience at the age of nine, when he claimed to have seen an apparition of his father, who had died earlier the same day, standing at the bottom of his bed. During his childhood, his maternal grandparents lived for a time at Rosehall, a seventeenth century Hertfordshire house which it was claimed was haunted, supposedly having a bedroom in which guests claimed to have seen the figure of a headless man. Underwood's interest in hauntings and psychic matters began to take root at that time.

At the beginning of the Second World War, Underwood joined the publishing firm of J.M. Dent & Sons in Letchworth Garden City. In January 1942 he was called up for active service with the Suffolk Regiment. After collapsing at a rifle range at Bury St Edmunds, Underwood was diagnosed with a serious chest ailment which rendered him unfit for active service. He was discharged from the army and returned to Dents. On 15 July 1944, Underwood married at St. Mary's Church in nearby Baldock (his wife, Joyce, died in 2003 after having suffered with Parkinson's disease for 14 years).

Underwood was much influenced by the work of Harry Price - the grandfather of ghost-hunting - and was particularly struck by Price's ‘The End of Borley Rectory’, which he read immediately when it was first published in 1946. Investigating Borley himself, he corresponded with Price about it. Price then invited Underwood to join the Ghost Club, of which he would later become president.

== Investigating the paranormal ==
During his investigations into the Borley Rectory case, over a period of years, Underwood traced and personally interviewed almost every living person who had been connected with what the press had dubbed the 'most haunted house in England'. He built up a volume of correspondence with paranormal investigator Harry Price and after Price's death, Paul Tabori would become literary executor of the Harry Price Estate, with whom Underwood worked to publish all his research into Borley. Price had written and published two books about Borley, The Most Haunted House in England (1940), and The End of Borley Rectory (1946), from which Underwood 'compile[d] a really comprehensive index of the combined volumes'.

Underwood's published work changed the field of literature on the paranormal. For example, his much imitated Gazetteer of British Ghosts (1971) and Haunted London (1973) - previously unheard of comprehensive and well-researched surveys (or geographical dictionaries or gazetteers) - which, through their encyclopaedic thoroughness, imparted authority to Underwood as an author on the subject of ghost hunting to which he dedicated his life. They also encouraged others to use them as resources to use to visit for themselves the sites he investigated. Underwood came to be known as a 'veteran psychical researcher ... representing the middle-ground between scepticism and uncritical belief'; the 'Sherlock Holmes of psychical research' - as Dame Jean Conan Doyle would say (when introducing him).

In their book Ghosts of Borley (1973), Underwood and Paul Tabori wrote that they believed "some of the phenomena were genuine" at the Borley Rectory. The researcher Trevor H. Hall criticized Tabori and Underwood for selective reporting. According to Hall, the alleged paranormal phenomena from the rectory were the result of natural causes, such as noises produced by rats or flying bats, pranks by local village boys throwing stones at the house, or tramps trying to keep warm by lighting small fires in the rectory.

In his book No Common Task: The Autobiography of a Ghost-Hunter (1983), Underwood came to the conclusion after years of investigation that 98% of the reports of ghosts and hauntings are likely to have naturalistic explanations such as misidentification, hallucination or pranks and he was most interested in the 2% of the phenomena that he believed may be genuine.

Underwood was a long-standing member of the Society for Psychical Research. For some years Underwood was the Honorary Librarian of the Constitutional Club and the Savage Club, where he was a former Member of the Qualifications Committee. In 1976 a bust of Underwood was sculpted by Patricia Finch, winner of the gold medal for Sculpture in Venice (it currently resides with the Savage Club).

In 2018 a website was published by his grandson Adam Underwood chronicling his life and work.

== Ghost Club Society ==
Having been invited to join the Ghost Club by Harry Price, Underwood was its president from 1960 to 1993. In 1994, Underwood formed the Ghost Club Society after his departure from the Ghost Club. Membership to the Ghost Club Society was by invitation only. It was reported that the group had several hundred members. Quarterly newsletters were published to members and regular meetings held around the United Kingdom.

== Recognition ==
In recognition of his more than seventy years of paranormal investigations - Dame Jean Conan Doyle described him as 'The Sherlock Holmes of Psychical Research' - Underwood accepted the invitation to be the Patron of The Ghost Research Foundation (founded in Oxford in 1992), which termed him the King of Ghost Hunters. In 2000 Underwood was contacted by Clark R. Schmidt, Doctor of Esoteric Sciences from Celestial Visions School of Metaphysical Arts in Fort Lauderdale, Florida (founded in 1994) to become a lifelong member of the Universal Parapsychological and Metaphysical Association (founded in 1996), which he accepted. Shortly before his death he accepted an invitation to be the Patron of Paranormal Site Investigators (UK).

== Bibliography ==
- Gazetteer of British Ghosts (1971)
- Gazetteer of Scottish & Irish Ghosts (1973)
- Into the Occult (1972)
- A Host of Hauntings (1973)
- Haunted London (1973)
- Ghosts of Borley (1973)
- Deeper into the Occult (1975)
- The Vampire's Bedside Companion: The Amazing World of Vampires in Fact and Fiction (1975)
- Lives to Remember (1975)
- Dictionary of the Supernatural (1978)
- Dictionary of Occult and the Supernatural (1979)
- Ghosts of North-West England (1978)
- Ghosts of Wales (1978)
- Hauntings: New Light on Famous Cases (1977)
- A Ghost Hunters Handbook (1980)
- Complete Book of Dowsing & Divining (1980)
- Ghosts of Devon (1982)
- Ghosts of Cornwall (1983)
- Ghosts of Somerset (1999)
- Ghosts of Hampshire & The Isle of Wight (1982)
- Ghosts of Kent (1984)
- This Haunted Isle (1984)
- The Ghost Hunters: Who they are and what they do (1985)
- Queen Victoria's Other World (1986)
- The Ghost Hunter's Guide (1986)
- West Country Hauntings (1988)
- Mysterious Places (1988)
- Ghosts of Dorset (1988)
- Jack the Ripper - 100 years of mystery (1987)
- Horror Man - Boris Karloff (1972)
- Life's a Drag: Danny La Rue (1974)
- No Common Task: Autobiography of a Ghost Hunter (1983)
- Thirteen Famous Ghost Stories (1977)
- Ghosts of Wiltshire (1989)
- Ghostly Encounters (1992)
- Ghosts & Phantoms of the West (1993)
- Exorcism! (1990)
- A-Z of British Ghosts (1992)
- Death in Hollywood (1992)
- Ghosts & How to See Them (1993)
- Nights in Haunted Houses (1994)
- The Ghost Hunter's Almanac (1993)
- Guide to Ghosts and Haunted Places (1996)
- Ghosts of North Devon (1999)
- Favourite Tales of the Fantastical (2000)
- Borley Postscript (2001)
- The Murder Club (2004)
- The Borley Rectory Companion (2008)
- Haunted Gardens (2009)
- The Ghost Club - A History (2010)
- Shadows in the Nave (2011)
- Irish Ghosts (2012)
- Where the Ghosts Walk (2013)
- Haunted Farnham (2013)
- Ghost Hunting with Peter Underwood (2014)
