= Psychotronics =

Psychotronics or psychotronic may refer to:

- Psychotronics (parapsychology), the study of paranormal and psychic phenomena
- Psychotronic torture, alleged mind control by electronic and electromagnetic means
- Psychotronic movie, a low-budget film genre

== See also ==
- Psion (disambiguation)
- The Psychotronic Man, a 1980 American science fiction film
- Psychotronic Video, an American film magazine
