= Physic =

Physic may refer to:

- The study or practice of medicine
- A substance administered as medicine, or the medicinal plant from which it is extracted:
  - Gillenia stipulata, a plant known commonly as Indian physic
  - Jatropha, a genus of plants commonly known as the physic nut
  - Veronicastrum virginicum, a plant known commonly as Culver's physic
- Physic garden, a type of herb garden with medicinal plants

== See also ==
- Physics (disambiguation)
- Regius Professor of Physic (disambiguation)
- Regius Professor of Medicine (disambiguation)
