= Psi (Cyrillic) =

Cyrillic letter

- Ѱ ѱ

Usage
- Writing system: Cyrillic
- Type: Alphabetic
- Sound values: /ps/

History
- Development: Ψ ψ: Ѱ ѱ

Other
- Associated numbers: 700 (Cyrillic numerals)

Psi (Ѱ, ѱ; italics: Ѱ ѱ) is a letter in the early Cyrillic alphabet, derived from the Greek letter of the same name (Ψ ψ). It represents the sound /ps/, as in English naps, in words like ѱаломъ (psalomŭ, 'psalm'). According to the school rules developed in the 16th and the 17th centuries, such as Meletius Smotrytsky's grammar book, it was intended for use in words of Greek origin, but it was occasionally used for writing native words as well like Russian ѱы (psy, 'dogs'). It was used especially in words relating to the Eastern Orthodox Church, as can be seen in its continuing use in Church Slavonic.

Psi was eliminated from the Russian orthography, along with ksi, omega, and the yuses, in the Civil Script of 1708 (Peter the Great's Grazhdansky Shrift), and it has also been dropped from other secular languages. It continues to be used in Church Slavonic.

== Computing codes ==
Character information
| Preview | Ѱ | | ѱ | |
|---|---|---|---|---|
| Unicode name | CYRILLIC CAPITAL LETTER PSI | | CYRILLIC SMALL LETTER PSI | |
| Encodings | decimal | hex | dec | hex |
| Unicode | 1136 | U+0470 | 1137 | U+0471 |
| UTF-8 | 209 176 | D1 B0 | 209 177 | D1 B1 |
| Numeric character reference | &#1136; | &#x470; | &#1137; | &#x471; |

== See also ==
- Psi (disambiguation), for other meanings.
