= Martin "Marlo" Hyland =

Irish criminal and gang boss

- Born: Martin Oliver Hyland; 1 September 1969; Cabra, Dublin, Ireland
- Died: 12 December 2006 (aged 37); Finglas, Dublin, Ireland
- Cause of death: Shot dead by associates
- Resting place: Glasnevin Cemetery
- Years active: 1980s – 2006
- Organizations: P.J. Judge gang (1990s–1996); Hyland gang (1996–2006)
- Criminal charges: Conspiracy to commit robbery; Burglary; Malicious damage; Car theft

Martin Oliver "Marlo" Hyland (1 September 1969 – 12 December 2006) was an Irish criminal and gang boss. Originally from Cabra, Hyland became involved in crime as part of the gang of Finglas drugs trafficker PJ Judge. After Judge's murder in 1996, which Hyland was suspected to have been involved in, he filled the power vacuum and became the main figure in organised crime in North Dublin. His gang, spread across Cabra, Finglas and Ballymun, were involved in importing drugs, tax fraud, stealing cars, armed robberies and supplying guns to other gangs, and Hyland was suspected to have been involved in at least five murders throughout his life.

Hyland's reign began to come to an end as a Garda operation successfully interrupted several shipments of drugs and seized the gang's possessions, fuelling dissent within the gang. On 12 December 2006, Hyland was shot dead at a relative's home in Finglas, along with innocent plumber Anthony Campbell, who had been working at the house. Eamon Dunne, a close lieutenant of Hyland who was believed to have driven the getaway car during the murder, took over the gang after Hyland's death.

== Early life ==
Martin Oliver Hyland was born to a working-class family from Saint Attracta Road in Cabra, Dublin. The son of William and Ellen Hyland, he was the fifth of seven children. As a teenager he led a gang of young criminals from Cabra, involved in burglary, car theft and robbery. In 1986, eighteen-year-old Hyland was sent to prison for various offences including conspiracy to commit robbery, burglary, malicious damage and car theft.

In 1985, Hyland's sister Julie was raped and strangled to death by her husband Michael Brady. Having served a jail sentence after being convicted, Brady was shot dead 18 months after his release in 1996; though no one was ever convicted of the murder, Hyland was suspected by Gardaí to have been involved in organising it.

== Rise to prominence ==
After his release from serving a short prison sentence in the early 1990s, Hyland became involved in drug dealing. He moved into the big league of crime when he became associated with PJ Judge, a major drugs trafficker and gang leader from Finglas. Hyland's sister, Ellen, was the girlfriend of Judge.

Judge was shot dead outside the Royal Oak pub in Finglas in December 1996. Gardaí originally suspected he was killed by Provisional IRA because of his erratic and violent nature, though a 2007 Sunday World article alleged that Hyland had Judge murdered after he incurred a debt of £130,000 to Judge following a drug seizure. In his 2011 book Badfellas, crime journalist Paul Williams wrote that following Judge's murder of William "Jock" Corbally, there was increased Garda attention on the area, disrupting criminal activity by the IRA locally. Judge and Hyland had both paid off the IRA to ensure their safety. Members of the IRA, who had controlled the Concerned Parents Against Drugs group in the area, had met with Hyland and encouraged him to kill Judge, as both Hyland and the IRA saw him as a liability.

By 2000, Hyland had become the dominant figure in organised crime in North Dublin. He controlled a large gang of drug dealers and armed robbers from Cabra, Finglas and Ballymun. The gang were involved in the importation of large shipments of cannabis, cocaine, ecstasy and heroin as well as VAT fraud, car theft, armed robbery, extortion and the supply of firearms. Between 2002 and 2004 his gang was involved in a spate of robberies of security vans delivering money to ATM bank machines in Dublin. In a ten-month period alone, between October 2003 to July 2004, they got away with an estimated €3 million.

Hyland's reign was characterised by his networking with other gangs and establishment of strong links with other gangs across the country, including the McCarthy-Dundons in Limerick, to whom he supplied guns during their feud. Hyland also supplied guns to the "Fat" Freddie Thompson faction of the Crumlin-Drimnagh feud, and provided the IRA with guns and getaway cars. Hyland reasoned that with increased Garda attention on Crumlin and Drimnagh, there would be less attention paid to his own activities.

Hyland's gang were suspected to be involved in the November 2001 murder of Gerard "Concrete" Fitzgerald, who had ordered the murder of his own nephew Francis, a member of Hyland's gang, in 2000. Another victim was Andrew "Chicore" Dillon, a 26-year old drug dealer from Finglas who had been a member of the Westies crime gang. Dillon had stolen from Finglas drug trafficker John "The Mexican" McKeown, an ally of Hyland's, before fleeing the country for the UK. After Dillon returned to Ireland, Hyland welcomed him, but three months later he tasked his lieutenant Eamon Dunne to kill Dillon; on 17 August, Dunne and two other gangsters lured Dillon into a trap, before shooting him three times and dumping his body in a ditch.

== Downfall ==
This criminal activity meant that Hyland and his associates became prime targets of the Gardai. In September 2005, Gardaí decided to adapt a full on multi agency tactical approach to stop his gang. The plan, involving Gardaí and customs, was codenamed Operation Oak. The operation was a huge success and within the first few months it had led to the seizure of 30 kilos of heroin, 35 kilos of cocaine and 1,427 kilos of cannabis. A number of stolen vehicles, €200,000 in cash and weapons including AK47s were also recovered. These seizures left Hyland scrambling to attempt to pay his suppliers abroad.

After the success of the seizures, Hyland began to suspect his former associate, Paddy Harte, was acting as an informant. After Hyland convinced two of his closest lieutenants that Harte was informing Gardaí, Harte was shot dead on 29 May 2006 after dropping his children to school. However, the murder did not stop Gardaí's progress with the operation. In August of that same year, Louth drug dealer Paul Reay was shot dead in a murder organised by Hyland's gang, as they feared he was a Garda informer.

Twenty four of Hyland's associates were facing serious charges, which led to resentment and bad feeling within the gang. As Gardaí pressure increased, Hyland became more isolated as gang members blamed him for all the attention. Further pressure grew on Hyland after the murder of Baiba Saulite, a 26 year old Latvian woman, which Hyland had organised for John Dundon from the McCarthy-Dundon gang. When another crime boss, whose gun had been used in this murder, found out about the victim, he was reportedly furious at Hyland and said he would have not provided the weapon if he knew the victim was.

Under immense pressure, Hyland began to take large amounts of cocaine, as his gang began to crumble around him and his former criminal associates began to distance themselves from him. The final straw came when Hyland was unable to pay heroin dealer Michael "Roly" Cronin for a drug shipment; one of Hyland's henchmen attempted to kill Cronin but he escaped uninjured. Hyland's former lieutenant, Eamon Dunne, decided Hyland was a liability and had to be killed. He approached the men who had killed Paddy Harte, still awaiting a €50,000 payment for the murder and facing long jail sentences for serious drug charges, and convinced them to assist him with murdering Hyland. In November 2006 and again on 7 December, Hyland was warned by Gardaí, as is protocol, that his life was in danger.

== Death ==
On the night of 11 December 2006, Hyland, who had access to several properties and never stayed at the same place two nights in a row, stayed at the home of his niece in Scribblestown Park, Finglas. Just before 9am the next morning, after his niece had left to take her daughter to school, two gunmen entered the house. Hyland was sleeping in a bedroom upstairs while 20-year-old Anthony Campbell, an apprentice plumber who had called to the house earlier to work on a faulty radiator, was downstairs. One of the gunmen held Anthony Campbell downstairs while the other crept up the stairs and shot Hyland twice in the head and four times in the back as he slept. Before they left they also shot the innocent Campbell once in the head, killing him instantly. The murder of Campbell, uninvolved in crime, prompted outrage from the Irish public.

After a funeral with only a small handful of mourners, Hyland was buried in Glasnevin Cemetery.

Despite Gardaí suspecting the killers were two of Hyland's most trusted lieutenants, and arresting Dunne and a number of his gang members, no one has been convicted of the double murder. Dunne, believed to have driven the getaway car during the murder, effectively took control of the gang soon after. Dunne was linked to over a dozen gangland murders over the next three years before he himself was shot dead at a pub in Cabra in April 2010.
