= Reciprocal Fibonacci constant =

Mathematical constant

The reciprocal Fibonacci constant ψ is the sum of the reciprocals of the Fibonacci numbers:

$$\psi = \sum_{k=1}^{\infty} \frac{1}{F_k} = \frac{1}{1} +  \frac{1}{1} + \frac{1}{2} + \frac{1}{3} + \frac{1}{5} + \frac{1}{8} + \frac{1}{13} + \frac{1}{21} + \cdots.$$

Because the ratio of successive terms tends to the reciprocal of the golden ratio, which is less than 1, the ratio test shows that the sum converges.

The value of ψ is approximately

$$\psi = 3.359885666243177553172011302918927179688905133732\dots$$
(sequence A079586 in the OEIS).

With k terms, the series gives O(k) digits of accuracy. Bill Gosper derived an accelerated series which provides O(k^{2}) digits. ψ is irrational, as was conjectured by Paul Erdős, Ronald Graham, and Leonard Carlitz, and proved in 1989 by Richard André-Jeannin.

Its simple continued fraction representation is:

$$\psi = [3;2,1,3,1,1,13,2,3,3,2,1,1,6,3,2,4,362,2,4,8,6,30,50,1,6,3,3,2,7,2,3,1,3,2, \dots] \!\,$$
(sequence A079587 in the OEIS).

== Generalization and related constants ==
In analogy to the Riemann zeta function, define the Fibonacci zeta function as
$$\zeta_F(s) = \sum_{n=1}^\infty \frac{1}{(F_n)^s} = \frac{1}{1^s} + \frac{1}{1^s} + \frac{1}{2^s} + \frac{1}{3^s} + \frac{1}{5^s} + \frac{1}{8^s} + \cdots$$
for complex number s with Re(s) > 0, and its analytic continuation elsewhere. Particularly the given function equals ψ when s = 1.

It was shown that:

- The value of ζ_{F}(2s) is transcendental for any positive integer s, which is similar to the case of even-index Riemann zeta-constants ζ (2s).
- The constants ζ_{F}(2), ζ_{F}(4) and ζ_{F}(6) are algebraically independent.
- Except for ζ_{F}(1) which was proved to be irrational, the number-theoretic properties of ζ_{F}(2s + 1) (whenever s is a non-negative integer) are mostly unknown.

== See also ==
- List of sums of reciprocals
- List of mathematical constants
