= Paranormal Site Investigators =

Paranormal Site Investigators (PSI)
- Company type: Charity
- Founded: 2004
- Headquarters: United Kingdom

United Kingdom charity Paranormal Site Investigators (PSI) is dedicated to advancing education, research and heritage in the area of anomalous experience. The charity has a membership of around 1400. The charity patron is Peter Underwood.

PSI publishes the Journal of Investigative Psychical Research free to subscribers since 2005; the journal is kept by the library of the Society for Psychical Research and the British Library. The organisation has also contributed to various books, publications and academic journals. PSI contributors have included Dr Andrew Nichols and Peter Underwood. The charity published Haunted Swindon: A Census of Hauntings in 2008. Paranormal Site Investigators also runs education classes through Further Education colleges. PSI has conducted a number of fieldwork investigations of which a small number have been televised on BBC1, ITV1, Channel4 and the Discovery Channel, and some have been reported retrospectively by the media including The Times and others. PSI also seem to be regularly linked by the BBC, and have their own suite of pages on the BBC site

== Charitable activities ==
Paranormal Site Investigators states its objects are to: Advance education of the public in the subject of anomalous experience through work with schools and colleges, Universities, training, lectures and work with others. Advance science through scientific research into the subject by conducting formal research and fieldwork, working with other agencies, and publishing the results freely through this website and the PSI Journal. Advance education through culture and heritage. PSI is also affiliated to national education charity the Association for the Scientific Study of Anomalous Phenomena.

== National Lottery funding ==
To date Paranormal Site Investigators has received three grants from the UK National Lottery, which allocates money to good causes.

In 2008 a grant was awarded to provide free access to heritage in the Swindon Haunted Heritage Project. In 2009 a further grant was awarded to provide education materials to school and college A-Level classes, and to the community. Also in 2009 a grant was awarded with the aim of providing free heritage and research events.
