= Professional Skills Institute =

American technical school

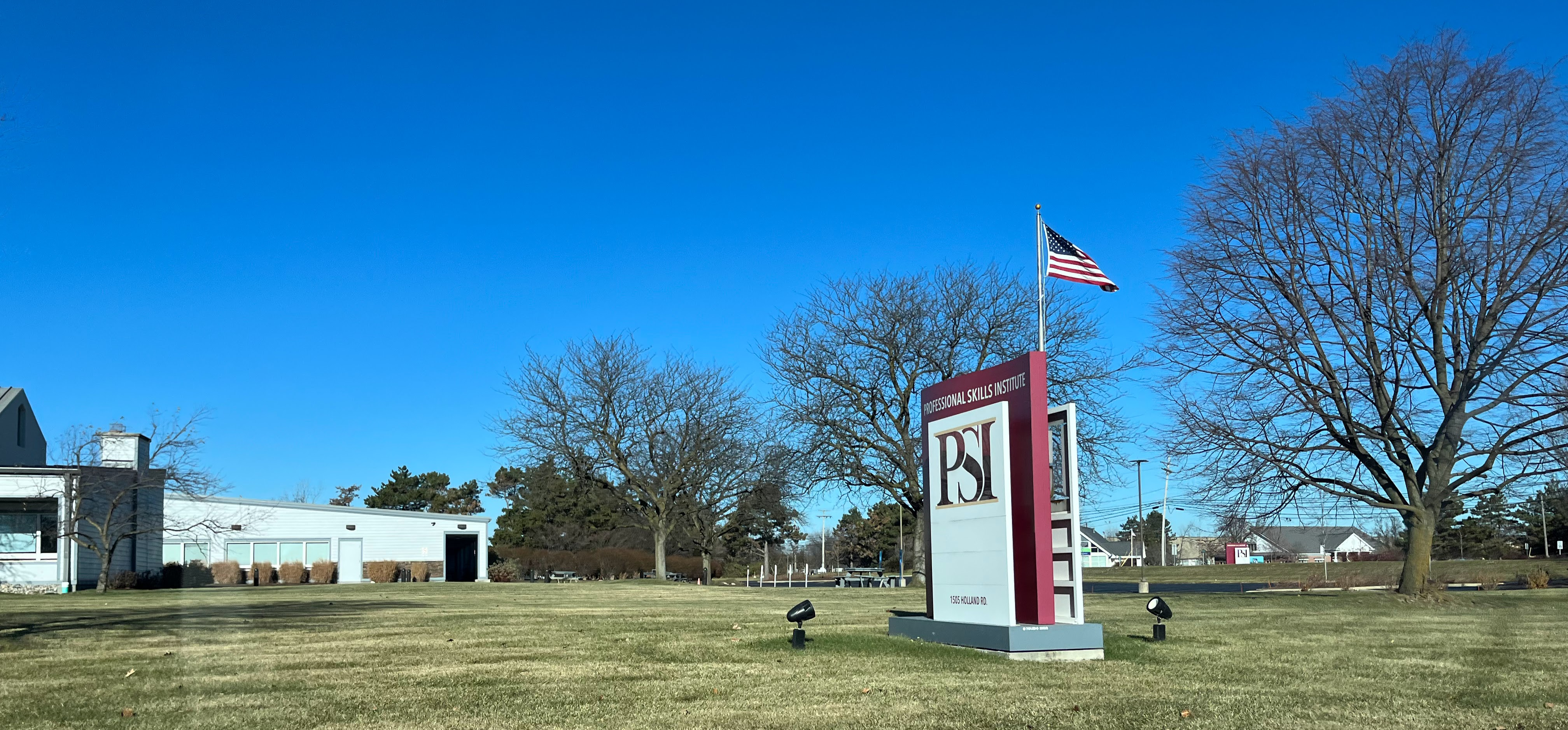
- Campus in Maumee, Ohio
- Motto: "Career Education for a Lifetime of Success"
- Type: Private
- Established: 1984
- Administrative staff: 47
- Undergraduates: 245
- Location: Maumee, Ohio, United States; 41°35′02″N 83°40′21″W
- Campus: Very small, Urban
- Executive director: Daniel A. Finch
- Nickname: PSI
- Website: ProSkills.edu

Professional Skills Institute (PSI) is a private for-profit technical school in Maumee, Ohio, US. PSI specializes in training for allied health professions and offers associate degree and diploma programs.

== History ==
In 1984, a registered nurse named Patricia Finch founded PSI. The classes were originally taught in an office space along Airport Highway, as there were only 2 students taking part in 2 programs. Currently, PSI is located on Holland Road and has 300 enrolled students.
