= Leibniz Institute for Psychology Information =

German research organization

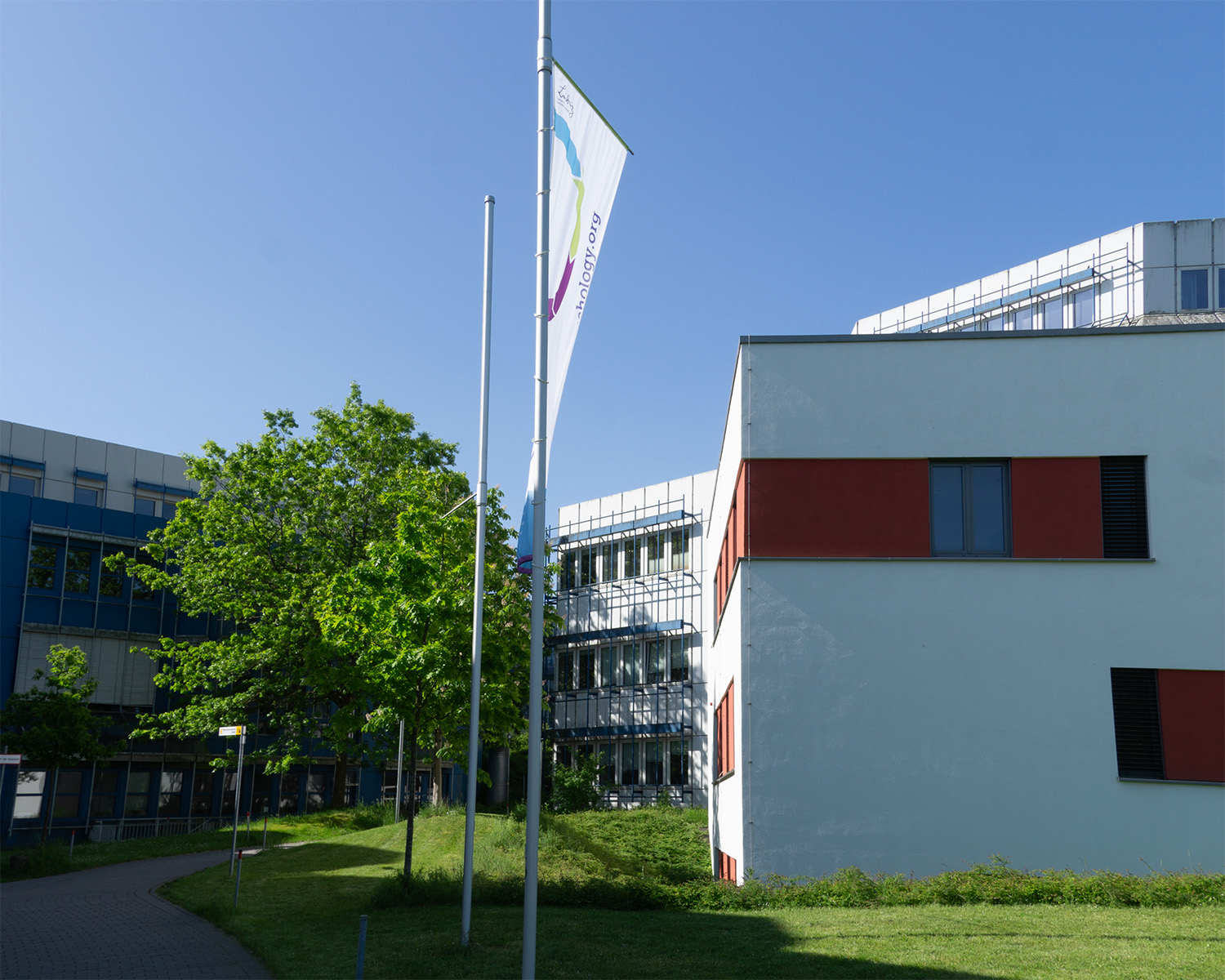
The Leibniz-Institute for Psychologie (ZPID) ist located at the Trier University.

The Leibniz Institute for Psychology (ZPID) is a research support organization located in Trier, Germany. It is the supraregional research support facility for psychology in German-speaking countries, covering the full scientific work process, including literature research and study planning, data collection, analyses to documentation, archiving and publication of results. ZPID belongs to the Leibniz Association.

== Directors ==
The directors of the institute have been:

- 1972 – 1979: Günther Reinert
- 1979 – 2003: Leo Montada
- 2004 – 2017: Günter Krampen
- July 2017 – December 2021: Michael Bosnjak
- January 2022 – September 2023: Claudia Dalbert
- from October 2023: Kai Sassenberg

== Products and services ==
- Information search (Search portal accessing several reference databases PubPsych)
- Database (Publication references PSYNDEX)
- Preregistration (Platform RegReports)
- Archiving (discipline-specific psychology repository PsychArchives, psychometric test respository OpenTestArchive)
- Publication (Publishing platform PsychOpen)
