= Psi (Greek) =

Penultimate letter in the Greek alphabet

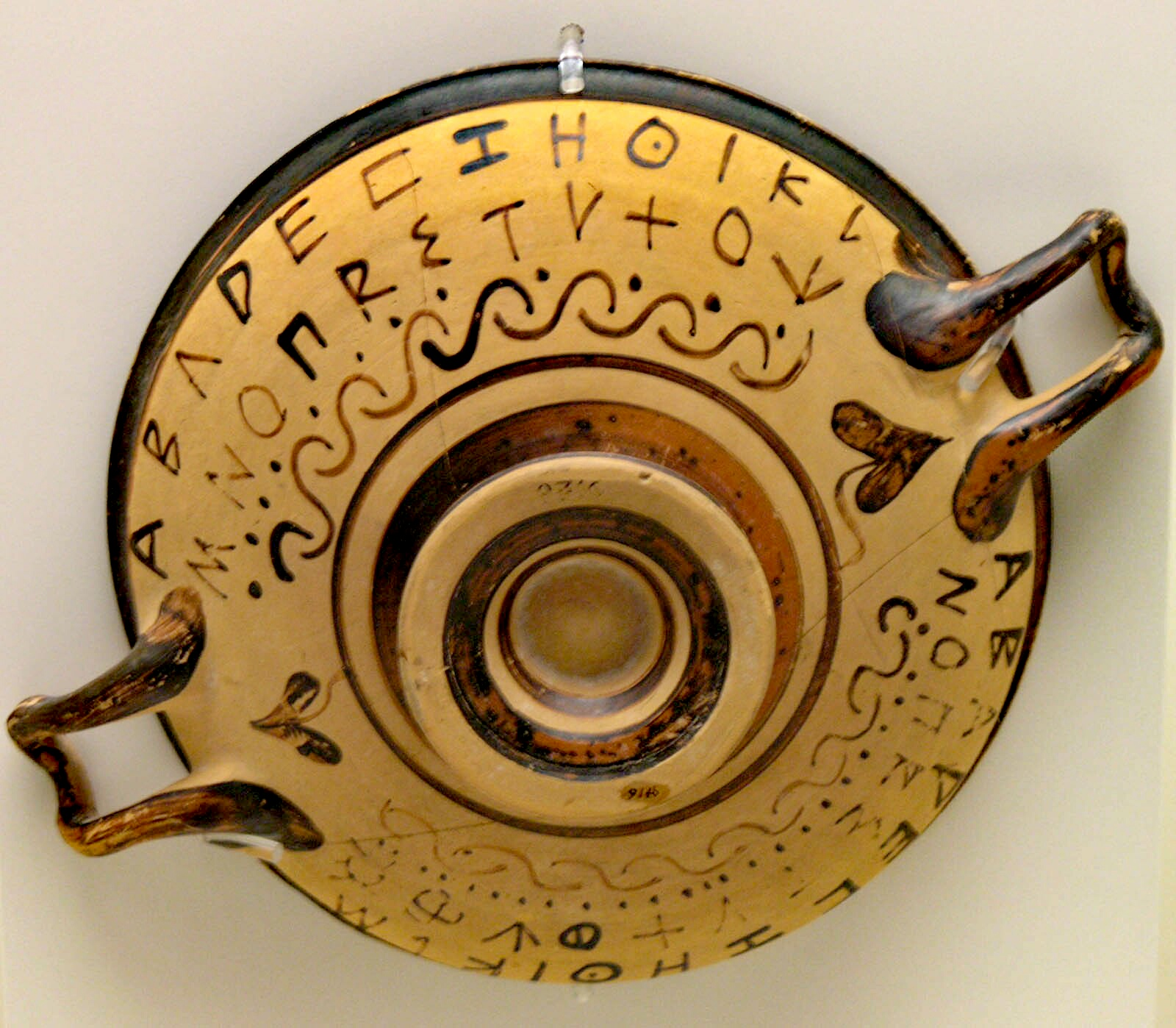
The Greek alphabet on a black-figure pottery vessel, with an archaic chickenfoot-shaped psi.

Psi /ˈ(p)saɪ, ˈ(p)siː/ (P)SY, (P)SEE (uppercase Ψ, lowercase ψ or 𝛙; Greek: ψι psi [ˈpsi]) is the twenty-third and penultimate letter of the Greek alphabet and is associated with a numeric value of 700. In both Classical and Modern Greek, the letter indicates the combination /ps/ (as in English word "lapse").

For Greek loanwords in Latin and modern languages with Latin alphabets, psi is usually transliterated as "ps".

The letter's origin is uncertain. It may or may not derive from the Phoenician alphabet. It appears in the 7th century BC, expressing /ps/ in the Eastern alphabets, but /kʰ/ in the Western alphabets (the sound expressed by Χ in the Eastern alphabets). In writing, the early letter appears in an angular shape. There were early graphical variants that omitted the stem ("chickenfoot-shaped psi" as: or).

The Western letter (expressing /kʰ/, later /x/) was adopted into the Old Italic alphabets, and its shape is also continued into the Algiz rune ⟨ᛉ⟩ of the Elder Futhark.

Psi, or its Arcadian variant or was adopted in the Latin alphabet in the form of "Antisigma" (Ↄ, ↃC, or 𐌟) during the reign of Emperor Claudius as one of the three Claudian letters. However, it was abandoned after his death.

The classical Greek letter was adopted into the early Cyrillic alphabet as "Ѱ".

== Use as a symbol ==
The symbol Ψ or ψ has many uses across different academic and informal contexts:

- Wave functions in quantum mechanics
- The generalized positional states of a qubit in a quantum computer
- The polygamma function
- The fields of psychology, psychiatry, and sometimes parapsychology
- The reciprocal Fibonacci constant, the division polynomials, and the supergolden ratio
- The second Chebyshev function
- Water potential in movement of water between plant cells
- In biochemistry, it denotes pseudouridine, an uncommon nucleoside
- A stream function in fluid mechanics
- One of the dihedral angles in the backbones of proteins
- Indiana University (as a superimposed I and U)
- A sai, whose name is pronounced the same way in English
- Pharmacology, general pharmacy
- The retroviral psi packaging element
- The J/psi meson in particle physics
- The return value of a program in computability theory
- The phase relationship between a zeitgeber and a biological rhythm
- In building, to represent an adjustment to a U-value, accounting for thermal bridge effects
- The ordinal collapsing function and notation
- In Biblical studies, as an abbreviation for the book of Psalms
- Codex Athous Lavrensis

== Unicode ==
- U+03A8 Ψ GREEK CAPITAL LETTER PSI (&Psi;)
- U+03C8 ψ GREEK SMALL LETTER PSI (&psi;)
- U+0470 Ѱ CYRILLIC CAPITAL LETTER PSI
- U+0471 ѱ CYRILLIC SMALL LETTER PSI
- U+1D2A ᴪ GREEK LETTER SMALL CAPITAL PSI
- U+2CAE Ⲯ COPTIC CAPITAL LETTER PSI
- U+2CAF ⲯ COPTIC SMALL LETTER PSI
- U+1D6BF 𝚿 MATHEMATICAL BOLD CAPITAL PSI (Note: The mathematical characters are used in math. Stylized Greek text should be encoded using the normal Greek letters, with markup and formatting to indicate text style.)
- U+1D6D9 𝛙 MATHEMATICAL BOLD SMALL PSI
- U+1D6F9 𝛹 MATHEMATICAL ITALIC CAPITAL PSI
- U+1D713 𝜓 MATHEMATICAL ITALIC SMALL PSI
- U+1D733 𝜳 MATHEMATICAL BOLD ITALIC CAPITAL PSI
- U+1D74D 𝝍 MATHEMATICAL BOLD ITALIC SMALL PSI
- U+1D76D 𝝭 MATHEMATICAL SANS-SERIF BOLD CAPITAL PSI
- U+1D787 𝞇 MATHEMATICAL SANS-SERIF BOLD SMALL PSI
- U+1D7A7 𝞧 MATHEMATICAL SANS-SERIF BOLD ITALIC CAPITAL PSI
- U+1D7C1 𝟁 MATHEMATICAL SANS-SERIF BOLD ITALIC SMALL PSI

== See also ==
- Psi and phi type figurine
- Psi (Cyrillic)
