= French ship Psyché =

Eight ships of the French Navy have borne the name Psyché or La Psyché:

- Psyché (1762), a 3-gun gunboat, deleted from Navy lists in 1764.
- Psyché (1766), a frigate, never completed
- French frigate Psyché (1804), a 36-gun frigate, captured by HMS St Fiorenzo in 1805 and taken into service as HMS Psyche. She was broken up in 1812.
- French frigate Psyché (1812), a 44-gun frigate
- Psyché (1837), a 40-gun frigate, launched but never completed
- French frigate Psyché (1844), a 40-gun frigate
- French submarine La Psyché (Q174) (1932), a Diane-class submarine
- French submarine Psyché (S650) (1967), a Daphné-class submarine

== Sources and references ==
- Roche, Jean-Michel (2005). Dictionnaire des bâtiments de la flotte de guerre française de Colbert à nos jours 1 1671 - 1870. p. 367. ISBN 978-2-9525917-0-6. OCLC 165892922.
- Les bâtiments ayant porté le nom de Psyché, netmarine.net
