= PubPsych =

Retrieval system for psychological resources

PubPsych is a vertical open access information retrieval system for psychological resources, coordinated by the research support organization Leibniz Institute for Psychology Information (ZPID). The search interface is available in English, Spanish, French, and German. PubPsych includes over 800.000 datasets and offers, where available, full-text linking, links to additional information and link resolving.

== Cooperation Partners ==
PubPsych is a joint project of cooperating organizations within Europe and the United States of America. Participating organizations are:

- Leibniz Institute for Psychology Information (ZPID), Germany,
- Institut de l'Information Scientifique et Technique (INIST-CNRS), France,
- Consejo Superior de Investigaciones Científicas (CSIC), Spain,
- National Academic Research and Collaborations Information System (NARCIS), Netherlands,
- National Library of Norway (NB), Norway,
- U.S. National Library of Medicine (NLM), US,
- Education Resources Information Center (ERIC), US.

== Mission ==
PubPsych offers free access to an expanding range of international databases including records not covered in commercial international databases.

== Data Pool ==
PubPsych indexes databases either fully or just Psychology relevant segments. The data pool consists of the following:

Fully indexing:

- PSYNDEX (Germany)
- PsychOpen (Germany)
- PsychData (Germany)
- ISOC-Psicología (Spain)

Indexing of Psychology relevant segments:

- PASCAL (France)
- NARCIS (Netherlands)
- NORART (Norway)
- MEDLINE® (USA)
- ERIC (USA)

== Update frequency ==
According to own statements of the coordinating institute ZPID, the update frequency depends on the database, in average 6000 data records are getting added per month:

- PsychOpen, PsychData (immediately after the release of new records)
- PSYNDEX, MEDLINE (weekly)
- ERIC, PASCAL, NARCIS (monthly)
- ISOC-Psicología, NORART (quarterly)

== See also ==
- List of academic databases and search engines
