= Psychedelic (disambiguation) =

A psychedelic is a term primarily indicating the involvement of a psychoactive drug that alters cognition and perception, is translated from the Latin to English as "mind-manifesting". Psychedelics (also known as hallucinogens) are now considered a broad pharmacological class of psychoactive substances that produce changes in perception, mood and cognitive processes.

Psychedelics, being a subclass of hallucinogenic drugs whose primary effect is to trigger non-ordinary mental states (known as psychedelic experiences or "trips") and a perceived "expansion of consciousness". Also referred to as classic serotonergic hallucinogens The term psychedelic is sometimes used more broadly to include various other types of experiences, eras (e.g., Psychedelic renaissance), styles of art, literature, mathematical forms of geometry, hallucinations, religious experiences, or meditative visualizations.

Psychedelic may also refer to:

== Psychology and healthcare ==
- Psychedelic experience, a temporary altered state of consciousness induced by the consumption of psychedelics
- Psychedelic therapy, therapeutic practices involving the use of psychedelics, primarily to assist psychotherapy
- Hallucinogen, an umbrella classification for any subclass of drugs which cause psychedelic experiences, for example entactogens, deliriants, dissociatives, nicotinamides, and many others.

== Culture and society ==
- Psychedelia, a subculture surrounding the psychedelic experience
- Psychedelic era, a time of social and cultural change related to psychedelia between the early 1960s and the mid-1970s

== Arts, entertainment, and media ==
- Psychedelic art, art inspired by the psychedelic experience
- Psychedelic film, a film genre influenced by psychedelia
- Psychedelic literature, literature related to psychedelics
- Psychedelic music, popular music connected to psychedelia, aiming to replicate or enhance the psychedelic experience
  - Psychedelic folk, originating in the mid-1960s
  - Psychedelic funk, originating in the late 1960s
  - Psychedelic pop, originating in the mid-1960s
  - Psychedelic rock, originating in the mid-1960s
  - Psychedelic soul, originating in the late 1960s
  - Psychedelic trance (also known as psytrance or simply psy), originating in the late 1990s
- Psychedelia (film), a 2015 film
- Psychedelic Porn Crumpets, a band

== Other uses ==
- Psychedelic frogfish, named for its appearance

== See also ==
- Psychotropic
- Shagadelic
- Psy (disambiguation)
- Psych (disambiguation)
- Psyche (disambiguation)
- Psycho (disambiguation)
