= Physics (disambiguation) =

Physics is a natural science that studies matter and the forces that act upon it.

Physics may also refer to:

== Journals and magazines ==
- Physics (American Physical Society journal), former name of the Journal of Applied Physics, published by the American Physical Society
- Physics (Chinese Physical Society journal), or Wuli, published by the Chinese Physical Society
- Physics (magazine), published by the American Physical Society
- Physics (MDPI journal), published by MDPI
- Physics Physique Физика, a small journal that ran from 1964 to 1968 published by Physics Publishing, often simply referred to as Physics

== Other uses ==
- Physics (Aristotle), a key text in the philosophy of Aristotle
- Physics (band), an American rock music group
- The Physics (group), an American hip hop group
- Aristotelian physics, the natural science described in the works of Aristotle
- Theoretical physics
- PhysX, a physics engine for computer games made by Nvidia

== See also ==
- Physic (disambiguation)
- Psychic (disambiguation)
