= Psychological (song) =

Single by The Band Perry
- Released: February 17, 2026
- Studio: Blackbird Studio
- Genre: Country
- Length: 3:16
- Label: Nashville Harbor
- Songwriters: Clara Park; Grace Tyler; Colton Venner
- Producer: Dan Huff

The Band Perry singles chronology
"Nite Swim" (2019)	"Psychological" (2026)

Music video
- "Psychological" on YouTube

"Psychological" is a song recorded by American country music group The Band Perry. It was released as a single to country radio on February 17, 2026. It marks the band's first release under Nashville Harbor and featuring a new lineup following the departure of Kimberly's brothers in 2025.

== Background ==
Following a short hiatus in 2023, in which Kimberly released a solo project, Superbloom, the band reunited in 2025 and re-signed with BMLG, which has since been named Nashville Harbor. Kimberly's husband, Johnny Costello, joined the band as a backing vocalist, and replaced her brothers, Neil Perry and Reid Perry, after they decided to pursue other interests. Kimberly refers to the new lineup of the band as "Season 2" of the Band Perry.

== Content ==
"Psychological" was written by Clara Park, Grace Tyler, and Colton Venner, around Venner's hook of splitting the titular phrase into two words: "psycho" and "logical". Drawing off her own similar dating experiences, Tyler had initially intended to cut the song for herself, but in 2025, she decided not to record it and instead pitch it to other artists, which led it to the Band Perry. Kimberly related the song to her elopement with Costello a few years earlier. Of the song, Kimberly said: "It's just a very tongue in cheek hilarious turn of a phrase, talking about the girl inside of me that has always been 150% deep diving into my crushes and obsessions."

The Band Perry recorded the song at Blackbird Studio in Nashville. Dan Huff produced the track, and is working on producing a full album with the band.

== Music video ==
The music video for "Psychological" premiered alongside its digital release on February 13, 2026.

== Live performances ==
The Band Perry performed the song on Live with Kelly and Mark on February 17, 2026.

== Chart performance ==
"Psychological" debuted at number 43 on the Billboard Country Airplay chart dated February 21, 2026. It is their first single to reach the chart in ten years, since "Comeback Kid" in 2016.

== Charts ==
Chart performance for "Psychological"
Chart (2026)	Peak position
Canada Country (Billboard)	45
US Country Airplay (Billboard)	43
