= Baiba Bičole =

Latvian-born American poet (1931–2023)

Baiba E. Bičole (May 1931 – December 24, 2021) was a Latvian-born American poet.

== Biography ==
Baiba E. Bičole was born in Riga in May 1931, to Semigallian parents who were both literary critics - her father was a literary historian and her mother a poet and essayist. Her family fled the 1944 Soviet invasion of Latvia and emigrated to the US in 1950.

Bičole became part of the "Hell's Kitchen artists" school of Latvian exile poets, centered around the New York City area. Her first volume of poetry, Atrita, was published in 1966 and won the fourth biennial Zinaīda Lazda Prize for Poetry in 1967. Her other collections include Ceļos (1969), Burot ("To Cast Spells", 1976), Grie'os ("I Turn", 1981), and Atgriežos ("I Return", 1991). She also served as associate editor of the Latvian language New York newspaper Laiks ("Time").

Bičole married the Latvian artist Ilmārs Rumpēters and they had three children, Arvils, Artis, and Rita. Arvils Rumpēters was also a poet and died in 2000. Bičole died at her apartment in Rockville, Maryland on December 24, 2021, at the age of 90.
