= Regius Professor of Medicine =

Regius Professor of Medicine may refer to:

- Regius Professor of Medicine (Aberdeen)
- Regius Professor of Physic (Cambridge)
- Regius Professor of Physic (Dublin)
- Regius Professor of Medicine and Therapeutics (Glasgow)
- Regius Professor of Medicine (Oxford)

== See also ==
- Regius Professor
