= PJ Judge =

Irish criminal (1955–1996)

- Judge in an undated photo
- Born: Peter Joseph Judge; 27 July 1955; Dublin, Ireland
- Died: 8 December 1996 (aged 41); Finglas, Dublin, Ireland
- Cause of death: Gunshot wound
- Resting place: Glasnevin Cemetery
- Other name: "The Psycho"

Peter Joseph Judge (27 July 1955 – 8 December 1996) was an Irish crime boss and drug trafficker. Nicknamed "the Psycho", Judge controlled the trade of drugs in the Finglas, Cabra and Ballymun suburbs of Dublin before his murder in 1996.

== Early life ==
The son of Peter and Eileen Judge, Judge was the youngest of five children. He grew up in Finglas, attending school in Marlborough Street before leaving at age 14 to work with his father, who ran a small pig feed business. He later worked as a delivery boy for a bread company and had a job making cots. Judge had a stammer as a child.

== Criminal career ==
Judge was involved in crime from an early age, and his criminal activities started when he robbed a firearms dealer at age 13, for which he spent two years in St Conleth's Reformatory School in Daingean. Having spent his teenage years in and out of institutions, he began leading a burglary gang of other youths in the area.

He was charged with the robbery of over £1,000 from a savings bank in Fairview in August 1979; the van he used had been registered in the name of his associate William "Jock" Corbally. Under police questioning, Corbally told him he had loaned the van to Judge. Judge was given a ten year sentence for this, and as a result he developed a grudge with Corbally. He was charged with firearm possession relating to an attempted robbery of a post office in Ballyfermot in February 1980, for which he was convicted and sentenced to a further 10 years in prison for it; a 1984 article detailed that Judge had gone on hunger strike while in Mountjoy Prison. He was released after serving nine years total for both offenses. It was not until about 1990 that Judge entered the drug trade, introduced to it by his neighbour John "The Mexican" McKeown, a cannabis dealer in Dublin city. By the time of his murder, his gang controlled the trade of heroin and cannabis in Finglas, Cabra and Ballymun.

Judge was believed to have been behind the April 1993 murder of Michael Godfrey. Godfrey, 56, had been an associate of Judge and the two had run a counterfeiting scam together. After serving prison time in Britain, Godfrey returned to Ireland. He set up a front company with the aim of importing cannabis for sale, but after the cannabis that arrived turned out to be a different type than the one that was expected, Judge demanded Godfrey get his money back. Godfrey instead sold it to Peter "Fatso" Mitchell of John Gilligan's gang for nearly double the price. After Godfrey refused to pay Judge the money he had received for the deal, Judge decided to have him killed. Two masked men armed with handguns abducted Godfrey from his North Circular Road home, and his body was later found in a field near Blanchardstown with two bullet wounds to the head.

After being released from prison for drug possession in 1991, William "Jock" Corbally returned to Finglas, where his two teenage sons were now dealing for Judge. After they used a large quantity of cannabis they had been tasked with selling, Judge assaulted one of the sons and demanded a large ransom from the elder Corbally. After Corbally informed him he could not pay, Judge attacked him in April 1991, though Corbally came out the better of the two and landed a blow on Judge's forehead, requiring him to get a number of stitches. Judge demanded Corbally and his sons leave the country, which they did not, though Corbally was jailed for five years in 1992 for theft from a beef truck. After Corbally's release from jail, Judge plotted with an associate to lure Corbally into a trap. According to a police informant, Judge tortured Corbally and pulled out his teeth with pliers before decapitating him. His body was never found.

Newspapers could not name Judge for legal reasons, so due to his propensity towards torture and his psychopathic tendencies, news reports dubbed him "Judge Dread" and "The Psycho". When Paul Williams of the Sunday World ran an exposé on Judge over the murder of Corbally, as well as an exposé over Judge's sexuality he plotted to have Williams killed.

Shortly before his death, police had seized £70,000 which they believed had come from his drug dealing. Following his death, it was revealed that Judge had been an informer, "grassing" on fellow criminals in exchange for payment; this arrangement ended after he was arrested following a shootout.

== Personal life ==
Judge was reported to be a closeted homosexual who had been infuriated at media coverage of his activities. In his book Badfellas, Paul Williams wrote that Judge had taken sexual advantage of a number of his younger male drug dealers, and had a number of girlfriends, some of whom were prostitutes. At the time of his death, however, Judge was in a relationship with Ellen Hyland, the sister of future crime boss Martin "Marlo" Hyland, who had been a protégé of Judge's.

Judge was reported to have been violent against his partners; following Judge's murder, the Irish Times reported that Gardaí suspected Judge had beaten Ellen in the two weeks prior to his death, and were investigating this as a line of inquiry.

== Death ==
On 7 December 1996, Judge and his girlfriend Ellen had been at the Royal Oak pub in Finglas, where they watched a band perform. In the early hours of the morning, Judge was shot twice in the head by a gunman on a motorcycle. None of his fellow crime bosses attended his funeral. He is buried at Glasnevin Cemetery. Several days after Judge's murder, his associate Mark Dwyer was found shot dead.

It was initially believed that the Provisional IRA had murdered Judge due to his erratic and violent tendencies, though no one was ever convicted of the murder. A 2007 Sunday World article alleged that Marlo Hyland had Judge murdered due to him owing Judge £130,000 from the seizure of a drug shipment. Following Judge's murder, Hyland took over from him.
