= Lietuvos TSR aukštųjų mokyklų mokslo darbai =

Lietuvos TSR aukštųjų mokyklų mokslo darbai (transl. Scientific Works of Higher Education Institutions of the Lithuanian SSR) was a series of academic journals published from 1961 to 1991 in Vilnius. The series started with 15 journals mainly based on journals published by Vilnius University. In 1991, the series had 29 journals. It was published by the Ministry of the Higher and Special Education of the Lithuanian SSR (1961–1990) and by the Ministry of Education and Science of Lithuania (1990–1991). Since 1992, many of the journals are published as independent publications.

== List of journals ==
=== Continued journals ===
Title	Translated title	Year launched	Publisher	ISSN	Notes
Baltistica	Baltic Studies	1965	Vilnius University	0132-6503	
Ekonomika	Economics	1960	Vilnius University	2424-6166	
Istorija	History	1958	Vytautas Magnus University Education Academy	1392-0456	
Kalbotyra	Language Studies	1958	Vilnius University	2029-8315	
Knygotyra	Book Studies	1961	Vilnius University	0204-2061	Published as Bibliotekininkystės ir bibliografijos klausimai before 1970.
Literatūra	Literature	1958	Vilnius University	1648-1143	
Pedagogika	Pedagogy	1962	Vytautas Magnus University Education Academy	1392-0340	Published as Pedagogika ir psichologija before 1980.
Problemos	Problems	1968	Vilnius University	1392-1126	Published as Filosofija before 1968.
Psichologija	Psychology	1962	Vilnius University	1392-0359	Published as Pedagogika ir psichologija before 1980.
Teisė	Law	1957	Vilnius University	1392-1274	

=== Discontinued journals ===
Title	Translated title	Publication years	Notes
Architektūra ir miestų statyba	Architecture and City Construction	1971–1981	
Automobilių transportas	Automobile Transport	1986–1991	
Biologija	Biology	1961–1994	
Chemija ir cheminė technologija	Chemistry and Chemical Technology	1961–1990	Continued as Taikomoji mechanika (Applied Mechanics) until 1994.
Gelžbetoninės konstrukcijos	Reinforced Concrete Structures	1967–1994	
Geodezijos darbai	Geodesy Works	1963–1994	
Geografija	Geography	1961–2020	Published as Geografija ir geologija before 1978. It was merged into Geologija. Geografija in 2015.
Geologija	Geology	1980–2020	Published as Geografija ir geologija before 1978. It was merged into Geologija. Geografija in 2015.
Hidraulika ir hidrotechnika	Hydraulics and Hydrotechnics	1974–1981	
Lazeriai ir ultraspartieji vyksmai	Lasers and Ultrafast Processes	1988–1990	
Lietuvos mechanikos rinkinys	Lithuanian Mechanics Collection	1967–1994	Published as Mechanika before 1968.
LKP istorijos klausimai	CPL History Questions	1959–1990	
Mašinų gamyba	Machinery Manufacturing	1989–1994	
Medicina	Medicine	1962–1994	
Menotyra	Art Studies	1967–1993	
Radioelektronika	Radio Electronics	1966–1994	
Santechnika ir hidraulika	Plumbing and Hydraulics	1971–1994	
Statyba ir architektūra	Construction and Architecture	1961–1970	Split into five construction-related journals.
Statybinės konstrukcijos	Building Structures	1971–1995	
Statybos ekonomika ir organizavimas	Construction Economics and Organization	1971–1992	
Ultragarsas	Ultrasonics	1969–1994	
Urbanistika ir rajoninis planavimas	Urbanism and District Planning	1972–1993	
