= Psi hit =

Parapsychological result more than that expected by chance

Psi hit and psi miss are terms used in discussion of parapsychological experimentation to describe the success or failure of the subject in achieving the desired result more often than could be expected through chance alone. Used only when the results are notably better than chance.

The term psi miss specifically refers to instances where the subject has failed to achieve the result through psi, rather than where they have a non-significant negative score gained through random guessing.

== History ==
In 1942, Gertrude Schmeidler, a professor of psychology at City University of New York, used a questionnaire to discover the beliefs of test subjects concerning psi. She called those who thought psi existed "sheep", and those who did not think psi existed (or did not believe it could influence the tests) she called "goats". When she compared the results of the questionnaire to the results of the psi test, she found that the "sheep" scored significantly above chance, and the "goats" scored significantly below chance. Schmeidler's results have since been confirmed by many other researchers. In 1992, a meta-analysis of 73 experiments by 37 different researchers confirmed that subjects who believe psi is real average higher results than those who do not believe in it. A large-scale pre-registered replication in 2023 of "feeling the future" did not find any evidence for sheep-goats. According to Mario Varvoglis, PhD, President of the Parapsychological Association from 2001 to 2002:

Skeptics are justified in stating that those who believe firmly in psi will tend to see its occurrence everywhere, even to the point of confusing their own interpretations with the actual events. On the other hand, disbelievers will also tend toward the complementary fallacy, always finding some so-called "rational" explanation for a psi experience, even when it happens to them. But the sheep-goat effect suggests that the differences run deeper than mere interpretation: one's attitudes toward psi affects the likelihood that such phenomena will occur in the first place. The more an individual harbors a reductionistic view of the world, the less chance such phenomena will emerge (let alone be witnessed by them); the more one is interested in interconnectedness, and open to psi experiences, the more likely the world will "respond" by creating such experiences.

== See also ==
- Parapsychology
- Extra Sensory Perception
- True-believer syndrome
