= Killing of Baiba Saulite =

2006 shooting of a Latvian woman in Dublin

Baiba Saulite was a mother of two originally from Latvia who was shot dead outside her home in Swords, County Dublin on 19 November 2006.

== Background ==
Her children were taken from the Republic of Ireland by her former partner 'Mr A' in December 2004 and returned in September 2005. He had pleaded guilty to abducting the children and was sentenced to two years imprisonment. At the time of the killing he was already serving a four-year sentence for his part in a plan to export stolen cars to the Middle East.

After his conviction, Baiba wrote a twelve-page victim impact statement saying that she was very worried for her safety. She was shot dead five days later.

Nobody was ever convicted of her murder.

== Aftermath ==
Her solicitor was under armed Garda protection after the murder, despite denials from Gardaí at the time.

Detective Garda Walter O'Sullivan said he believed that Ms Saulite was specifically targeted, that information gathered during the investigation suggested a contract had been taken out on her. He said suspects were identified and prosecution recommended when sending the case to the Director of Public Prosecutions. The DPP chose not to prosecute, which surprised O'Sullivan.

== Disclosures tribunal ==
On 1 February 2022 the Disclosures Tribunal opened an investigation into her death.

Former Garda Sergeant William Hughes had been attached to the community policing unit at Swords Garda station at the time. He had investigated the abduction of her children between 2004 and 2006. Her children were located in Lebanon and she travelled there to collect them. A man referred to as "Mr A" pleaded guilty to their abduction. Baiba met with Garda Hughes and Garda Declan Nyhan at Swords Garda station to draft a victim impact statement. She handed Garda Hughes a twelve-page handwritten statement that was for the sentencing hearing of "Mr A". It detailed a history of abuse against her and near the end she wrote she was "very scared for my life". She was not making a formal complaint against "Mr A" at this time. Some elements of the draft impact statement were not suitable and she was to return to the Garda station to complete it. When she was shot dead Garda Hughes said he was "shocked and upset" when told. He told the tribunal "I was extremely shocked that things got to this stage and I felt things had gone terribly wrong with the entire matter, it shouldn't have happened. When it happened and after I was thinking was there a way we could have prevented this".

He told tribunal investigators: "I began making allegations about a ‘systems failure’, in respect of all investigations related to the murder, including the child abduction case, in which I was involved." He also said "What I was saying was that numerous related crimes, including the child abduction case and threats to Baiba Saulite and her Solicitor John Hennessy which occurred in 2006 were not properly correlated and coordinated." He had told an investigation that there was "a systemic failure" that "ultimately permitted a critical chain of events to transpire before the death of Baiba Saulite". He said that "the responsibility for the failure rests with senior management" and claimed he was "subjected to a horrendous cycle of intimidation, bullying and harassment".

In 2007 there was a Garda investigation into an alleged breach of discipline by Hughes. It was to determine if he "in possession of documentation or information" that meant that he "ought to have known" about "he existence of a real and immediate risk to the life of Baiba Saulite". In 2009 the investigation concluded that there was no breach of discipline on his part.

The tribunal is to determine if Assistant Commissioner McHugh or Chief Superintendent Michael Feehan tried "to target or discredit" Hughes by initiating the disciplinary procedure because Hughes had made a protected disclosure. Gardaí deny this.

On 2 February 2022 Hughes testified that in the days after the killing of Baiba Saulite The Irish Sun carried an article claiming there was "a hit out to get the garda that reunited Baiba Saulite with her children". Hughes raised the article with his superiors, saying it was "dangerously menacing" and that he was not the source of the article.

He also testified about his concerns about a Garda Press Office press release on 22 November 2006. The release said that at no time prior to her killing was Ms Saulites solicitor given full time Garda protection but that he was given extensive advice on enhancements he could make to his home. It also said Ms Saulite had been given similar advice. Hughes said he has since learned that she was given no such advice.

Gardaí investigating the murder of Ms. Saulite were told to get the victim impact statement by breaking into the locker of Sgt. Hughes. Assistant Commissioner Al McHugh ordered Gardaí to force the locker to get the statement, if necessary.

Retired Detective Chief Superintendent Kevin Donoghue, former head of the Garda Press Office, testified about a nine paragraph statement given in this name on 22 November 2006. The statement claimed that its purpose was to "clarify the factual position", saying there were media inaccuracies. The statement claimed the Gardaí had become aware of threats against her solicitor prior to her murder. He had been advised immediately of the threats as had she, the statement claimed.

Kevin Donoghue said that no such advise had been given either to Ms Saulite or her solicitor, agreeing with counsel for Hughes.

He also testified that he didn't know that Ms. Saulite had expressed concerns for her safety for a long time. Donoghue said that he got information about the case after the murder from a senior officer stationed locally. He said the statement was issued under his name because the case of Ms. Saulite was more serious than cases usually handled by the Garda Press Office. He denied that Hughes had been targeted and that the statement was made in good faith.
