= Noonan =

Noonan (Irish: Ó Nuanáin, Ó Núnáin and Ó hIonmhaineáin) is an Irish surname.

== People ==
Notable people with the surname Noonan include:

- Aileen Noonan (born 1950), Irish chess master
- Bill Noonan (1947–2021), New Zealand rugby player
- Brian Noonan (born 1965), ice hockey player
- Buddy Noonan (1937–1989), American cinematographer, actor, and entertainer
- Carol Noonan, American folksinger
- Chris Noonan (disambiguation), various people
  - Chris Noonan (born 1952), Australian filmmaker
  - Chris Noonan (academic), New Zealand law academic
- Christine Noonan (1945–2003), British actress
- Desmond Noonan (1951–2005) and Dominic Noonan (born 1966), British mobsters
- Diana Noonan (born 1960), New Zealand children's author
- Edward Noonan (disambiguation), various people
  - Edward A. Noonan (1852–1927), American politician from St Louis
  - Edward C. Noonan (born 1948), American politician
  - Edward Thomas Noonan (1861–1923), American politician from Illinois
  - Edward Noonan (architect) (born 1930), Chicago architect and developer
- Frederick Noonan (1893–missing 1937, declared dead 1938), aviator who accompanied Amelia Earhart on her ill-fated last flight
- Jacqueline Noonan (1928–2020), American pediatric cardiologist
- John T. Noonan Jr. (1926–2017), American judge
- Katie Noonan (born 1977), Australian singer and songwriter
- Kelly Noonan Murphy (born 1974 or 1975), American politician
- Michael Noonan (disambiguation)
  - Michael Noonan (Fine Gael politician) (born 1943), Irish politician
  - Michael J. Noonan (Fianna Fáil politician) (1935–2013), Irish politician
- Nick Noonan (born 1989), American baseball player
- Nick Noonan (musician), member of musical duo Karmin
- Pat Noonan (born 1980), American soccer (football) player
- Paddy Noonan (1875–1935), Australian rules footballer
- Peggy Noonan (born 1950), author and primary speech writer for Ronald Reagan
- Robert Noonan (1870–1911), Irish writer under the pseudonym Robert Tressell
- Ros Noonan (born 1946), New Zealand politician and trade unionist, later Human Rights Commissioner
- Sinéad Noonan (born 1987), Irish model, actress and Miss Ireland 2008
- Thomas Noonan (disambiguation), various people
  - Tommy Noonan (1921–1968), American actor
  - Thomas S. Noonan (1938–2001), American historian, anthropologist and Slavicist
  - Thomas P. Noonan, Jr. (1943–1969), American Marine lance corporal
  - Tom Noonan (1951–2026), American actor, director, and screenwriter
  - Thomas Noonan (musician) (born 1974), American drummer
- Wade Noonan (born 1971), Australian politician

== Places ==
- Noonan, New Brunswick, Canada, a small community
- Noonan, Missouri, a ghost town
- Noonan, North Dakota, a city

== See also ==
- Nunan
- Noonan syndrome, named after Jacqueline Noonan
