= Office of the Chief Trade Adviser =

Independent trade advisory body of the Forum Islands Countries

The Office of the Chief Trade Adviser (OCTA) is an independent trade advisory body of the Forum Island Countries. OCTA provides policy advice and capacity-building support to the Forum Island Countries, particularly in the Pacific Agreement on Closer Economic Relations (PACER) Plus trade negotiations with Australia and New Zealand. OCTA was established on 29 March 2010 and is based in Port Vila, Vanuatu. The first to be appointed to the Chief Trade Adviser position was Chris Noonan, an academic from New Zealand. Noonan resigned in September 2011. The OCTA Governing Board then appointed Julia Tijaja, the Trade Policy Adviser, as Caretaker Chief Trade Adviser in the interim until the new Chief Trade Adviser came on board. In February 2012, Edwini Kessie, an international trade law expert, was appointed the new Chief Trade Adviser. Kessie took up his post in June 2012. Thirteen Forum Island Countries are currently members of the OCTA; Cook Islands, Federated States of Micronesia, Kiribati, Nauru, Niue, Palau, Papua New Guinea, Marshall Islands, Samoa, Solomon Islands, Tonga, Tuvalu and Vanuatu. OCTA is fully owned and is under the exclusive control of its members.

As the signing of the PACERPlus marks the end of the work OCTA was set up to do, the negotiations of the PACERPlus, OCTA was disestablished and closed at the end of 2017.

== See also ==
- Caribbean Regional Negotiating Machinery - similar office in the Caribbean Community
