= 2012 United States presidential election in California =

- November 6, 2012
- Turnout: 72.36% (of registered voters) ▼7.06 pp 55.47% (of eligible voters) ▼3.75 pp

Nominee	Barack Obama	Mitt Romney
Party	Democratic	Republican
Home state	Illinois	Massachusetts
Running mate	Joe Biden	Paul Ryan
Electoral vote	55	0
Popular vote	7,854,285	4,839,958
Percentage	60.24%	37.12%

Obama
40–50%
50–60%
60–70%
70–80%
80–90%
Romney
40–50%
50–60%
60–70%
President before election
Barack Obama
Democratic
Elected President
Barack Obama
Democratic

The 2012 United States presidential election in California took place on November 6, 2012, as part of the 2012 United States presidential election in which all 50 states plus the District of Columbia participated. California voters chose 55 electors, the most out of any state, to represent them in the Electoral College via a popular vote pitting incumbent Democratic President Barack Obama and his running mate, Vice President Joe Biden, against Republican challenger and former Massachusetts Governor Mitt Romney and his running mate, Congressman Paul Ryan.

Prior to the election, every major news network considered California to be a state Obama would win or a safe blue state. According to Secretary of State Debra Bowen's website, the President won the popular vote with 60.24%, with Mitt Romney in second place at 37.12%, and Libertarian candidate Gary Johnson in third at 1.10%. The Democrats have won the state in every presidential election after Republican George H. W. Bush won the state in 1988.

As of the 2024 presidential election, this is the last presidential election in which the nominee from the Republican Party won Orange County—a longtime, traditional bastion for the national GOP—and Nevada County. With its 55 electoral votes, California was Obama's largest electoral prize in 2012.

== Primary elections ==
=== Democratic primary ===
2012 California Democratic presidential primary
- June 5, 2012

609 Democratic National Convention delegates (547 pledged, 62 unpledged) The number of pledged delegates won was determined by the popular vote
Candidate	Barack Obama
Home state	Illinois
Delegate count	547
Popular vote	2,075,905
Percentage	100%
- California results by county Barack Obama

The 2012 California Democratic presidential primary took place on June 5, 2012, as part of the 2012 Democratic Party presidential primaries.

2012 California Democratic presidential primary
Candidate	Popular vote	%	Delegates
Barack Obama (incumbent)	2,075,905	100%	547.0
Darcy Richardson (write-in)	221	0.00%	0.0
Michael W.R. Meyer, Jr. (write-in)	129	0.00%	0.0
Louis Alberto Ramos, Jr. (write-in)	54	0.00%	0.0
Uncommitted	—N/a		62.0
Total	2,076,309	100%	609

=== Republican primary ===
2012 California Republican presidential primary
- June 5, 2012

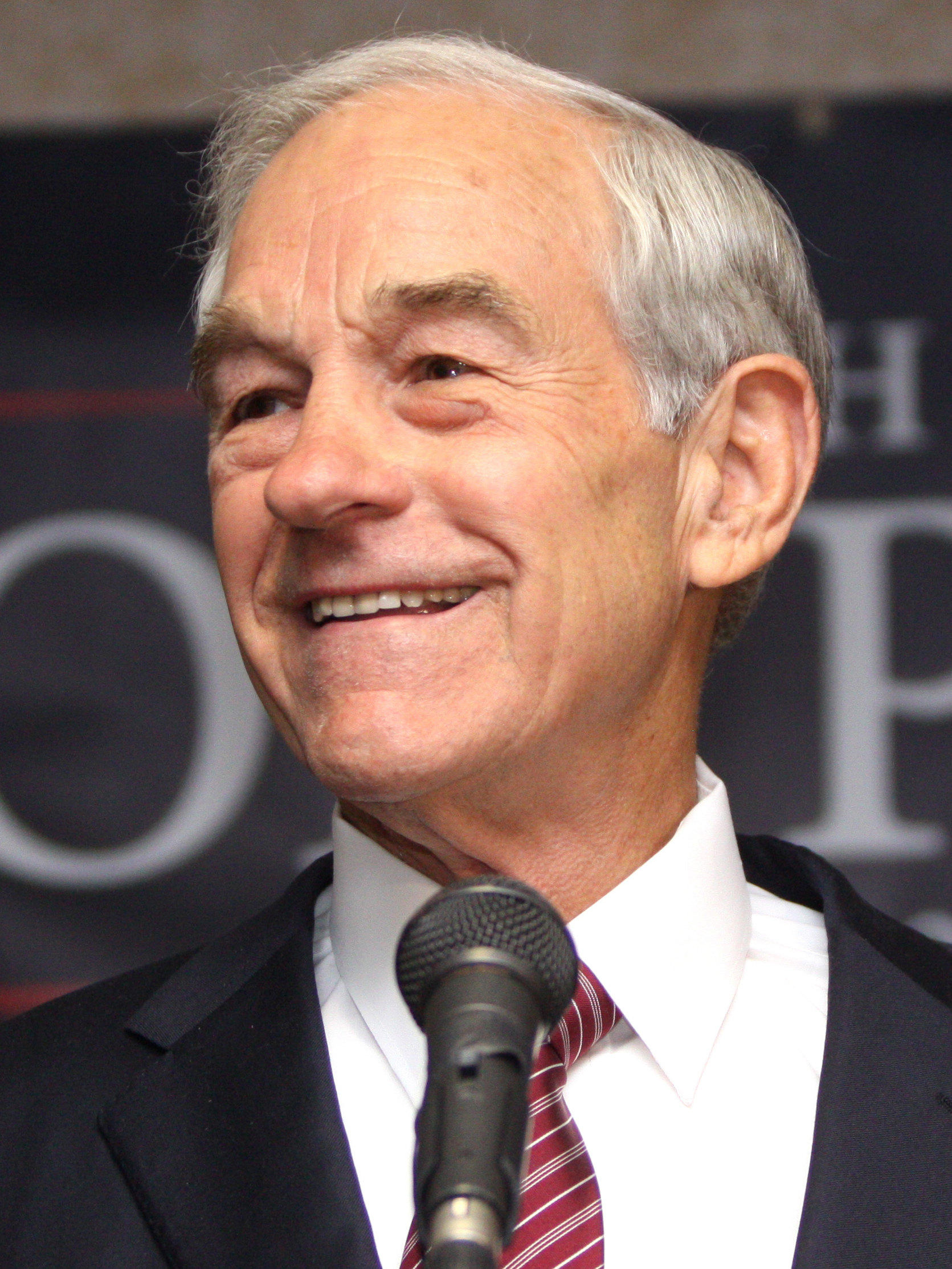

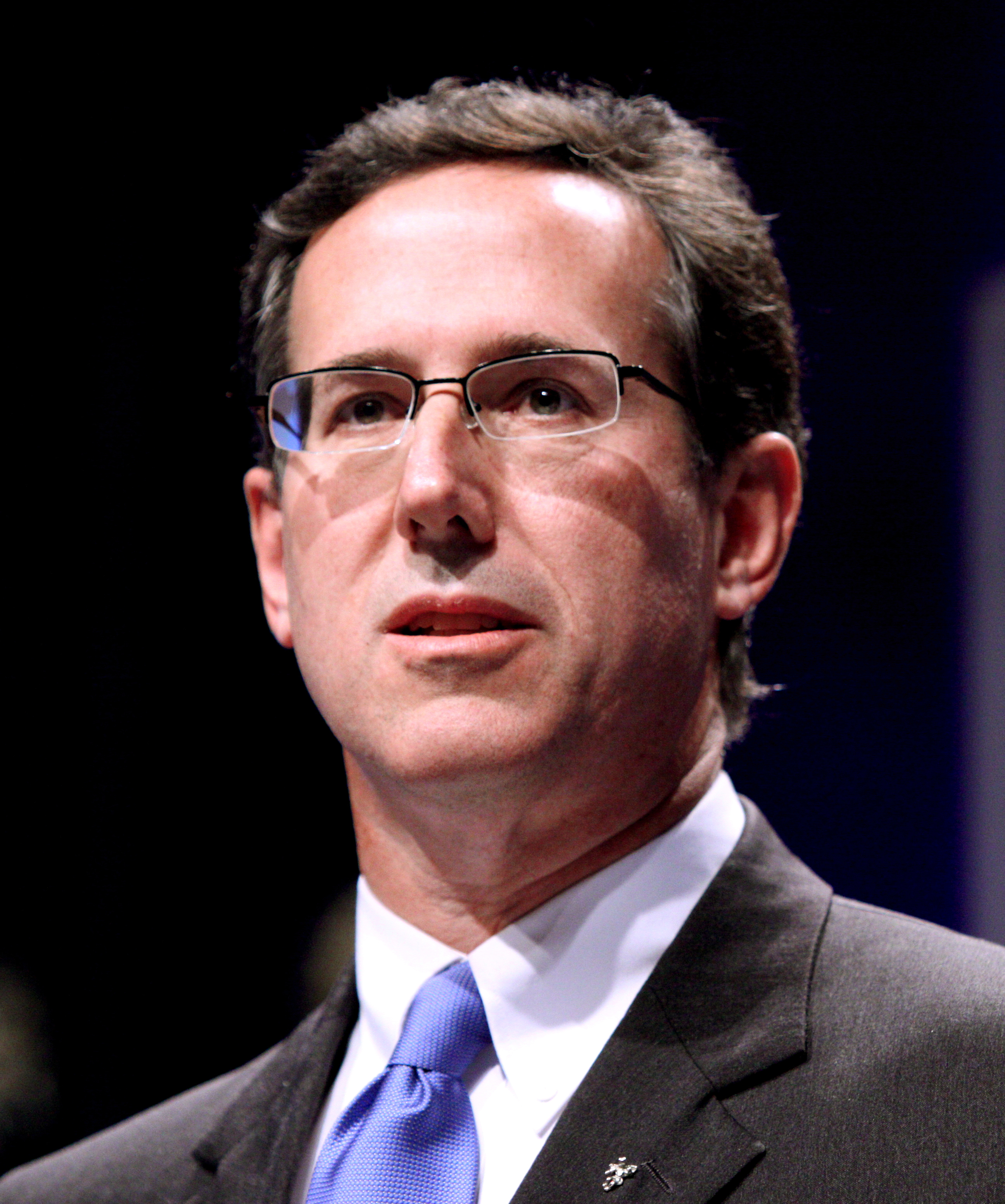
Candidate	Mitt Romney	Ron Paul	Rick Santorum
Home state	Massachusetts	Texas	Pennsylvania
Delegate count	171	0	0
Popular vote	1,530,513	199,246	102,258
Percentage	79.51%	10.35%	5.31%
- California results by county Mitt Romney (Note: Italicization indicates a withdrawn candidacy)

The 2012 California Republican Party presidential primary took place on June 5, 2012, as part of the 2012 Republican Party presidential primaries. 169 delegates were chosen, for a total of 172 delegates at the 2012 Republican National Convention.

As noted in the Green Papers for California, "159 district delegates are to be bound to presidential contenders based on the primary results in each of the 53 congressional districts: each congressional district is assigned 3 National Convention delegates and the presidential contender receiving the greatest number of votes in that district will receive all 3 of that district's National Convention delegates. 10 at-large delegates (10 base at-large delegates plus 0 bonus delegate) are to be bound to the presidential contender receiving the greatest number of votes in the primary statewide. In addition, 3 party leaders, the National Committeeman, the National Committeewoman, and the chairman of the California's Republican Party, will attend the convention as unpledged delegates by virtue of their position."

2012 California Republican presidential primary
Candidate	Popular vote	%	Delegates
Mitt Romney	1,530,513	79.51%	169
Ron Paul	199,246	10.35%	0
Rick Santorum (withdrawn)	102,258	5.31%	0
Newt Gingrich (withdrawn)	72,022	3.74%	0
Charles E. "Buddy" Roemer, III (withdrawn)	12,520	0.65%	0
Fred Karger	8,393	0.44%	0
Jeremy Hannon (write-in)	11	0.00%	0
Donald James Gonzales (write-in)	5	0.00%	0
Sheldon Yeu Howard (write-in)	2	0.00%	0
Uncommitted	—N/a		3
Total	1,924,970	100%	172

=== Green primary ===
2012 California Green Party presidential primary
- June 5, 2012

68 Green National Convention delegates The number of delegates won was determined by the popular vote
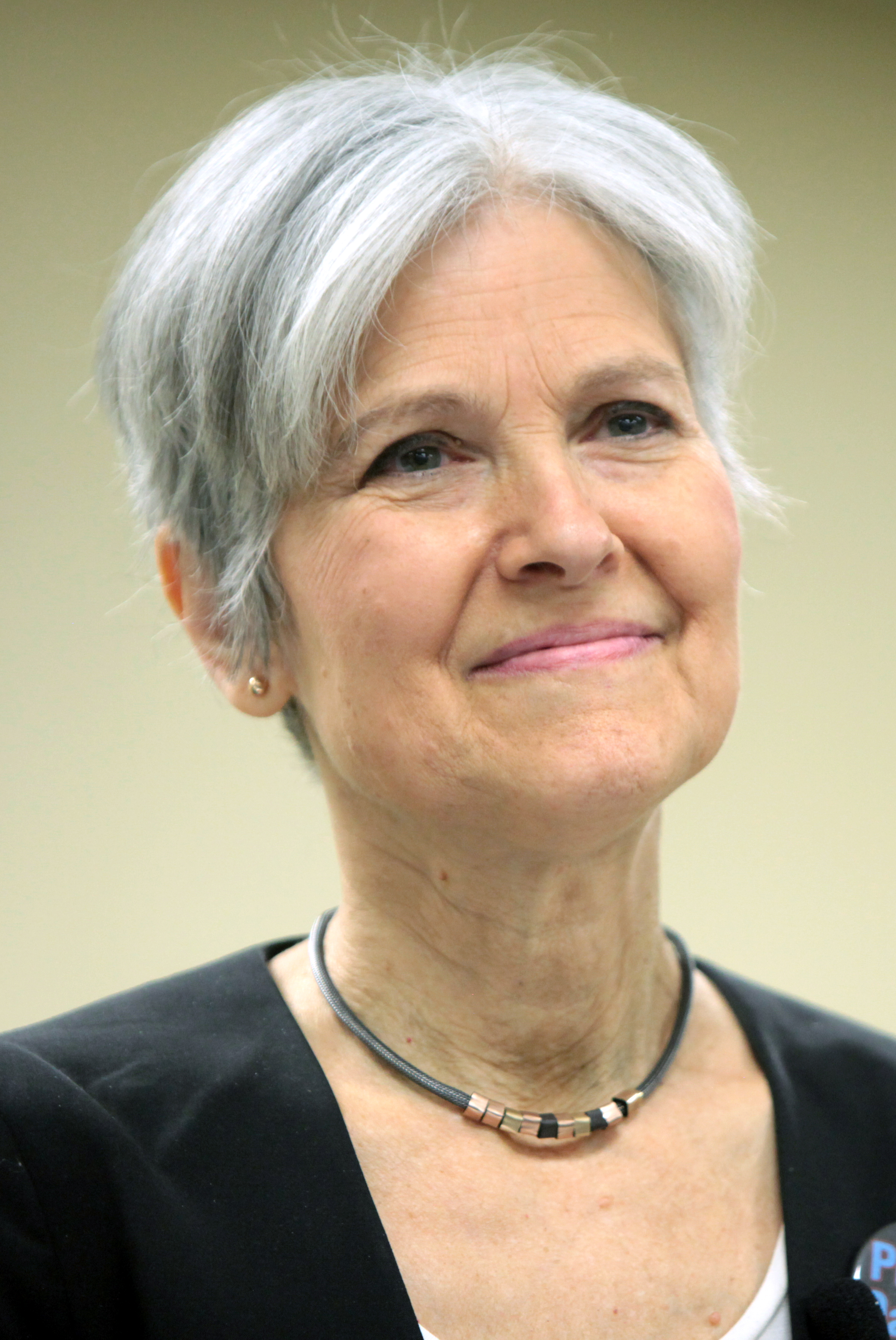

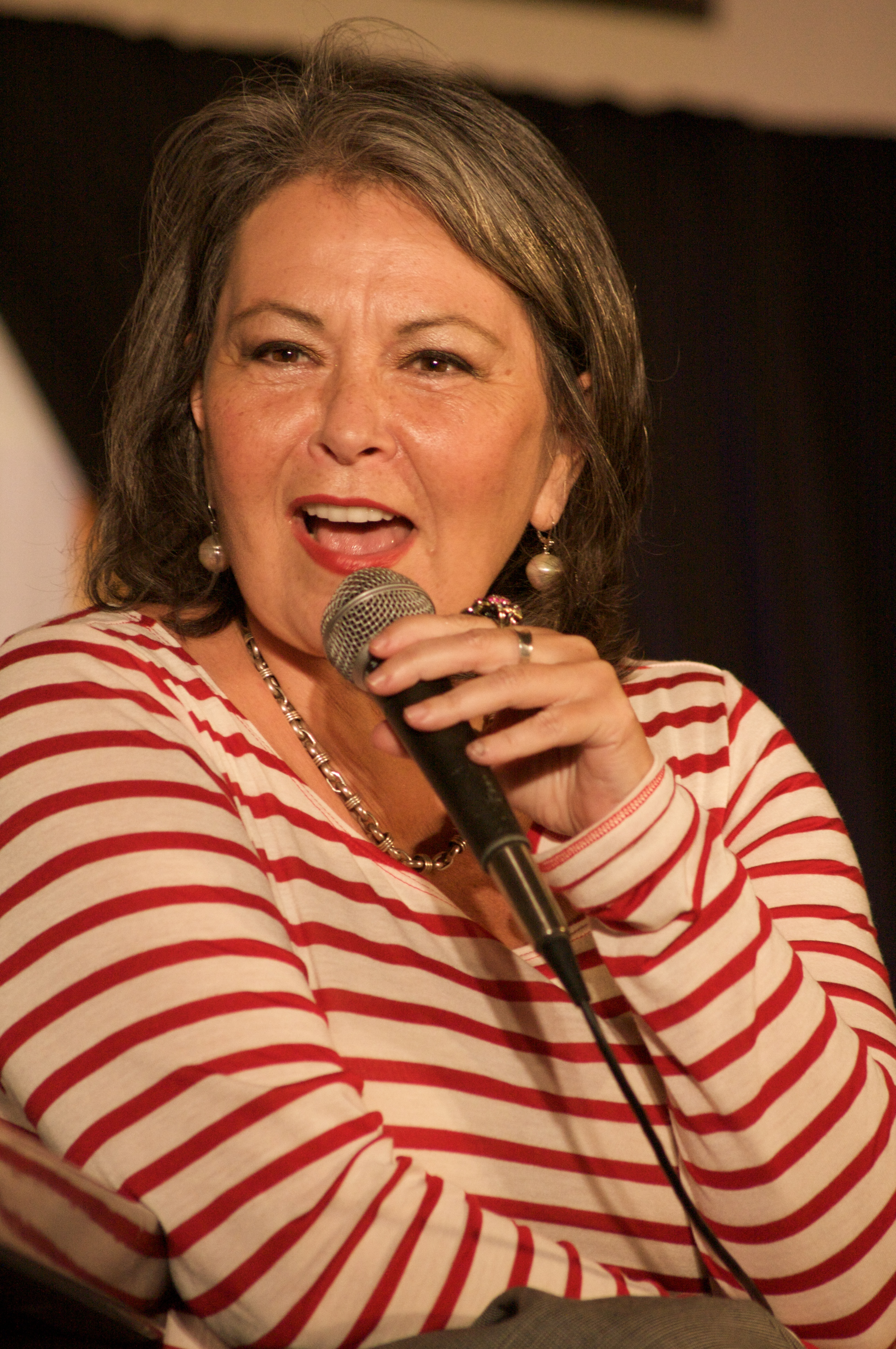

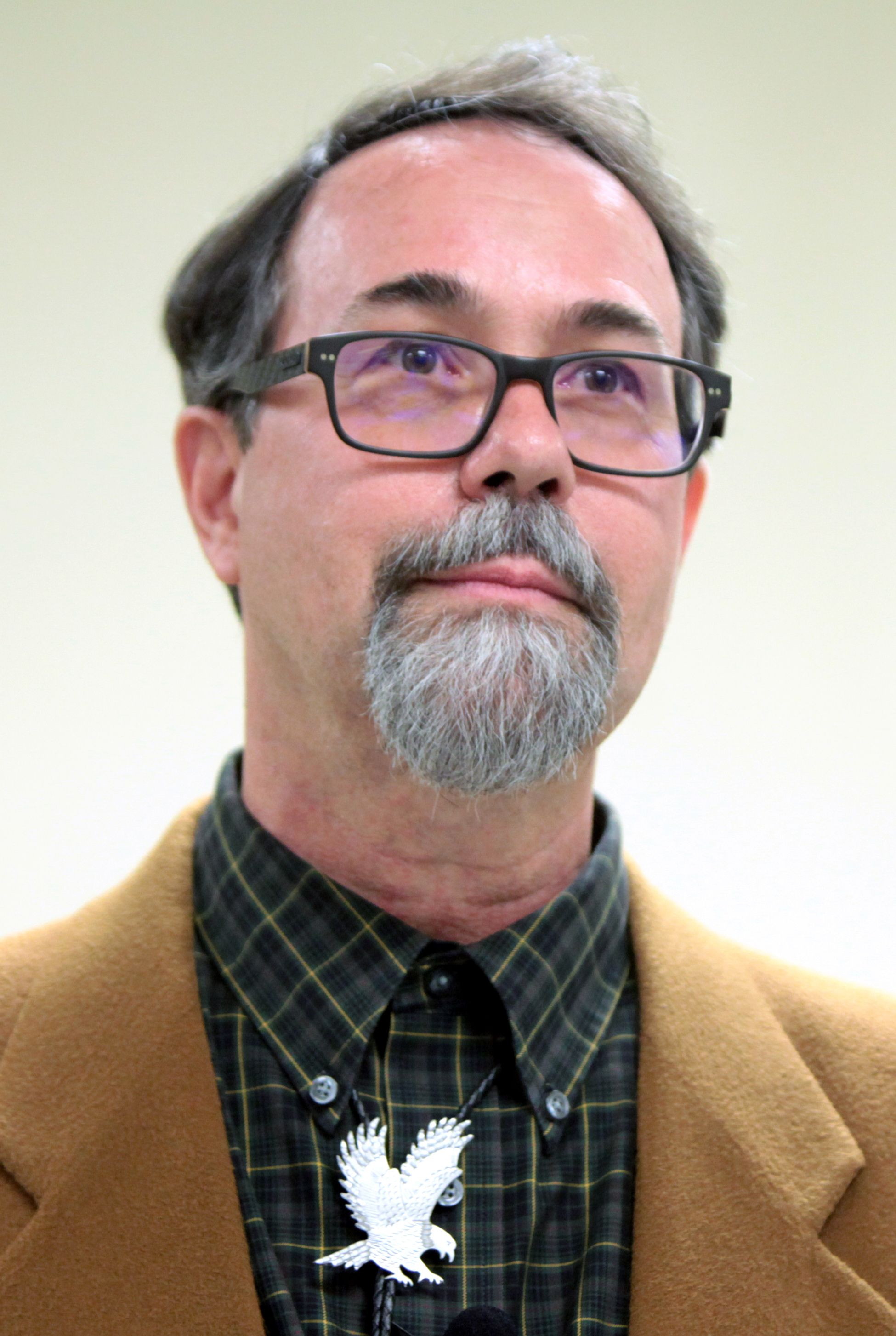
Candidate	Jill Stein	Roseanne Barr	Kent Mesplay
Home state	Massachusetts	Hawaii	California
Delegate count	35	26	7
Popular vote	9,165	7,399	2,005
Percentage	49.36%	39.85%	10.80%

The 2012 California Green Party presidential primary took place on June 5, 2012, as part of the 2012 Green Party presidential primaries.

Green Party of California presidential primary, June 5, 2012
Candidate	Votes	Percentage	National delegates
Jill Stein	9,165	49.36%	35
Roseanne Barr	7,399	39.85%	26
Kent Meslplay	2,005	10.80%	7
Total	18,569	100%	68

=== Libertarian primary ===
2012 California Libertarian Party presidential primary
- June 5, 2012
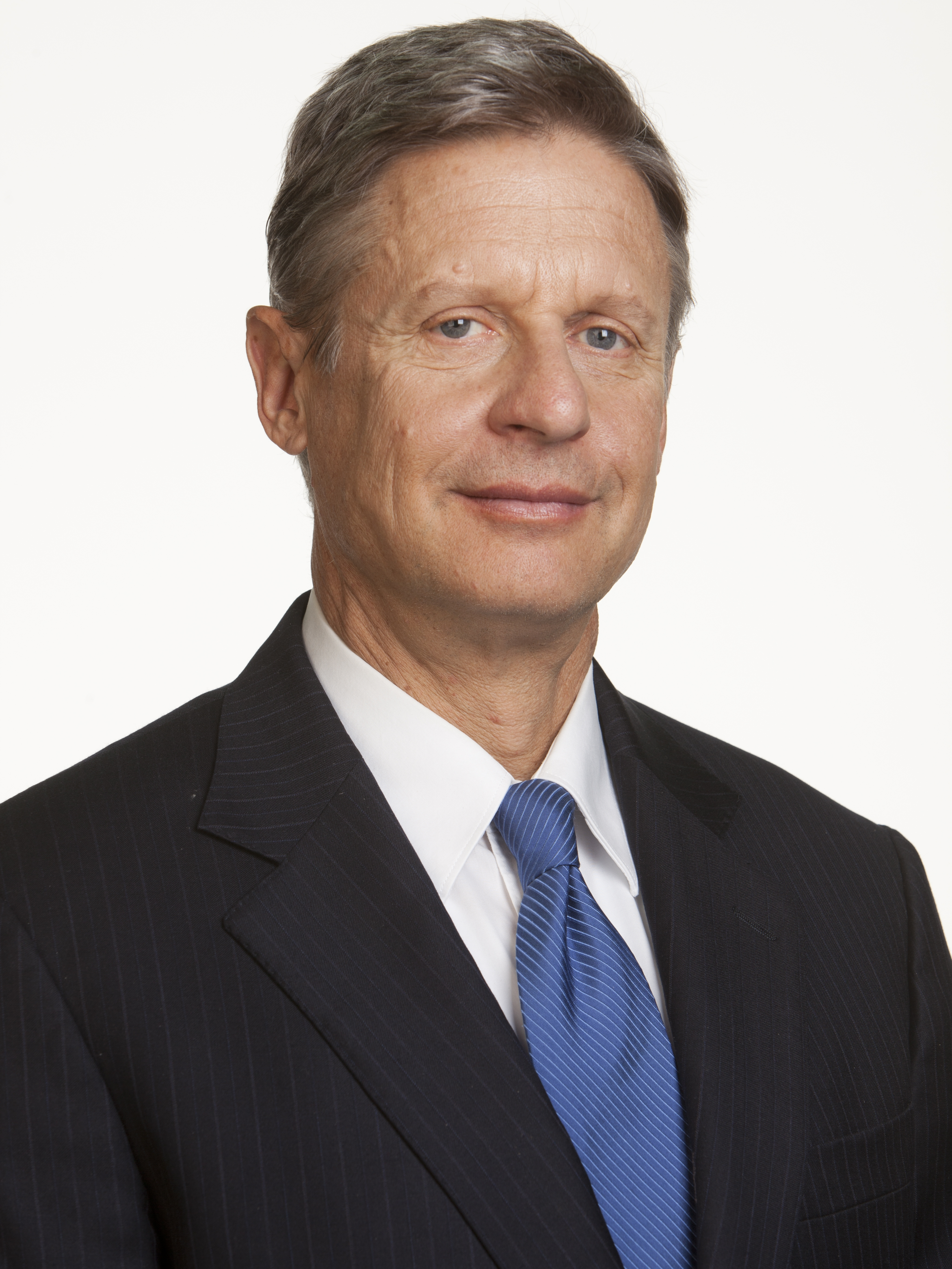

Candidate	Gary Johnson	Barbara Joy Waymire	Scott Keller
Home state	New Mexico
Popular vote	6,780	2,118	1,208
Percentage	49.98%	15.61%	8.91%

The 2012 California Libertarian Party presidential primary took place on June 5, 2012, as part of the 2012 Libertarian Party presidential primaries.

The primary was non-binding, and took place after Gary Johnson had already won the Libertarian nomination at the Party's 2012 convention.

California Libertarian presidential primary, June 5, 2012
Candidate	Votes	Percentage
Gary Johnson	6,780	50.0%
Barbara Joy Waymire	2,118	15.6%
Scott Keller	1,208	8.9%
R. J. Harris	670	4.9%
Bill Still	670	4.9%
Roger Gary	559	4.1%
James Ogle	558	4.1%
Carl Person	523	3.9%
Lee Wrights	479	3.5%
Total	13,565	100%

=== Other parties ===
==== American Independent ====
The American Independent Party, a far-right and paleoconservative political party that formed when endorsing the candidacy of George Wallace in 1968 held a small presidential primary on June 5. It was won by Edward C. Noonan. However, the party would instead opt to nominate Tom Hoefling for president.

California American Independent presidential primary, June 5, 2012
Candidate	Votes	Percentage
Edward C. Noonan	16,926	38.7%
Laurie Roth	16,326	37.4%
Mad Max Riekse	10,430	23.9%
Raymond Delmond Smith (write-in)	6	0.0%
Andrew Abe Diaz (write-in)	4	0.0%
Total	43,692	100%

==== Peace and Freedom ====
California Peace and Freedom presidential primary, June 5, 2012
Candidate	Votes	Percentage
Ross C. "Rocky" Anderson	1,589	43.4%
Stewart Alexander	1,094	29.9%
Stephen Durham	971	26.5%
Shelley Upchurch (write-in)	4	0.1%
Ronald Clinton Forbes (write-in)	2	0.1%
Leon Leo Ray (write-in)	2	0.1%
Total	3,662	100%

== General election ==
=== Candidate ballot access ===
- Mitt Romney/Paul Ryan, Republican
- Barack Obama/Joseph Biden, Democratic
- Gary Johnson/James P. Gray, Libertarian
- Jill Stein/Cheri Honkala, Green
- Tom Hoefling/Robert Ornelas, Independent
- Roseanne Barr/Cindy Sheehan, Peace and Freedom

Write-in candidate access:

- Virgil Goode/Jim Clymer, Constitution
- Rocky Anderson/Luis J. Rodriguez, Justice
- James Harris/Maura DeLuca, Socialist Workers
- Stewart Alexander/Alejandro Mendoza, Socialist
- Jerry White/Phyllis Scherrer, Socialist Equality
- Stephen Durham/Christina Lopez, Freedom Socialist
- Ron Paul/Andrew Napolitano

=== Predictions ===
Source	Ranking	As of
Huffington Post	Safe D	November 6, 2012
CNN	Safe D	November 6, 2012
The New York Times	Safe D	November 6, 2012
The Washington Post	Safe D	November 6, 2012
RealClearPolitics	Solid D	November 6, 2012
Sabato's Crystal Ball	Solid D	November 5, 2012
FiveThirtyEight	Solid D	November 6, 2012

=== Results ===
2012 United States presidential election in California
Party	Candidate	Running mate	Votes	Percentage	Electoral votes
Democratic	Barack Hussein Obama (incumbent)	Joseph Robinette Biden Jr. (incumbent)	7,854,285	60.24%	55
Republican	Willard Mitt Romney	Paul Davis Ryan	4,839,958	37.12%	0
Libertarian	Gary Johnson	Jim Gray	143,221	1.10%	0
Green	Jill Stein	Cheri Honkala	85,638	0.66%	0
Peace and Freedom	Roseanne Barr	Cindy Sheehan	53,824	0.41%	0
American Independent	Thomas Hoefling	Robert Ornelas	38,372	0.29%	0
Independent	Ron Paul (write-in)	Andrew Napolitano	21,461	0.16%	0
Independent	Rocky Anderson (write-in)	Luis Rodriguez	992	0.01%	0
Independent	Virgil Goode (write-in)	Jim Clymer	503	0.00%	0
Independent	Stewart Alexander (write-in)	Alejandro Mendoza	82	0.00%	0
Independent	Jerry White (write-in)	Phyllis Scherrer	79	0.00%	0
Independent	James Harris (write-in)	Maura DeLuca	72	0.00%	0
Independent	Stephen Durham (write-in)	Christina López	54	0.00%	0
Independent	Sheila Tittle (write-in)	Matthew Turner	6	0.00%	0
Valid votes			13,038,547	98.76%	—
Invalid or blank votes			163,611	1.24%	—
Totals			13,202,158	100.00%	55
Voter turnout			72.35%		—

==== By county ====
County	Barack Obama Democratic		Mitt Romney Republican		Various candidates Other parties		Margin		Total votes cast
County	#	%	#	%	#	%	#	%	Total votes cast
Alameda	469,684	78.85%	108,182	18.16%	17,776	2.98%	361,502	60.69%	595,642
Alpine	389	59.57%	236	36.14%	28	4.29%	153	23.43%	653
Amador	6,830	38.70%	10,281	58.25%	538	3.05%	-3,451	-19.55%	17,649
Butte	42,669	47.02%	44,479	49.01%	3,604	3.97%	-1,810	-1.99%	90,752
Calaveras	8,670	39.80%	12,365	56.76%	751	3.45%	-3,695	-16.96%	21,786
Colusa	2,314	38.35%	3,601	59.68%	119	1.97%	-1,287	-21.33%	6,034
Contra Costa	290,824	66.36%	136,517	31.15%	10,885	2.48%	154,307	35.21%	438,226
Del Norte	3,791	43.23%	4,614	52.61%	365	4.16%	-823	-9.38%	8,770
El Dorado	35,166	39.61%	50,973	57.42%	2,635	2.97%	-15,807	-17.81%	88,774
Fresno	129,129	49.89%	124,490	48.10%	5,208	2.01%	4,639	1.79%	258,827
Glenn	3,301	35.84%	5,632	61.14%	278	3.02%	-2,331	-25.31%	9,211
Humboldt	34,457	59.96%	18,825	32.76%	4,188	7.29%	15,632	27.20%	57,470
Imperial	25,136	65.18%	12,777	33.13%	652	1.69%	12,359	32.05%	38,565
Inyo	3,422	42.58%	4,340	54.01%	274	3.41%	-918	-11.42%	8,036
Kern	89,495	40.41%	126,618	57.17%	5,359	2.42%	-37,123	-16.76%	221,472
Kings	12,979	41.31%	17,671	56.24%	768	2.44%	-4,692	-14.93%	31,418
Lake	13,163	56.27%	9,200	39.33%	1,028	4.39%	3,963	16.94%	23,391
Lassen	3,053	28.58%	7,296	68.30%	334	3.13%	-4,243	-39.72%	10,683
Los Angeles	2,216,903	69.69%	885,333	27.83%	78,831	2.48%	1,331,570	41.86%	3,181,067
Madera	16,018	40.18%	22,852	57.32%	996	2.50%	-6,834	-17.14%	39,866
Marin	99,896	74.26%	30,880	22.96%	3,740	2.78%	69,016	51.31%	134,516
Mariposa	3,498	38.87%	5,140	57.11%	362	4.02%	-1,642	-18.24%	9,000
Mendocino	23,193	66.23%	9,658	27.58%	2,166	6.19%	13,535	38.65%	35,017
Merced	33,005	53.18%	27,581	44.44%	1,471	2.37%	5,424	8.74%	62,057
Modoc	1,111	27.87%	2,777	69.67%	98	2.46%	-1,666	-41.80%	3,986
Mono	2,733	52.75%	2,285	44.10%	163	3.15%	448	8.65%	5,181
Monterey	82,920	67.13%	37,390	30.27%	3,208	2.60%	45,530	36.86%	123,518
Napa	35,870	62.97%	19,526	34.28%	1,572	2.76%	16,344	28.69%	56,968
Nevada	24,663	47.73%	24,986	48.35%	2,027	3.92%	-323	-0.63%	51,676
Orange	512,440	45.65%	582,332	51.87%	27,892	2.48%	-69,892	-6.23%	1,122,664
Placer	66,818	39.00%	99,921	58.32%	4,583	2.68%	-33,103	-19.32%	171,322
Plumas	4,026	40.07%	5,721	56.94%	300	2.99%	-1,695	-16.87%	10,047
Riverside	329,063	49.71%	318,127	48.06%	14,717	2.22%	10,936	1.65%	661,907
Sacramento	300,503	58.15%	202,514	39.19%	13,792	2.67%	97,989	18.96%	516,809
San Benito	11,276	59.21%	7,343	38.56%	425	2.23%	3,933	20.65%	19,044
San Bernardino	305,109	52.47%	262,358	45.12%	14,050	2.42%	42,751	7.35%	581,517
San Diego	626,957	52.58%	536,726	45.02%	28,599	2.40%	90,231	7.57%	1,192,282
San Francisco	301,723	83.53%	47,076	13.03%	12,410	3.44%	254,647	70.50%	361,209
San Joaquin	114,121	55.75%	86,071	42.05%	4,505	2.20%	28,050	13.70%	204,697
San Luis Obispo	61,258	48.76%	59,967	47.73%	4,413	3.51%	1,291	1.03%	125,638
San Mateo	206,085	72.13%	72,756	25.46%	6,879	2.41%	133,329	46.66%	285,720
Santa Barbara	94,129	57.63%	64,606	39.56%	4,585	2.81%	29,523	18.08%	163,320
Santa Clara	450,818	70.10%	174,843	27.19%	17,430	2.71%	275,975	42.91%	643,091
Santa Cruz	90,805	75.61%	24,047	20.02%	5,243	4.37%	66,758	55.59%	120,095
Shasta	25,819	33.82%	48,067	62.97%	2,449	3.21%	-22,248	-29.15%	76,335
Sierra	653	36.38%	1,056	58.83%	86	4.79%	-403	-22.45%	1,795
Siskiyou	8,046	40.41%	11,077	55.64%	787	3.95%	-3,031	-15.22%	19,910
Solano	96,783	63.49%	52,092	34.17%	3,569	2.34%	44,691	29.32%	152,444
Sonoma	153,942	71.10%	54,784	25.30%	7,782	3.59%	99,158	45.80%	216,508
Stanislaus	77,724	50.03%	73,459	47.28%	4,186	2.69%	4,265	2.75%	155,369
Sutter	12,192	39.30%	18,122	58.41%	712	2.29%	-5,930	-19.11%	31,026
Tehama	7,934	34.53%	14,235	61.95%	808	3.52%	-6,301	-27.42%	22,977
Trinity	2,674	47.13%	2,716	47.87%	284	5.01%	-42	-0.74%	5,674
Tulare	41,752	41.30%	56,956	56.34%	2,392	2.37%	-15,204	-15.04%	101,100
Tuolumne	9,998	40.50%	13,880	56.22%	809	3.28%	-3,882	-15.72%	24,687
Ventura	170,929	52.28%	147,958	45.25%	8,087	2.47%	22,971	7.03%	326,974
Yolo	48,715	65.41%	23,368	31.38%	2,392	3.21%	25,347	34.03%	74,475
Yuba	7,711	39.14%	11,275	57.23%	714	3.62%	-3,564	-18.09%	19,700
Total	7,854,285	60.24%	4,839,958	37.12%	344,304	2.64%	3,014,327	23.12%	13,038,547

Counties that flipped from Democratic to Republican

- Butte (largest city: Chico)
- Nevada (largest town: Truckee)
- Trinity (largest community: Weaverville)

==== By congressional district ====
Obama won 41 of 53 congressional districts, including three held by Republicans.

District	Obama	Romney	Representative
1st	40%	57%	Doug LaMalfa
2nd	69%	27%	Jared Huffman
3rd	54%	43%	John Garamendi
4th	40%	58%	Tom McClintock
5th	70%	27%	Mike Thompson
6th	69%	28%	Doris Matsui
7th	51%	47%	Ami Bera
8th	42%	56%	Paul Cook
9th	58%	40%	Jerry McNerney
10th	51%	47%	Jeff Denham
11th	68%	30%	George Miller
12th	84%	12%	Nancy Pelosi
13th	88%	9%	Barbara Lee
14th	74%	24%	Jackie Speier
15th	68%	30%	Eric Swalwell
16th	59%	39%	Jim Costa
17th	72%	26%	Mike Honda
18th	68%	29%	Anna Eshoo
19th	71%	27%	Zoe Lofgren
20th	71%	26%	Sam Farr
21st	55%	44%	David Valadao
22nd	42%	57%	Devin Nunes
23rd	36%	62%	Kevin McCarthy
24th	54%	43%	Lois Capps
25th	48%	50%	Buck McKeon
26th	54%	44%	Julia Brownley
27th	63%	35%	Judy Chu
28th	70%	27%	Adam Schiff
29th	77%	21%	Tony Cárdenas
30th	65%	32%	Brad Sherman
31st	57%	41%	Gary Miller
32nd	65%	32%	Grace Napolitano
33rd	61%	37%	Henry Waxman
34th	83%	14%	Xavier Becerra
35th	67%	31%	Gloria Negrete McLeod
36th	51%	48%	Raul Ruiz
37th	85%	13%	Karen Bass
38th	65%	33%	Linda Sánchez
39th	47%	51%	Ed Royce
40th	81%	17%	Lucille Roybal-Allard
41st	62%	36%	Mark Takano
42nd	41%	57%	Ken Calvert
43rd	78%	20%	Maxine Waters
44th	85%	14%	Janice Hahn
45th	43%	55%	John B. T. Campbell III
46th	61%	36%	Loretta Sánchez
47th	60%	37%	Alan Lowenthal
48th	43%	55%	Dana Rohrabacher
49th	46%	52%	Darrell Issa
50th	38%	60%	Duncan Hunter
51st	69%	29%	Juan Vargas
52nd	52%	46%	Scott Peters
53rd	61%	36%	Susan Davis

==== By city ====
Official winners by city.

By municipality

Official outcome by city and unincorporated areas of counties, of which Obama won 347 and Romney won 192
City	County	Barack Obama Democratic		Mitt Romney Republican		Various candidates Other parties		Margin		Total votes	2008 to 2012 Swing %
City	County	#	%	#	%	#	%	#	%	Total votes	2008 to 2012 Swing %
Alameda	Alameda	26,954	78.65%	6,339	18.50%	979	2.86%	20,615	60.15%	34,272	3.32%
Albany	Alameda	7,447	88.06%	712	8.42%	298	3.52%	6,735	79.64%	8,457	0.77%
Berkeley	Alameda	54,163	90.31%	2,766	4.61%	3,045	5.08%	51,397	85.70%	59,974	-1.89%
Dublin	Alameda	11,016	65.15%	5,484	32.43%	409	2.42%	5,532	32.72%	16,909	-0.96%
Emeryville	Alameda	3,894	87.25%	409	9.16%	160	3.59%	3,485	78.09%	4,463	-2.80%
Fremont	Alameda	51,403	72.75%	17,754	25.13%	1,501	2.12%	33,649	47.62%	70,658	3.64%
Hayward	Alameda	33,536	80.81%	7,149	17.23%	814	1.96%	26,387	63.58%	41,499	5.91%
Livermore	Alameda	20,088	54.89%	15,562	42.52%	945	2.58%	4,526	12.37%	36,595	-4.01%
Newark	Alameda	10,635	74.44%	3,339	23.37%	312	2.18%	7,296	51.07%	14,286	4.17%
Oakland	Alameda	146,454	90.58%	9,745	6.03%	5,489	3.39%	136,709	84.55%	161,688	0.32%
Piedmont	Alameda	5,230	74.81%	1,636	23.40%	125	1.79%	3,594	51.41%	6,991	-6.10%
Pleasanton	Alameda	19,175	57.92%	13,240	39.99%	691	2.09%	5,935	17.93%	33,106	-4.08%
San Leandro	Alameda	23,587	78.55%	5,802	19.32%	639	2.13%	17,785	59.23%	30,028	6.38%
Union City	Alameda	18,106	79.21%	4,375	19.14%	376	1.65%	13,731	60.07%	22,857	6.21%
Unincorporated area	Alameda	37,996	71.48%	13,870	26.09%	1,292	2.43%	24,126	45.39%	53,158	2.84%
Unincorporated area	Alpine	389	60.12%	236	36.48%	22	3.40%	153	23.65%	647	-0.95%
Amador City	Amador	58	52.25%	50	45.05%	3	2.70%	8	7.21%	111	-6.24%
Ione	Amador	601	32.38%	1,211	65.25%	44	2.37%	-610	-32.87%	1,856	-5.26%
Jackson	Amador	843	41.77%	1,114	55.20%	61	3.02%	-271	-13.43%	2,018	-3.53%
Plymouth	Amador	140	35.71%	225	57.40%	27	6.89%	-85	-21.68%	392	1.98%
Sutter Creek	Amador	620	44.90%	734	53.15%	27	1.96%	-114	-8.25%	1,381	-9.02%
Unincorporated area	Amador	4,568	38.59%	6,947	58.69%	322	2.72%	-2,379	-20.10%	11,837	-4.74%
Biggs	Butte	223	43.73%	275	53.92%	12	2.35%	-52	-10.20%	510	6.16%
Chico	Butte	20,215	57.78%	13,419	38.36%	1,350	3.86%	6,796	19.43%	34,984	-5.84%
Gridley	Butte	863	46.27%	931	49.92%	71	3.81%	-68	-3.65%	1,865	-2.14%
Oroville	Butte	1,870	44.25%	2,203	52.13%	153	3.62%	-333	-7.88%	4,226	-3.38%
Paradise	Butte	5,265	41.83%	6,913	54.92%	409	3.25%	-1,648	-13.09%	12,587	-4.19%
Unincorporated area	Butte	14,233	39.35%	20,738	57.34%	1,195	3.30%	-6,505	-17.99%	36,166	-2.82%
Angels	Calaveras (Note: From California's Supplement to the Statement of Vote: "Calaveras County changed its Final Official Canvass, which is why the numbers for President, United States Senator, and state ballot measures in the December 14, 2012, Statement of Vote do not match the numbers in this Supplement to the Statement of Vote. The changes did not affect any election outcomes." This explains why Mitt Romney's Calaveras county and statewide totals are 2 votes less than results elsewhere in this article.)	730	41.43%	978	55.51%	54	3.06%	-248	-14.07%	1,762	-3.62%
Unincorporated area	Calaveras	7,940	39.84%	11,385	57.12%	605	3.04%	-3,445	-17.29%	19,930	-4.06%
Colusa	Colusa	704	39.73%	1,042	58.80%	26	1.47%	-338	-19.07%	1,772	-3.77%
Williams	Colusa	503	59.81%	329	39.12%	9	1.07%	174	20.69%	841	3.38%
Unincorporated area	Colusa	1,107	32.55%	2,230	65.57%	64	1.88%	-1,123	-33.02%	3,401	-4.72%
Antioch	Contra Costa	24,105	70.82%	9,262	27.21%	671	1.97%	14,843	43.61%	34,038	4.21%
Brentwood	Contra Costa	11,415	54.13%	9,232	43.78%	442	2.10%	2,183	10.35%	21,089	-5.10%
Clayton	Contra Costa	3,210	50.54%	3,020	47.55%	121	1.91%	190	2.99%	6,351	-8.60%
Concord	Contra Costa	30,475	65.73%	14,621	31.53%	1,269	2.74%	15,854	34.19%	46,365	-0.82%
Danville	Contra Costa	11,870	49.86%	11,521	48.40%	414	1.74%	349	1.47%	23,805	-10.09%
El Cerrito	Contra Costa	10,496	85.22%	1,391	11.29%	429	3.48%	9,105	73.93%	12,316	1.18%
Hercules	Contra Costa	7,929	79.25%	1,901	19.00%	175	1.75%	6,028	60.25%	10,005	4.47%
Lafayette	Contra Costa	9,001	61.96%	5,174	35.62%	351	2.42%	3,827	26.35%	14,526	-10.53%
Martinez	Contra Costa	11,641	65.76%	5,527	31.22%	534	3.02%	6,114	34.54%	17,702	-3.91%
Moraga	Contra Costa	5,244	58.72%	3,487	39.04%	200	2.24%	1,757	19.67%	8,931	-7.99%
Oakley	Contra Costa	7,195	60.44%	4,381	36.80%	329	2.76%	2,814	23.64%	11,905	-0.53%
Orinda	Contra Costa	7,158	62.78%	3,958	34.71%	286	2.51%	3,200	28.07%	11,402	-8.58%
Pinole	Contra Costa	6,027	74.01%	1,935	23.76%	181	2.22%	4,092	50.25%	8,143	4.02%
Pittsburg	Contra Costa	15,681	79.91%	3,598	18.34%	344	1.75%	12,083	61.58%	19,623	5.23%
Pleasant Hill	Contra Costa	10,746	66.59%	4,868	30.16%	524	3.25%	5,878	36.42%	16,138	-4.68%
Richmond	Contra Costa	29,912	88.79%	3,025	8.98%	753	2.24%	26,887	79.81%	33,690	2.39%
San Pablo	Contra Costa	5,365	87.97%	623	10.21%	111	1.82%	4,742	77.75%	6,099	3.85%
San Ramon	Contra Costa	17,410	60.08%	11,028	38.06%	540	1.86%	6,382	22.02%	28,978	-4.05%
Walnut Creek	Contra Costa	22,918	62.96%	12,718	34.94%	766	2.10%	10,200	28.02%	36,402	-4.45%
Unincorporated area	Contra Costa	43,026	61.45%	25,247	36.06%	1,745	2.49%	17,779	25.39%	70,018	-4.93%
Crescent City	Del Norte	581	52.72%	457	41.47%	64	5.81%	124	11.25%	1,102	-0.43%
Unincorporated area	Del Norte	3,210	42.05%	4,157	54.45%	267	3.50%	-947	-12.41%	7,634	-2.95%
Placerville	El Dorado	1,944	47.04%	2,068	50.04%	121	2.93%	-124	-3.00%	4,133	-4.80%
South Lake Tahoe	El Dorado	3,991	65.73%	1,871	30.81%	210	3.46%	2,120	34.91%	6,072	-3.84%
Unincorporated area	El Dorado	29,181	37.31%	47,018	60.12%	2,003	2.56%	-17,837	-22.81%	78,202	-7.35%
Unallocated overseas votes (Note: From California's Supplement to the Statement of Vote: El Dorado County created a ballot type for Overseas Federal Only voters. These votes for President and United States Senator are not included in the county vote totals by Supervisorial Districts, Senate Districts, Assembly Districts, and Board of Equalization Districts. Instead, the votes are referenced as having no matching districts.)	El Dorado	50	73.53%	16	23.53%	2	2.94%	34	50.00%	68	N/A
Clovis	Fresno	14,237	37.15%	23,388	61.03%	695	1.81%	-9,151	-23.88%	38,320	-3.54%
Coalinga	Fresno	1,194	43.93%	1,469	54.05%	55	2.02%	-275	-10.12%	2,718	0.67%
Firebaugh	Fresno	782	67.07%	366	31.39%	18	1.54%	416	35.68%	1,166	-1.64%
Fowler	Fresno	932	56.28%	697	42.09%	27	1.63%	235	14.19%	1,656	6.35%
Fresno	Fresno	73,578	56.80%	53,563	41.35%	2,397	1.85%	20,015	15.45%	129,538	0.31%
Huron	Fresno	482	89.59%	46	8.55%	10	1.86%	436	81.04%	538	7.40%
Kerman	Fresno	1,721	60.36%	1,099	38.55%	31	1.09%	622	21.82%	2,851	7.42%
Kingsburg	Fresno	1,205	28.13%	2,982	69.61%	97	2.26%	-1,777	-41.48%	4,284	-5.86%
Mendota	Fresno	910	83.79%	159	14.64%	17	1.57%	751	69.15%	1,086	16.02%
Orange Cove	Fresno	1,192	82.61%	237	16.42%	14	0.97%	955	66.18%	1,443	10.42%
Parlier	Fresno	1,606	86.34%	231	12.42%	23	1.24%	1,375	73.92%	1,860	14.47%
Reedley	Fresno	2,704	48.80%	2,745	49.54%	92	1.66%	-41	-0.74%	5,541	0.32%
San Joaquin	Fresno	308	82.13%	64	17.07%	3	0.80%	244	65.07%	375	6.32%
Sanger	Fresno	3,815	64.01%	2,061	34.58%	84	1.41%	1,754	29.43%	5,960	5.02%
Selma	Fresno	2,986	59.76%	1,945	38.92%	66	1.32%	1,041	20.83%	4,997	8.14%
Unincorporated area	Fresno	21,477	38.36%	33,438	59.73%	1,066	1.90%	-11,961	-21.37%	55,981	-2.39%
Orland	Glenn	935	44.65%	1,096	52.34%	63	3.01%	-161	-7.69%	2,094	1.62%
Willows	Glenn	691	36.72%	1,116	59.30%	75	3.99%	-425	-22.58%	1,882	-2.80%
Unincorporated area	Glenn	1,675	32.12%	3,420	65.58%	120	2.30%	-1,745	-33.46%	5,215	-5.70%
Arcata	Humboldt	6,516	76.12%	1,078	12.59%	966	11.29%	5,438	63.53%	8,560	-4.95%
Blue Lake	Humboldt	409	64.72%	171	27.06%	52	8.23%	238	37.66%	632	-1.44%
Eureka	Humboldt	6,284	62.43%	3,161	31.41%	620	6.16%	3,123	31.03%	10,065	1.43%
Ferndale	Humboldt	410	52.84%	342	44.07%	24	3.09%	68	8.76%	776	-0.50%
Fortuna	Humboldt	2,085	45.93%	2,306	50.79%	149	3.28%	-221	-4.87%	4,540	2.29%
Rio Dell	Humboldt	508	46.31%	546	49.77%	43	3.92%	-38	-3.46%	1,097	1.47%
Trinidad	Humboldt	167	75.57%	42	19.00%	12	5.43%	125	56.56%	221	3.52%
Unincorporated area	Humboldt	18,078	57.79%	11,179	35.74%	2,024	6.47%	6,899	22.05%	31,281	-1.14%
Brawley	Imperial	3,712	61.62%	2,221	36.87%	91	1.51%	1,491	24.75%	6,024	5.00%
Calexico	Imperial	7,150	85.73%	1,087	13.03%	103	1.24%	6,063	72.70%	8,340	5.76%
Calipatria	Imperial	447	68.14%	204	31.10%	5	0.76%	243	37.04%	656	9.36%
El Centro	Imperial	6,789	64.71%	3,530	33.65%	172	1.64%	3,259	31.06%	10,491	5.84%
Holtville	Imperial	797	59.39%	515	38.38%	30	2.24%	282	21.01%	1,342	10.82%
Imperial	Imperial	2,169	53.79%	1,777	44.07%	86	2.13%	392	9.72%	4,032	-0.20%
Westmorland	Imperial	284	64.99%	148	33.87%	5	1.14%	136	31.12%	437	2.77%
Unincorporated area	Imperial	3,788	52.53%	3,295	45.69%	128	1.78%	493	6.84%	7,211	7.78%
Bishop	Inyo	617	47.17%	648	49.54%	43	3.29%	-31	-2.37%	1,308	-5.54%
Unincorporated area	Inyo	2,805	41.89%	3,692	55.14%	199	2.97%	-887	-13.25%	6,696	-1.61%
Arvin	Kern	1,586	78.94%	394	19.61%	29	1.44%	1,192	59.33%	2,009	14.25%
Bakersfield	Kern	44,141	42.79%	57,084	55.34%	1,925	1.87%	-12,943	-12.55%	103,150	0.13%
California City	Kern	1,508	41.27%	2,019	55.25%	127	3.48%	-511	-13.98%	3,654	5.32%
Delano	Kern	4,738	75.58%	1,436	22.91%	95	1.52%	3,302	52.67%	6,269	11.92%
Maricopa	Kern	61	21.33%	211	73.78%	14	4.90%	-150	-52.45%	286	5.38%
McFarland	Kern	1,142	75.98%	342	22.75%	19	1.26%	800	53.23%	1,503	8.72%
Ridgecrest	Kern	3,043	29.98%	6,729	66.30%	378	3.72%	-3,686	-36.32%	10,150	-2.77%
Shafter	Kern	1,528	53.45%	1,282	44.84%	49	1.71%	246	8.60%	2,859	7.50%
Taft	Kern	446	22.71%	1,480	75.36%	38	1.93%	-1,034	-52.65%	1,964	-0.33%
Tehachapi	Kern	939	31.57%	1,945	65.40%	90	3.03%	-1,006	-33.83%	2,974	-3.72%
Wasco	Kern	1,845	59.77%	1,185	38.39%	57	1.85%	660	21.38%	3,087	9.76%
Unincorporated area	Kern	28,518	34.31%	52,511	63.18%	2,079	2.50%	-23,993	-28.87%	83,108	0.38%
Avenal	Kings	630	70.95%	232	26.13%	26	2.93%	398	44.82%	888	10.51%
Corcoran	Kings	1,477	63.66%	791	34.09%	52	2.24%	686	29.57%	2,320	13.40%
Hanford	Kings	5,895	40.74%	8,255	57.05%	319	2.20%	-2,360	-16.31%	14,469	-2.12%
Lemoore	Kings	2,390	39.48%	3,525	58.24%	138	2.28%	-1,135	-18.75%	6,053	-1.01%
Unincorporated area	Kings	2,587	33.95%	4,868	63.88%	166	2.18%	-2,281	-29.93%	7,621	-3.66%
Clearlake	Lake	2,420	64.14%	1,188	31.49%	165	4.37%	1,232	32.65%	3,773	1.17%
Lakeport	Lake	1,051	55.67%	775	41.05%	62	3.28%	276	14.62%	1,888	-2.91%
Unincorporated area	Lake	9,692	54.89%	7,237	40.99%	728	4.12%	2,455	13.90%	17,657	-3.02%
Susanville	Lassen	1,089	32.03%	2,200	64.71%	111	3.26%	-1,111	-32.68%	3,400	-4.68%
Unincorporated area	Lassen	1,964	27.10%	5,096	70.32%	187	2.58%	-3,132	-43.22%	7,247	-5.79%
Agoura Hills	Los Angeles	5,789	53.05%	4,869	44.62%	254	2.33%	920	8.43%	10,912	-9.81%
Alhambra	Los Angeles	16,968	71.47%	6,257	26.36%	515	2.17%	10,711	45.12%	23,740	9.04%
Arcadia	Los Angeles	9,434	49.47%	9,219	48.34%	418	2.19%	215	1.13%	19,071	0.31%
Artesia	Los Angeles	2,714	63.99%	1,464	34.52%	63	1.49%	1,250	29.47%	4,241	5.48%
Avalon	Los Angeles	650	56.42%	471	40.89%	31	2.69%	179	15.54%	1,152	4.44%
Azusa	Los Angeles	7,670	66.13%	3,633	31.32%	295	2.54%	4,037	34.81%	11,598	5.05%
Baldwin Park	Los Angeles	13,142	79.64%	2,977	18.04%	382	2.32%	10,165	61.60%	16,501	7.90%
Bell	Los Angeles	5,490	84.58%	846	13.03%	155	2.39%	4,644	71.55%	6,491	6.27%
Bell Gardens	Los Angeles	6,015	87.14%	769	11.14%	119	1.72%	5,246	76.00%	6,903	6.48%
Bellflower	Los Angeles	14,217	68.13%	6,205	29.73%	446	2.14%	8,012	38.39%	20,868	6.74%
Beverly Hills	Los Angeles	8,263	54.28%	6,676	43.85%	284	1.87%	1,587	10.43%	15,223	-9.92%
Bradbury	Los Angeles	172	40.38%	245	57.51%	9	2.11%	-73	-17.14%	426	-3.25%
Burbank	Los Angeles	27,564	64.01%	14,198	32.97%	1,299	3.02%	13,366	31.04%	43,061	-0.37%
Calabasas	Los Angeles	6,402	54.81%	5,047	43.21%	232	1.99%	1,355	11.60%	11,681	-12.88%
Carson	Los Angeles	28,288	80.37%	6,403	18.19%	506	1.44%	21,885	62.18%	35,197	8.26%
Cerritos	Los Angeles	12,177	57.90%	8,525	40.54%	329	1.56%	3,652	17.36%	21,031	3.89%
Claremont	Los Angeles	10,332	61.85%	5,928	35.49%	444	2.66%	4,404	26.36%	16,704	-2.64%
Commerce	Los Angeles	3,249	84.43%	529	13.75%	70	1.82%	2,720	70.69%	3,848	8.61%
Compton	Los Angeles	23,948	95.53%	879	3.51%	242	0.97%	23,069	92.02%	25,069	1.47%
Covina	Los Angeles	9,732	57.64%	6,758	40.03%	393	2.33%	2,974	17.62%	16,883	4.41%
Cudahy	Los Angeles	3,139	85.81%	457	12.49%	62	1.69%	2,682	73.32%	3,658	5.29%
Culver City	Los Angeles	15,812	77.44%	3,979	19.49%	627	3.07%	11,833	57.95%	20,418	0.61%
Diamond Bar	Los Angeles	11,186	54.81%	8,828	43.26%	393	1.93%	2,358	11.55%	20,407	-0.15%
Downey	Los Angeles	22,766	65.51%	11,245	32.36%	742	2.14%	11,521	33.15%	34,753	8.36%
Duarte	Los Angeles	5,206	65.07%	2,575	32.18%	220	2.75%	2,631	32.88%	8,001	1.88%
El Monte	Los Angeles	15,630	78.55%	3,836	19.28%	432	2.17%	11,794	59.27%	19,898	14.09%
El Segundo	Los Angeles	4,274	49.89%	3,999	46.68%	293	3.42%	275	3.21%	8,566	-2.21%
Gardena	Los Angeles	15,680	80.16%	3,535	18.07%	347	1.77%	12,145	62.08%	19,562	8.68%
Glendale	Los Angeles	38,664	64.34%	19,705	32.79%	1,724	2.87%	18,959	31.55%	60,093	-0.57%
Glendora	Los Angeles	9,368	41.42%	12,654	55.95%	596	2.64%	-3,286	-14.53%	22,618	-2.90%
Hawaiian Gardens	Los Angeles	1,912	75.16%	578	22.72%	54	2.12%	1,334	52.44%	2,544	10.83%
Hawthorne	Los Angeles	18,967	81.82%	3,782	16.31%	433	1.87%	15,185	65.50%	23,182	4.93%
Hermosa Beach	Los Angeles	5,797	55.62%	4,250	40.78%	376	3.61%	1,547	14.84%	10,423	-11.10%
Hidden Hills	Los Angeles	483	43.24%	615	55.06%	19	1.70%	-132	-11.82%	1,117	-13.91%
Huntington Park	Los Angeles	8,653	86.83%	1,101	11.05%	211	2.12%	7,552	75.79%	9,965	7.80%
Industry	Los Angeles	16	28.07%	40	70.18%	1	1.75%	-24	-42.11%	57	-5.07%
Inglewood	Los Angeles	34,795	93.82%	1,877	5.06%	415	1.12%	32,918	88.76%	37,087	1.93%
Irwindale	Los Angeles	450	75.76%	130	21.89%	14	2.36%	320	53.87%	594	10.81%
La Canada Flintridge	Los Angeles	5,061	44.65%	6,072	53.57%	201	1.77%	-1,011	-8.92%	11,334	-8.98%
La Habra Heights	Los Angeles	940	32.95%	1,841	64.53%	72	2.52%	-901	-31.58%	2,853	-6.65%
La Mirada	Los Angeles	9,251	48.98%	9,220	48.81%	417	2.21%	31	0.16%	18,888	2.75%
La Puente	Los Angeles	7,387	78.91%	1,781	19.03%	193	2.06%	5,606	59.89%	9,361	9.06%
La Verne	Los Angeles	6,845	45.20%	7,931	52.37%	368	2.43%	-1,086	-7.17%	15,144	-2.74%
Lakewood	Los Angeles	18,981	56.34%	13,846	41.10%	861	2.56%	5,135	15.24%	33,688	2.93%
Lancaster	Los Angeles	24,097	52.39%	20,723	45.06%	1,173	2.55%	3,374	7.34%	45,993	3.74%
Lawndale	Los Angeles	6,197	74.53%	1,878	22.59%	240	2.89%	4,319	51.94%	8,315	8.44%
Lomita	Los Angeles	4,352	55.43%	3,272	41.67%	228	2.90%	1,080	13.75%	7,852	2.61%
Long Beach	Los Angeles	107,733	69.88%	42,476	27.55%	3,961	2.57%	65,257	42.33%	154,170	1.28%
Los Angeles	Los Angeles	902,038	76.39%	248,182	21.02%	30,625	2.59%	653,856	55.37%	1,180,845	0.85%
Lynwood	Los Angeles	12,564	89.69%	1,155	8.24%	290	2.07%	11,409	81.44%	14,009	4.44%
Malibu	Los Angeles	4,086	57.64%	2,828	39.89%	175	2.47%	1,258	17.75%	7,089	-12.31%
Manhattan Beach	Los Angeles	10,013	50.32%	9,477	47.63%	409	2.06%	536	2.69%	19,899	-12.39%
Maywood	Los Angeles	4,322	87.90%	502	10.21%	93	1.89%	3,820	77.69%	4,917	5.64%
Monrovia	Los Angeles	8,871	59.63%	5,580	37.51%	425	2.86%	3,291	22.12%	14,876	0.16%
Montebello	Los Angeles	13,972	76.99%	3,788	20.87%	387	2.13%	10,184	56.12%	18,147	6.64%
Monterey Park	Los Angeles	11,521	69.76%	4,664	28.24%	330	2.00%	6,857	41.52%	16,515	10.60%
Norwalk	Los Angeles	20,905	72.53%	7,281	25.26%	638	2.21%	13,624	47.27%	28,824	10.09%
Palmdale	Los Angeles	25,648	59.79%	16,208	37.79%	1,038	2.42%	9,440	22.01%	42,894	3.64%
Palos Verdes Estates	Los Angeles	2,976	36.82%	4,986	61.69%	121	1.50%	-2,010	-24.87%	8,083	-12.71%
Paramount	Los Angeles	9,344	83.70%	1,588	14.22%	232	2.08%	7,756	69.47%	11,164	6.06%
Pasadena	Los Angeles	40,441	70.78%	15,099	26.43%	1,598	2.80%	25,342	44.35%	57,138	-1.51%
Pico Rivera	Los Angeles	15,935	79.53%	3,725	18.59%	376	1.88%	12,210	60.94%	20,036	7.83%
Pomona	Los Angeles	25,017	73.94%	8,038	23.76%	781	2.31%	16,979	50.18%	33,836	3.93%
Rancho Palos Verdes	Los Angeles	9,629	44.82%	11,396	53.05%	457	2.13%	-1,767	-8.23%	21,482	-5.42%
Redondo Beach	Los Angeles	18,718	56.89%	13,148	39.96%	1,037	3.15%	5,570	16.93%	32,903	-5.11%
Rolling Hills	Los Angeles	311	26.60%	838	71.69%	20	1.71%	-527	-45.08%	1,169	-13.97%
Rolling Hills Estates	Los Angeles	1,788	38.85%	2,708	58.84%	106	2.30%	-920	-19.99%	4,602	-7.33%
Rosemead	Los Angeles	8,389	76.10%	2,450	22.23%	184	1.67%	5,939	53.88%	11,023	17.02%
San Dimas	Los Angeles	6,857	45.38%	7,944	52.57%	309	2.05%	-1,087	-7.19%	15,110	-3.15%
San Fernando	Los Angeles	4,670	79.64%	1,063	18.13%	131	2.23%	3,607	61.51%	5,864	4.56%
San Gabriel	Los Angeles	6,567	65.31%	3,265	32.47%	223	2.22%	3,302	32.84%	10,055	7.61%
San Marino	Los Angeles	2,480	40.39%	3,561	58.00%	99	1.61%	-1,081	-17.61%	6,140	-7.91%
Santa Clarita	Los Angeles	32,789	45.10%	38,033	52.32%	1,874	2.58%	-5,244	-7.21%	72,696	-4.47%
Santa Fe Springs	Los Angeles	4,141	71.48%	1,531	26.43%	121	2.09%	2,610	45.05%	5,793	5.18%
Santa Monica	Los Angeles	36,000	76.24%	9,776	20.70%	1,445	3.06%	26,224	55.53%	47,221	-4.97%
Sierra Madre	Los Angeles	3,505	54.49%	2,719	42.27%	208	3.23%	786	12.22%	6,432	-2.46%
Signal Hill	Los Angeles	2,799	70.45%	1,090	27.44%	84	2.11%	1,709	43.02%	3,973	2.63%
South El Monte	Los Angeles	3,425	82.35%	631	15.17%	103	2.48%	2,794	67.18%	4,159	10.05%
South Gate	Los Angeles	18,077	84.59%	2,890	13.52%	404	1.89%	15,187	71.06%	21,371	7.86%
South Pasadena	Los Angeles	8,578	68.71%	3,546	28.40%	360	2.88%	5,032	40.31%	12,484	0.23%
Temple City	Los Angeles	6,596	58.07%	4,525	39.84%	238	2.10%	2,071	18.23%	11,359	6.33%
Torrance	Los Angeles	30,800	52.05%	26,813	45.31%	1,565	2.64%	3,987	6.74%	59,178	1.09%
Vernon	Los Angeles	19	48.72%	17	43.59%	3	7.69%	2	5.13%	39	19.02%
Walnut	Los Angeles	6,757	57.82%	4,686	40.10%	243	2.08%	2,071	17.72%	11,686	3.49%
West Covina	Los Angeles	22,136	64.66%	11,310	33.04%	789	2.30%	10,826	31.62%	34,235	5.37%
West Hollywood	Los Angeles	15,366	81.44%	2,945	15.61%	556	2.95%	12,421	65.83%	18,867	-1.72%
Westlake Village	Los Angeles	2,242	46.13%	2,531	52.08%	87	1.79%	-289	-5.95%	4,860	-12.09%
Whittier	Los Angeles	18,227	57.61%	12,659	40.01%	750	2.37%	5,568	17.60%	31,636	3.34%
Unincorporated area	Los Angeles	222,526	68.29%	96,033	29.47%	7,305	2.24%	126,493	38.82%	325,864	2.21%
Chowchilla	Madera	1,119	37.61%	1,793	60.27%	63	2.12%	-674	-22.66%	2,975	-2.73%
Madera	Madera	6,196	54.96%	4,855	43.07%	222	1.97%	1,341	11.90%	11,273	-0.71%
Unincorporated area	Madera	8,703	34.11%	16,204	63.51%	606	2.38%	-7,501	-29.40%	25,513	-6.55%
Belvedere	Marin	745	54.98%	593	43.76%	17	1.25%	152	11.22%	1,355	-21.86%
Corte Madera	Marin	4,090	77.49%	1,070	20.27%	118	2.24%	3,020	57.22%	5,278	-4.72%
Fairfax	Marin	4,097	85.30%	455	9.47%	251	5.23%	3,642	75.83%	4,803	-3.79%
Larkspur	Marin	5,461	75.37%	1,630	22.50%	155	2.14%	3,831	52.87%	7,246	-6.70%
Mill Valley	Marin	7,089	81.55%	1,417	16.30%	187	2.15%	5,672	65.25%	8,693	-8.41%
Novato	Marin	17,392	68.48%	7,389	29.09%	617	2.43%	10,003	39.38%	25,398	-3.68%
Ross	Marin	823	57.07%	594	41.19%	25	1.73%	229	15.88%	1,442	-27.58%
San Anselmo	Marin	6,317	83.10%	1,099	14.46%	186	2.45%	5,218	68.64%	7,602	-4.80%
San Rafael	Marin	19,175	75.16%	5,672	22.23%	664	2.60%	13,503	52.93%	25,511	-4.80%
Sausalito	Marin	3,535	76.10%	1,001	21.55%	109	2.35%	2,534	54.55%	4,645	-9.49%
Tiburon	Marin	3,401	64.18%	1,803	34.03%	95	1.79%	1,598	30.16%	5,299	-16.30%
Unincorporated area	Marin	27,771	75.10%	8,157	22.06%	1,049	2.84%	19,614	53.04%	36,977	-6.44%
Unincorporated area	Mariposa	3,498	38.98%	5,140	57.28%	335	3.73%	-1,642	-18.30%	8,973	-5.84%
Fort Bragg	Mendocino	1,677	71.82%	554	23.73%	104	4.45%	1,123	48.09%	2,335	-3.19%
Point Arena	Mendocino	148	81.32%	21	11.54%	13	7.14%	127	69.78%	182	-10.95%
Ukiah	Mendocino	3,546	66.42%	1,551	29.05%	242	4.53%	1,995	37.37%	5,339	-1.00%
Willits	Mendocino	1,103	68.21%	421	26.04%	93	5.75%	682	42.18%	1,617	1.31%
Unincorporated area	Mendocino	16,719	65.96%	7,111	28.05%	1,517	5.98%	9,608	37.91%	25,347	-4.99%
Atwater	Merced	3,530	48.99%	3,502	48.60%	174	2.41%	28	0.39%	7,206	-1.61%
Dos Palos	Merced	536	47.60%	566	50.27%	24	2.13%	-30	-2.66%	1,126	-2.74%
Gustine	Merced	750	52.41%	652	45.56%	29	2.03%	98	6.85%	1,431	-3.70%
Livingston	Merced	2,057	81.11%	436	17.19%	43	1.70%	1,621	63.92%	2,536	3.18%
Los Banos	Merced	5,049	61.00%	3,062	36.99%	166	2.01%	1,987	24.01%	8,277	-0.37%
Merced	Merced	11,386	57.97%	7,775	39.59%	479	2.44%	3,611	18.39%	19,640	1.94%
Unincorporated area	Merced	9,697	44.68%	11,588	53.39%	420	1.94%	-1,891	-8.71%	21,705	-1.12%
Alturas	Modoc	360	33.68%	688	64.36%	21	1.96%	-328	-30.68%	1,069	-6.08%
Unincorporated area	Modoc	751	25.78%	2,089	71.71%	73	2.51%	-1,338	-45.93%	2,913	-2.58%
Mammoth Lakes	Mono	1,510	61.38%	881	35.81%	69	2.80%	629	25.57%	2,460	-4.79%
Unincorporated area	Mono	1,223	45.16%	1,404	51.85%	81	2.99%	-181	-6.68%	2,708	-3.48%
Carmel-by-the-Sea	Monterey	1,437	60.66%	879	37.10%	53	2.24%	558	23.55%	2,369	-9.38%
Del Rey Oaks	Monterey	599	65.61%	281	30.78%	33	3.61%	318	34.83%	913	-4.78%
Gonzales	Monterey	1,402	81.04%	301	17.40%	27	1.56%	1,101	63.64%	1,730	5.48%
Greenfield	Monterey	2,243	82.83%	418	15.44%	47	1.74%	1,825	67.39%	2,708	4.41%
King City	Monterey	1,284	69.59%	532	28.83%	29	1.57%	752	40.76%	1,845	4.45%
Marina	Monterey	4,582	69.34%	1,853	28.04%	173	2.62%	2,729	41.30%	6,608	2.22%
Monterey	Monterey	7,436	68.12%	3,139	28.76%	341	3.12%	4,297	39.36%	10,916	-4.61%
Pacific Grove	Monterey	5,570	70.07%	2,126	26.75%	253	3.18%	3,444	43.33%	7,949	-7.75%
Salinas	Monterey	24,875	73.16%	8,417	24.76%	707	2.08%	16,458	48.41%	33,999	3.92%
Sand City	Monterey	69	59.48%	38	32.76%	9	7.76%	31	26.72%	116	-9.20%
Seaside	Monterey	6,406	75.53%	1,873	22.08%	202	2.38%	4,533	53.45%	8,481	0.65%
Soledad	Monterey	2,506	81.90%	497	16.24%	57	1.86%	2,009	65.65%	3,060	5.69%
Unincorporated area	Monterey	24,509	57.57%	17,035	40.01%	1,028	2.41%	7,474	17.56%	42,572	-5.87%
Unallocated write-ins (Note: From California's Supplement to the Statement of Vote: Monterey County received write-in votes for Barack Obama, Mitt Romney, and Gary Johnson that were counted separately and added to the county vote totals. These votes for president are consolidated into a line item called Multiple Districts in the sections for Supervisorial Districts, Senate Districts, Assembly Districts, and Political Districts within Counties.)	Monterey	2	50.00%	1	25.00%	1	25.00%	1	25.00%	4	N/A
American Canyon	Napa	4,778	71.14%	1,791	26.67%	147	2.19%	2,987	44.48%	6,716	4.82%
Calistoga	Napa	1,353	71.32%	501	26.41%	43	2.27%	852	44.91%	1,897	-1.94%
Napa	Napa	19,909	64.36%	10,208	33.00%	816	2.64%	9,701	31.36%	30,933	-3.86%
St. Helena	Napa	1,831	65.30%	921	32.85%	52	1.85%	910	32.45%	2,804	-8.79%
Yountville	Napa	1,061	64.30%	560	33.94%	29	1.76%	501	30.36%	1,650	-3.81%
Unincorporated area	Napa	6,938	53.98%	5,545	43.14%	370	2.88%	1,393	10.84%	12,853	-8.24%
Grass Valley	Nevada	2,739	53.30%	2,199	42.79%	201	3.91%	540	10.51%	5,139	-2.30%
Nevada City	Nevada	1,226	68.57%	468	26.17%	94	5.26%	758	42.39%	1,788	-1.33%
Truckee	Nevada	4,342	63.38%	2,294	33.48%	215	3.14%	2,048	29.89%	6,851	-6.91%
Unincorporated area	Nevada	16,356	43.46%	20,025	53.21%	1,251	3.32%	-3,669	-9.75%	37,632	-6.42%
Aliso Viejo	Orange	9,430	47.39%	9,991	50.21%	478	2.40%	-561	-2.82%	19,899	-9.95%
Anaheim	Orange	47,662	52.84%	40,517	44.92%	2,017	2.24%	7,145	7.92%	90,196	3.03%
Brea	Orange	7,197	39.74%	10,504	58.00%	408	2.25%	-3,307	-18.26%	18,109	-3.67%
Buena Park	Orange	13,022	54.16%	10,459	43.50%	561	2.33%	2,563	10.66%	24,042	2.34%
Costa Mesa	Orange	18,414	47.84%	18,778	48.78%	1,300	3.38%	-364	-0.95%	38,492	-7.54%
Cypress	Orange	9,263	46.25%	10,323	51.54%	444	2.22%	-1,060	-5.29%	20,030	-1.11%
Dana Point	Orange	6,917	39.95%	10,029	57.93%	366	2.11%	-3,112	-17.98%	17,312	-13.04%
Fountain Valley	Orange	10,679	41.92%	14,219	55.82%	577	2.26%	-3,540	-13.90%	25,475	-0.44%
Fullerton	Orange	22,960	48.08%	23,526	49.26%	1,271	2.66%	-566	-1.19%	47,757	-0.76%
Garden Grove	Orange	25,786	53.63%	21,213	44.12%	1,078	2.24%	4,573	9.51%	48,077	13.82%
Huntington Beach	Orange	37,093	40.98%	51,166	56.53%	2,255	2.49%	-14,073	-15.55%	90,514	-8.21%
Irvine	Orange	43,954	53.69%	35,866	43.81%	2,041	2.49%	8,088	9.88%	81,861	-6.77%
La Habra	Orange	9,149	49.52%	8,926	48.32%	399	2.16%	223	1.21%	18,474	0.43%
La Palma	Orange	3,135	49.34%	3,103	48.84%	116	1.83%	32	0.50%	6,354	1.68%
Laguna Beach	Orange	7,669	54.92%	5,998	42.95%	298	2.13%	1,671	11.97%	13,965	-15.22%
Laguna Hills	Orange	5,755	40.78%	8,083	57.28%	274	1.94%	-2,328	-16.50%	14,112	-7.91%
Laguna Niguel	Orange	12,832	40.48%	18,321	57.79%	550	1.73%	-5,489	-17.31%	31,703	-11.40%
Laguna Woods	Orange	5,598	48.21%	5,895	50.77%	119	1.02%	-297	-2.56%	11,612	-7.86%
Lake Forest	Orange	13,307	40.86%	18,484	56.76%	777	2.39%	-5,177	-15.90%	32,568	-6.69%
Los Alamitos	Orange	2,212	45.24%	2,543	52.00%	135	2.76%	-331	-6.77%	4,890	-4.40%
Mission Viejo	Orange	18,361	39.29%	27,409	58.66%	958	2.05%	-9,048	-19.36%	46,728	-8.36%
Newport Beach	Orange	15,152	32.31%	30,842	65.76%	908	1.94%	-15,690	-33.45%	46,902	-16.20%
Orange	Orange	22,065	42.88%	28,113	54.64%	1,275	2.48%	-6,048	-11.75%	51,453	-2.82%
Placentia	Orange	8,581	42.18%	11,348	55.78%	416	2.04%	-2,767	-13.60%	20,345	-2.47%
Rancho Santa Margarita	Orange	7,914	37.06%	13,004	60.90%	435	2.04%	-5,090	-23.84%	21,353	-11.33%
San Clemente	Orange	11,161	35.68%	19,518	62.39%	605	1.93%	-8,357	-26.71%	31,284	-12.71%
San Juan Capistrano	Orange	5,548	37.34%	9,032	60.78%	279	1.88%	-3,484	-23.45%	14,859	-8.59%
Santa Ana	Orange	42,748	69.37%	17,584	28.53%	1,291	2.09%	25,164	40.84%	61,623	7.71%
Seal Beach	Orange	6,351	43.46%	7,990	54.68%	271	1.85%	-1,639	-11.22%	14,612	-6.97%
Stanton	Orange	5,057	59.95%	3,199	37.93%	179	2.12%	1,858	22.03%	8,435	12.21%
Tustin	Orange	11,844	49.69%	11,366	47.69%	624	2.62%	478	2.01%	23,834	-3.35%
Villa Park	Orange	928	24.87%	2,742	73.47%	62	1.66%	-1,814	-48.61%	3,732	-4.76%
Westminster	Orange	14,607	50.11%	13,902	47.69%	642	2.20%	705	2.42%	29,151	16.40%
Yorba Linda	Orange	10,350	29.72%	23,762	68.24%	710	2.04%	-13,412	-38.52%	34,822	-7.86%
Unincorporated area	Orange	19,739	35.59%	34,577	62.34%	1,152	2.08%	-14,838	-26.75%	55,468	-8.65%
Auburn	Placer	3,232	45.51%	3,642	51.28%	228	3.21%	-410	-5.77%	7,102	-8.26%
Colfax	Placer	290	41.73%	378	54.39%	27	3.88%	-88	-12.66%	695	-13.67%
Lincoln	Placer	8,004	38.06%	12,618	60.01%	406	1.93%	-4,614	-21.94%	21,028	-9.51%
Loomis	Placer	1,090	31.35%	2,281	65.60%	106	3.05%	-1,191	-34.25%	3,477	-9.67%
Rocklin	Placer	10,179	38.46%	15,632	59.06%	658	2.49%	-5,453	-20.60%	26,469	-7.90%
Roseville	Placer	22,522	40.95%	31,256	56.83%	1,222	2.22%	-8,734	-15.88%	55,000	-6.73%
Unincorporated area	Placer	21,501	37.69%	34,114	59.81%	1,425	2.50%	-12,613	-22.11%	57,040	-8.76%
Portola	Plumas	311	43.44%	383	53.49%	22	3.07%	-72	-10.06%	716	-4.67%
Unincorporated area	Plumas	3,715	39.98%	5,338	57.45%	239	2.57%	-1,623	-17.47%	9,292	-4.93%
Banning	Riverside	4,575	46.90%	5,016	51.43%	163	1.67%	-441	-4.52%	9,754	0.42%
Beaumont	Riverside	5,519	45.39%	6,395	52.60%	244	2.01%	-876	-7.21%	12,158	-3.52%
Blythe	Riverside	1,660	50.73%	1,544	47.19%	68	2.08%	116	3.55%	3,272	6.05%
Calimesa	Riverside	1,104	33.92%	2,080	63.90%	71	2.18%	-976	-29.98%	3,255	-5.53%
Canyon Lake	Riverside	1,236	25.32%	3,558	72.88%	88	1.80%	-2,322	-47.56%	4,882	-9.17%
Cathedral City	Riverside	8,723	64.81%	4,561	33.89%	175	1.30%	4,162	30.92%	13,459	4.82%
Coachella	Riverside	5,072	88.07%	618	10.73%	69	1.20%	4,454	77.34%	5,759	8.02%
Corona	Riverside	22,095	47.12%	23,732	50.61%	1,064	2.27%	-1,637	-3.49%	46,891	-2.81%
Desert Hot Springs	Riverside	3,522	63.51%	1,871	33.74%	153	2.76%	1,651	29.77%	5,546	7.79%
Eastvale	Riverside	8,522	55.87%	6,446	42.26%	285	1.87%	2,076	13.61%	15,253	N/A (Note: City not incorporated during 2008 election)
Hemet	Riverside	10,739	44.03%	13,152	53.92%	501	2.05%	-2,413	-9.89%	24,392	-0.42%
Indian Wells	Riverside	674	25.80%	1,913	73.24%	25	0.96%	-1,239	-47.43%	2,612	-11.99%
Indio	Riverside	11,902	58.26%	8,245	40.36%	282	1.38%	3,657	17.90%	20,429	0.26%
Jurupa Valley	Riverside	12,142	56.62%	8,757	40.84%	545	2.54%	3,385	15.79%	21,444	N/A
La Quinta	Riverside	6,248	40.74%	8,876	57.88%	211	1.38%	-2,628	-17.14%	15,335	-4.36%
Lake Elsinore	Riverside	6,328	48.51%	6,417	49.19%	300	2.30%	-89	-0.68%	13,045	-4.05%
Menifee	Riverside	11,758	40.21%	16,969	58.04%	512	1.75%	-5,211	-17.82%	29,239	N/A
Moreno Valley	Riverside	35,406	68.83%	15,146	29.44%	889	1.73%	20,260	39.38%	51,441	6.68%
Murrieta	Riverside	13,520	36.52%	22,799	61.58%	706	1.91%	-9,279	-25.06%	37,025	-6.58%
Norco	Riverside	2,837	31.32%	6,050	66.79%	171	1.89%	-3,213	-35.47%	9,058	-5.74%
Palm Desert	Riverside	8,694	43.53%	10,992	55.04%	286	1.43%	-2,298	-11.51%	19,972	-3.57%
Palm Springs	Riverside	13,094	68.81%	5,632	29.60%	304	1.60%	7,462	39.21%	19,030	2.53%
Perris	Riverside	10,539	77.91%	2,782	20.56%	207	1.53%	7,757	57.34%	13,528	11.71%
Rancho Mirage	Riverside	3,709	43.49%	4,730	55.46%	90	1.06%	-1,021	-11.97%	8,529	-5.07%
Riverside	Riverside	50,794	56.64%	36,625	40.84%	2,260	2.52%	14,169	15.80%	89,679	1.49%
San Jacinto	Riverside	5,393	51.58%	4,783	45.74%	280	2.68%	610	5.83%	10,456	3.50%
Temecula	Riverside	13,603	36.83%	22,549	61.05%	783	2.12%	-8,946	-24.22%	36,935	-6.99%
Wildomar	Riverside	4,078	37.28%	6,580	60.16%	280	2.56%	-2,502	-22.87%	10,938	-3.72%
Unincorporated area	Riverside	45,577	42.48%	59,309	55.27%	2,413	2.25%	-13,732	-12.80%	107,299	-7.41%
Citrus Heights	Sacramento	13,744	43.74%	16,753	53.31%	926	2.95%	-3,009	-9.58%	31,423	-3.82%
Elk Grove	Sacramento	34,433	57.72%	24,045	40.31%	1,179	1.98%	10,388	17.41%	59,657	0.27%
Folsom	Sacramento	12,818	42.20%	16,831	55.41%	727	2.39%	-4,013	-13.21%	30,376	-5.24%
Galt	Sacramento	3,397	45.66%	3,877	52.12%	165	2.22%	-480	-6.45%	7,439	-2.06%
Isleton	Sacramento	162	65.59%	74	29.96%	11	4.45%	88	35.63%	247	12.80%
Rancho Cordova	Sacramento	12,602	56.55%	9,069	40.70%	612	2.75%	3,533	15.86%	22,283	1.16%
Sacramento	Sacramento	115,979	72.95%	39,029	24.55%	3,966	2.49%	76,950	48.40%	158,974	1.98%
Unincorporated area	Sacramento	107,368	52.26%	92,836	45.19%	5,252	2.56%	14,532	7.07%	205,456	-0.49%
Hollister	San Benito	6,986	67.10%	3,220	30.93%	205	1.97%	3,766	36.17%	10,411	-1.13%
San Juan Bautista	San Benito	485	67.74%	217	30.31%	14	1.96%	268	37.43%	716	0.66%
Unincorporated area	San Benito	3,805	48.24%	3,906	49.52%	176	2.23%	-101	-1.28%	7,887	-3.53%
Adelanto	San Bernardino	3,405	68.13%	1,472	29.45%	121	2.42%	1,933	38.68%	4,998	7.75%
Apple Valley	San Bernardino	8,776	34.73%	15,878	62.84%	614	2.43%	-7,102	-28.11%	25,268	-3.01%
Barstow	San Bernardino	2,717	51.56%	2,376	45.09%	177	3.36%	341	6.47%	5,270	5.53%
Big Bear Lake	San Bernardino	789	34.13%	1,469	63.54%	54	2.34%	-680	-29.41%	2,312	-3.64%
Chino	San Bernardino	11,932	51.97%	10,585	46.11%	441	1.92%	1,347	5.87%	22,958	0.34%
Chino Hills	San Bernardino	13,477	46.28%	15,127	51.95%	515	1.77%	-1,650	-5.67%	29,119	-3.15%
Colton	San Bernardino	8,520	70.42%	3,296	27.24%	283	2.34%	5,224	43.18%	12,099	4.48%
Fontana	San Bernardino	32,180	69.74%	13,084	28.36%	878	1.90%	19,096	41.39%	46,142	5.36%
Grand Terrace	San Bernardino	2,264	48.54%	2,271	48.69%	129	2.77%	-7	-0.15%	4,664	0.67%
Hesperia	San Bernardino	9,866	41.87%	13,067	55.46%	628	2.67%	-3,201	-13.59%	23,561	1.99%
Highland	San Bernardino	8,194	52.89%	6,997	45.16%	302	1.95%	1,197	7.73%	15,493	0.44%
Loma Linda	San Bernardino	3,499	49.86%	3,310	47.16%	209	2.98%	189	2.69%	7,018	1.41%
Montclair	San Bernardino	5,826	69.23%	2,434	28.92%	156	1.85%	3,392	40.30%	8,416	9.59%
Needles	San Bernardino	604	48.87%	583	47.17%	49	3.96%	21	1.70%	1,236	4.62%
Ontario	San Bernardino	24,977	63.69%	13,449	34.30%	789	2.01%	11,528	29.40%	39,215	3.15%
Rancho Cucamonga	San Bernardino	30,667	48.35%	31,496	49.65%	1,267	2.00%	-829	-1.31%	63,430	-2.10%
Redlands	San Bernardino	13,305	46.95%	14,348	50.63%	685	2.42%	-1,043	-3.68%	28,338	-2.20%
Rialto	San Bernardino	17,688	75.33%	5,396	22.98%	397	1.69%	12,292	52.35%	23,481	4.87%
San Bernardino	San Bernardino	30,437	67.76%	13,562	30.19%	923	2.05%	16,875	37.57%	44,922	6.20%
Twentynine Palms	San Bernardino	1,585	40.39%	2,231	56.86%	108	2.75%	-646	-16.46%	3,924	1.17%
Upland	San Bernardino	13,581	47.78%	14,253	50.14%	590	2.08%	-672	-2.36%	28,424	-1.88%
Victorville	San Bernardino	15,584	56.86%	11,193	40.84%	631	2.30%	4,391	16.02%	27,408	6.26%
Yucaipa	San Bernardino	6,840	34.68%	12,388	62.80%	498	2.52%	-5,548	-28.13%	19,726	-4.36%
Yucca Valley	San Bernardino	2,598	35.73%	4,451	61.22%	222	3.05%	-1,853	-25.48%	7,271	-3.16%
Unincorporated area	San Bernardino	35,798	41.67%	47,642	55.46%	2,470	2.88%	-11,844	-13.79%	85,910	-1.87%
Carlsbad	San Diego	24,224	44.76%	28,852	53.31%	1,043	1.93%	-4,628	-8.55%	54,119	-8.97%
Chula Vista	San Diego	48,219	60.49%	30,221	37.91%	1,271	1.59%	17,998	22.58%	79,711	2.25%
Coronado	San Diego	3,455	39.04%	5,230	59.10%	164	1.85%	-1,775	-20.06%	8,849	-4.85%
Del Mar	San Diego	1,483	53.21%	1,255	45.03%	49	1.76%	228	8.18%	2,787	-20.46%
El Cajon	San Diego	13,383	46.05%	15,125	52.05%	552	1.90%	-1,742	-5.99%	29,060	-0.79%
Encinitas	San Diego	18,610	56.39%	13,597	41.20%	795	2.41%	5,013	15.19%	33,002	-8.97%
Escondido	San Diego	19,461	44.67%	23,164	53.17%	940	2.16%	-3,703	-8.50%	43,565	-0.53%
Imperial Beach	San Diego	4,303	58.16%	2,904	39.25%	192	2.59%	1,399	18.91%	7,399	1.57%
La Mesa	San Diego	14,020	55.25%	10,732	42.29%	623	2.46%	3,288	12.96%	25,375	-0.26%
Lemon Grove	San Diego	5,625	61.38%	3,338	36.43%	201	2.19%	2,287	24.96%	9,164	6.27%
National City	San Diego	8,491	69.91%	3,458	28.47%	197	1.62%	5,033	41.44%	12,146	9.91%
Oceanside	San Diego	31,320	49.50%	30,538	48.27%	1,409	2.23%	782	1.24%	63,267	-1.25%
Poway	San Diego	9,170	38.44%	14,217	59.60%	469	1.97%	-5,047	-21.16%	23,856	-3.40%
San Diego	San Diego	312,832	61.29%	185,922	36.43%	11,660	2.28%	126,910	24.86%	510,414	-1.98%
San Marcos	San Diego	13,885	46.26%	15,484	51.59%	647	2.16%	-1,599	-5.33%	30,016	-4.08%
Santee	San Diego	9,241	37.77%	14,663	59.92%	565	2.31%	-5,422	-22.16%	24,469	-2.58%
Solana Beach	San Diego	3,728	51.03%	3,441	47.10%	136	1.86%	287	3.93%	7,305	-10.76%
Vista	San Diego	13,068	47.31%	13,870	50.21%	685	2.48%	-802	-2.90%	27,623	-2.70%
Unincorporated area	San Diego	72,439	36.80%	120,715	61.33%	3,690	1.87%	-48,276	-24.53%	196,844	-4.08%
San Francisco	San Francisco	301,723	83.64%	47,076	13.05%	11,926	3.31%	254,647	70.59%	360,725	0.01%
Escalon	San Joaquin	1,010	36.66%	1,693	61.45%	52	1.89%	-683	-24.79%	2,755	-3.18%
Lathrop	San Joaquin	3,370	69.53%	1,373	28.33%	104	2.15%	1,997	41.20%	4,847	9.99%
Lodi	San Joaquin	8,365	40.10%	12,035	57.69%	461	2.21%	-3,670	-17.59%	20,861	-1.15%
Manteca	San Joaquin	11,288	51.95%	9,930	45.70%	510	2.35%	1,358	6.25%	21,728	0.50%
Ripon	San Joaquin	1,881	29.80%	4,303	68.16%	129	2.04%	-2,422	-38.37%	6,313	-4.17%
Stockton	San Joaquin	53,139	67.82%	23,834	30.42%	1,377	1.76%	29,305	37.40%	78,350	5.88%
Tracy	San Joaquin	15,253	62.37%	8,737	35.73%	466	1.91%	6,516	26.64%	24,456	3.23%
Unincorporated area	San Joaquin	19,815	44.07%	24,166	53.74%	986	2.19%	-4,351	-9.68%	44,967	0.44%
Arroyo Grande	San Luis Obispo	4,279	46.13%	4,746	51.16%	251	2.71%	-467	-5.03%	9,276	-2.81%
Atascadero	San Luis Obispo	5,927	44.58%	6,951	52.29%	416	3.13%	-1,024	-7.70%	13,294	-2.38%
El Paso de Robles	San Luis Obispo	4,987	41.52%	6,757	56.25%	268	2.23%	-1,770	-14.74%	12,012	-4.92%
Grover Beach	San Luis Obispo	2,595	51.70%	2,237	44.57%	187	3.73%	358	7.13%	5,019	-1.54%
Morro Bay	San Luis Obispo	3,354	58.19%	2,225	38.60%	185	3.21%	1,129	19.59%	5,764	-1.10%
Pismo Beach	San Luis Obispo	2,159	47.42%	2,288	50.25%	106	2.33%	-129	-2.83%	4,553	-5.85%
San Luis Obispo	San Luis Obispo	13,090	63.81%	6,596	32.15%	829	4.04%	6,494	31.65%	20,515	-5.10%
Unincorporated area	San Luis Obispo	24,867	45.60%	28,167	51.65%	1,499	2.75%	-3,300	-6.05%	54,533	-4.11%
Atherton	San Mateo	1,904	46.64%	2,104	51.54%	74	1.81%	-200	-4.90%	4,082	-21.34%
Belmont	San Mateo	8,896	71.26%	3,267	26.17%	321	2.57%	5,629	45.09%	12,484	-3.56%
Brisbane	San Mateo	1,547	78.13%	363	18.33%	70	3.54%	1,184	59.80%	1,980	-1.35%
Burlingame	San Mateo	9,118	69.06%	3,828	28.99%	257	1.95%	5,290	40.07%	13,203	-6.13%
Colma	San Mateo	362	83.03%	63	14.45%	11	2.52%	299	68.58%	436	8.74%
Daly City	San Mateo	21,781	78.86%	5,401	19.56%	437	1.58%	16,380	59.31%	27,619	8.16%
East Palo Alto	San Mateo	5,278	91.28%	399	6.90%	105	1.82%	4,879	84.38%	5,782	-0.08%
Foster City	San Mateo	8,677	70.02%	3,496	28.21%	219	1.77%	5,181	41.81%	12,392	-2.35%
Half Moon Bay	San Mateo	3,712	68.56%	1,557	28.76%	145	2.68%	2,155	39.80%	5,414	-2.80%
Hillsborough	San Mateo	2,667	45.47%	3,118	53.16%	80	1.36%	-451	-7.69%	5,865	-21.45%
Menlo Park	San Mateo	10,953	72.58%	3,791	25.12%	346	2.29%	7,162	47.46%	15,090	-7.43%
Millbrae	San Mateo	5,910	67.16%	2,706	30.75%	184	2.09%	3,204	36.41%	8,800	0.27%
Pacifica	San Mateo	13,899	75.69%	3,953	21.53%	512	2.79%	9,946	54.16%	18,364	0.43%
Portola Valley	San Mateo	1,854	64.20%	986	34.14%	48	1.66%	868	30.06%	2,888	-10.07%
Redwood City	San Mateo	21,141	72.60%	7,235	24.85%	744	2.55%	13,906	47.75%	29,120	-3.21%
San Bruno	San Mateo	11,550	75.11%	3,458	22.49%	370	2.41%	8,092	52.62%	15,378	2.02%
San Carlos	San Mateo	10,925	68.83%	4,579	28.85%	368	2.32%	6,346	39.98%	15,872	-4.58%
San Mateo	San Mateo	28,093	72.30%	9,931	25.56%	832	2.14%	18,162	46.74%	38,856	-2.11%
South San Francisco	San Mateo	16,146	77.74%	4,286	20.64%	338	1.63%	11,860	57.10%	20,770	4.65%
Woodside	San Mateo	1,767	54.14%	1,421	43.54%	76	2.33%	346	10.60%	3,264	-17.76%
Unincorporated area	San Mateo	19,905	72.43%	6,814	24.80%	762	2.77%	13,091	47.64%	27,481	-4.41%
Buellton	Santa Barbara	1,015	45.87%	1,132	51.15%	66	2.98%	-117	-5.29%	2,213	-8.70%
Carpinteria	Santa Barbara	3,536	64.44%	1,805	32.90%	146	2.66%	1,731	31.55%	5,487	-2.05%
Goleta	Santa Barbara	8,437	62.04%	4,718	34.69%	445	3.27%	3,719	27.35%	13,600	-5.06%
Guadalupe	Santa Barbara	1,020	73.43%	334	24.05%	35	2.52%	686	49.39%	1,389	4.91%
Lompoc	Santa Barbara	5,679	51.08%	5,136	46.20%	303	2.73%	543	4.88%	11,118	0.40%
Santa Barbara	Santa Barbara	27,761	71.48%	9,985	25.71%	1,092	2.81%	17,776	45.77%	38,838	-6.61%
Santa Maria	Santa Barbara	10,695	51.74%	9,566	46.28%	411	1.99%	1,129	5.46%	20,672	3.37%
Solvang	Santa Barbara	1,121	42.49%	1,463	55.46%	54	2.05%	-342	-12.96%	2,638	-8.61%
Unincorporated area	Santa Barbara	34,865	51.95%	30,467	45.40%	1,780	2.65%	4,398	6.55%	67,112	-7.21%
Campbell	Santa Clara	11,616	68.49%	4,820	28.42%	523	3.08%	6,796	40.07%	16,959	-0.24%
Cupertino	Santa Clara	15,362	69.67%	6,165	27.96%	522	2.37%	9,197	41.71%	22,049	-1.42%
Gilroy	Santa Clara	10,651	66.21%	5,089	31.63%	347	2.16%	5,562	34.57%	16,087	-1.48%
Los Altos	Santa Clara	10,752	64.63%	5,510	33.12%	373	2.24%	5,242	31.51%	16,635	-6.55%
Los Altos Hills	Santa Clara	2,724	56.01%	2,040	41.95%	99	2.04%	684	14.07%	4,863	-12.87%
Los Gatos	Santa Clara	9,917	61.58%	5,820	36.14%	368	2.29%	4,097	25.44%	16,105	-8.76%
Milpitas	Santa Clara	14,197	71.75%	5,188	26.22%	402	2.03%	9,009	45.53%	19,787	12.22%
Monte Sereno	Santa Clara	1,134	53.47%	935	44.08%	52	2.45%	199	9.38%	2,121	-10.98%
Morgan Hill	Santa Clara	9,422	59.14%	6,134	38.50%	377	2.37%	3,288	20.64%	15,933	-2.77%
Mountain View	Santa Clara	21,624	76.22%	5,703	20.10%	1,044	3.68%	15,921	56.12%	28,371	-0.24%
Palo Alto	Santa Clara	24,849	77.18%	6,446	20.02%	903	2.80%	18,403	57.16%	32,198	-5.03%
San Jose	Santa Clara	228,226	71.64%	82,940	26.04%	7,404	2.32%	145,286	45.61%	318,570	5.45%
Santa Clara	Santa Clara	27,017	71.54%	9,595	25.41%	1,152	3.05%	17,422	46.13%	37,764	2.23%
Saratoga	Santa Clara	9,614	59.04%	6,346	38.97%	325	2.00%	3,268	20.07%	16,285	-5.10%
Sunnyvale	Santa Clara	33,155	72.01%	11,405	24.77%	1,485	3.23%	21,750	47.24%	46,045	2.11%
Unincorporated area	Santa Clara	20,558	63.89%	10,707	33.27%	914	2.84%	9,851	30.61%	32,179	-4.87%
Capitola	Santa Cruz	3,751	76.24%	999	20.30%	170	3.46%	2,752	55.93%	4,920	-1.82%
Santa Cruz	Santa Cruz	25,802	83.85%	3,451	11.22%	1,517	4.93%	22,351	72.64%	30,770	-3.20%
Scotts Valley	Santa Cruz	3,744	61.48%	2,146	35.24%	200	3.28%	1,598	26.24%	6,090	-3.24%
Watsonville	Santa Cruz	9,086	81.94%	1,783	16.08%	219	1.98%	7,303	65.86%	11,088	3.31%
Unincorporated area	Santa Cruz	48,422	72.53%	15,668	23.47%	2,675	4.01%	32,754	49.06%	66,765	-2.25%
Anderson	Shasta	1,177	37.44%	1,863	59.26%	104	3.31%	-686	-21.82%	3,144	-5.79%
Redding	Shasta	13,177	35.42%	23,010	61.85%	1,017	2.73%	-9,833	-26.43%	37,204	-3.28%
Shasta Lake	Shasta	1,467	39.10%	2,158	57.52%	127	3.38%	-691	-18.42%	3,752	-1.27%
Unincorporated area	Shasta	9,998	31.30%	21,036	65.87%	904	2.83%	-11,038	-34.56%	31,938	-3.70%
Loyalton	Sierra	131	37.22%	212	60.23%	9	2.56%	-81	-23.01%	352	0.76%
Unincorporated area	Sierra	522	36.55%	844	59.10%	62	4.34%	-322	-22.55%	1,428	-2.13%
Dorris	Siskiyou	83	32.81%	153	60.47%	17	6.72%	-70	-27.67%	253	10.15%
Dunsmuir	Siskiyou	445	59.49%	270	36.10%	33	4.41%	175	23.40%	748	-0.95%
Etna	Siskiyou	112	34.78%	204	63.35%	6	1.86%	-92	-28.57%	322	0.57%
Fort Jones	Siskiyou	105	36.46%	178	61.81%	5	1.74%	-73	-25.35%	288	5.42%
Montague	Siskiyou	148	28.52%	353	68.02%	18	3.47%	-205	-39.50%	519	-0.57%
Mt. Shasta	Siskiyou	938	60.24%	550	35.32%	69	4.43%	388	24.92%	1,557	-6.24%
Tulelake	Siskiyou	49	26.49%	131	70.81%	5	2.70%	-82	-44.32%	185	-12.34%
Weed	Siskiyou	491	55.17%	358	40.22%	41	4.61%	133	14.94%	890	-9.88%
Yreka	Siskiyou	1,126	37.82%	1,765	59.29%	86	2.89%	-639	-21.46%	2,977	-4.48%
Unincorporated area	Siskiyou	4,549	37.82%	7,115	59.15%	364	3.03%	-2,566	-21.33%	12,028	-5.10%
Benicia	Solano	9,234	64.28%	4,790	33.34%	341	2.37%	4,444	30.94%	14,365	-2.36%
Dixon	Solano	3,344	49.56%	3,251	48.18%	153	2.27%	93	1.38%	6,748	-6.59%
Fairfield	Solano	23,053	64.97%	11,734	33.07%	696	1.96%	11,319	31.90%	35,483	2.70%
Rio Vista	Solano	2,241	54.35%	1,807	43.83%	75	1.82%	434	10.53%	4,123	1.76%
Suisun City	Solano	6,611	70.97%	2,520	27.05%	184	1.98%	4,091	43.92%	9,315	2.45%
Vacaville	Solano	17,419	52.36%	15,016	45.14%	831	2.50%	2,403	7.22%	33,266	-2.23%
Vallejo	Solano	31,994	77.30%	8,585	20.74%	813	1.96%	23,409	56.55%	41,392	4.95%
Unincorporated area	Solano	2,887	38.74%	4,389	58.90%	176	2.36%	-1,502	-20.16%	7,452	-12.47%
Cloverdale	Sonoma	2,366	67.31%	1,059	30.13%	90	2.56%	1,307	37.18%	3,515	-2.47%
Cotati	Sonoma	2,470	73.73%	760	22.69%	120	3.58%	1,710	51.04%	3,350	-5.11%
Healdsburg	Sonoma	3,874	72.41%	1,318	24.64%	158	2.95%	2,556	47.78%	5,350	-2.78%
Petaluma	Sonoma	20,008	72.37%	6,758	24.44%	880	3.18%	13,250	47.93%	27,646	-2.76%
Rohnert Park	Sonoma	11,509	70.74%	4,220	25.94%	540	3.32%	7,289	44.80%	16,269	-2.90%
Santa Rosa	Sonoma	48,993	72.08%	16,828	24.76%	2,150	3.16%	32,165	47.32%	67,971	-4.04%
Sebastopol	Sonoma	3,711	83.71%	547	12.34%	175	3.95%	3,164	71.37%	4,433	-1.34%
Sonoma	Sonoma	4,098	70.35%	1,579	27.11%	148	2.54%	2,519	43.24%	5,825	-6.50%
Windsor	Sonoma	7,449	64.59%	3,761	32.61%	323	2.80%	3,688	31.98%	11,533	-4.77%
Unincorporated area	Sonoma	49,464	70.44%	17,954	25.57%	2,801	3.99%	31,510	44.87%	70,219	-4.07%
Ceres	Stanislaus	6,934	60.95%	4,154	36.51%	289	2.54%	2,780	24.44%	11,377	7.70%
Hughson	Stanislaus	935	40.18%	1,329	57.11%	63	2.71%	-394	-16.93%	2,327	-0.59%
Modesto	Stanislaus	34,825	53.05%	29,208	44.50%	1,607	2.45%	5,617	8.56%	65,640	1.21%
Newman	Stanislaus	1,455	58.88%	959	38.81%	57	2.31%	496	20.07%	2,471	3.55%
Oakdale	Stanislaus	2,747	38.40%	4,208	58.83%	198	2.77%	-1,461	-20.42%	7,153	-3.33%
Patterson	Stanislaus	3,363	66.03%	1,626	31.93%	104	2.04%	1,737	34.11%	5,093	1.86%
Riverbank	Stanislaus	3,425	53.36%	2,843	44.29%	151	2.35%	582	9.07%	6,419	0.62%
Turlock	Stanislaus	10,132	48.09%	10,438	49.54%	501	2.38%	-306	-1.45%	21,071	-0.84%
Waterford	Stanislaus	940	42.23%	1,218	54.72%	68	3.05%	-278	-12.49%	2,226	1.46%
Unincorporated area	Stanislaus	12,968	41.59%	17,476	56.05%	737	2.36%	-4,508	-14.46%	31,181	-0.64%
Live Oak	Sutter	1,083	54.70%	853	43.08%	44	2.22%	230	11.62%	1,980	4.92%
Yuba City	Sutter	8,613	43.23%	10,857	54.50%	452	2.27%	-2,244	-11.26%	19,922	-1.29%
Unincorporated area	Sutter	2,496	27.49%	6,412	70.62%	172	1.89%	-3,916	-43.13%	9,080	-6.60%
Corning	Tehama	788	43.95%	938	52.31%	67	3.74%	-150	-8.37%	1,793	-0.01%
Red Bluff	Tehama	1,748	42.74%	2,184	53.40%	158	3.86%	-436	-10.66%	4,090	-3.02%
Tehama	Tehama	60	35.09%	106	61.99%	5	2.92%	-46	-26.90%	171	-0.75%
Unincorporated area	Tehama	5,338	31.66%	11,007	65.28%	515	3.05%	-5,669	-33.62%	16,860	-3.78%
Unincorporated area	Trinity	2,674	47.13%	2,716	47.87%	284	5.01%	-42	-0.74%	5,674	-5.35%
Dinuba	Tulare	2,125	57.53%	1,507	40.80%	62	1.68%	618	16.73%	3,694	7.95%
Exeter	Tulare	949	32.31%	1,936	65.92%	52	1.77%	-987	-33.61%	2,937	-3.23%
Farmersville	Tulare	855	65.32%	436	33.31%	18	1.38%	419	32.01%	1,309	6.10%
Lindsay	Tulare	1,010	66.53%	469	30.90%	39	2.57%	541	35.64%	1,518	10.89%
Porterville	Tulare	5,013	46.75%	5,467	50.99%	242	2.26%	-454	-4.23%	10,722	4.81%
Tulare	Tulare	5,705	42.52%	7,416	55.27%	297	2.21%	-1,711	-12.75%	13,418	-0.67%
Visalia	Tulare	14,586	38.95%	22,086	58.98%	776	2.07%	-7,500	-20.03%	37,448	-1.23%
Woodlake	Tulare	731	71.18%	275	26.78%	21	2.04%	456	44.40%	1,027	6.22%
Unincorporated area	Tulare	10,778	37.54%	17,364	60.49%	565	1.97%	-6,586	-22.94%	28,707	-0.92%
Sonora	Tuolumne	1,226	48.50%	1,203	47.59%	99	3.92%	23	0.91%	2,528	0.13%
Unincorporated area	Tuolumne	8,772	39.73%	12,677	57.41%	631	2.86%	-3,905	-17.69%	22,080	-3.30%
Camarillo	Ventura	14,762	45.78%	16,795	52.08%	689	2.14%	-2,033	-6.30%	32,246	-5.08%
Fillmore	Ventura	2,659	59.22%	1,749	38.95%	82	1.83%	910	20.27%	4,490	-1.14%
Moorpark	Ventura	7,277	46.78%	7,983	51.31%	297	1.91%	-706	-4.54%	15,557	-7.64%
Ojai	Ventura	2,530	62.92%	1,354	33.67%	137	3.41%	1,176	29.25%	4,021	-5.41%
Oxnard	Ventura	33,690	70.17%	13,372	27.85%	952	1.98%	20,318	42.32%	48,014	1.56%
Port Hueneme	Ventura	3,952	65.40%	1,921	31.79%	170	2.81%	2,031	33.61%	6,043	5.00%
San Buenaventura	Ventura	27,713	56.68%	19,823	40.54%	1,361	2.78%	7,890	16.14%	48,897	-5.72%
Santa Paula	Ventura	5,202	64.29%	2,711	33.51%	178	2.20%	2,491	30.79%	8,091	-0.17%
Simi Valley	Ventura	23,122	42.78%	29,673	54.90%	1,250	2.31%	-6,551	-12.12%	54,045	-7.21%
Thousand Oaks	Ventura	28,995	46.14%	32,491	51.70%	1,355	2.16%	-3,496	-5.56%	62,841	-8.29%
Unincorporated area	Ventura	21,027	49.86%	20,086	47.63%	1,061	2.52%	941	2.23%	42,174	-7.96%
Davis	Yolo	23,058	78.16%	5,369	18.20%	1,073	3.64%	17,689	59.96%	29,500	-2.73%
West Sacramento	Yolo	9,465	61.17%	5,583	36.08%	426	2.75%	3,882	25.09%	15,474	-0.07%
Winters	Yolo	1,398	59.36%	906	38.47%	51	2.17%	492	20.89%	2,355	-1.62%
Woodland	Yolo	10,357	56.71%	7,489	41.01%	417	2.28%	2,868	15.70%	18,263	0.39%
Unincorporated area	Yolo	4,437	51.14%	4,021	46.35%	218	2.51%	416	4.79%	8,676	-5.84%
Marysville	Yuba	1,362	43.02%	1,689	53.35%	115	3.63%	-327	-10.33%	3,166	-1.69%
Wheatland	Yuba	399	33.96%	727	61.87%	49	4.17%	-328	-27.91%	1,175	-6.19%
Unincorporated area	Yuba	5,950	38.88%	8,859	57.88%	496	3.24%	-2,909	-19.01%	15,305	-3.52%
Totals		7,854,285	60.35% (Note: Statewide candidate vote percentages and the total vote number differ here because California's Supplement to Statement of Vote does not count write-in votes as part of the city totals.)	4,839,956	37.19%	321,055	2.47%	3,014,329	23.16%	13,015,296	-0.93%

==== Cities and unincorporated areas that flipped from Democratic to Republican ====
- Aliso Viejo (Orange)
- Atherton (San Mateo)
- Auburn (Placer)
- Bishop (Inyo)
- Buellton (Santa Barbara)
- Carlsbad (San Diego)
- Colfax (Placer)
- Costa Mesa (Orange)
- Dos Palos (Merced)
- Hidden Hills (Los Angeles)
- Hillsborough (San Mateo)
- La Canada Flintridge (Los Angeles)
- Laguna Woods (Orange)
- Lake Elsinore (Riverside)
- Moorpark (Ventura)
- Pismo Beach (San Luis Obispo)
- Placerville (El Dorado)
- Rancho Cucamonga (San Bernardino)
- Sutter Creek (Amador)
- Thousand Oaks (Ventura)
- Unincorporated area of San Benito
- Unincorporated area of Trinity
- Westlake Village (Los Angeles)

==== Cities and unincorporated areas that flipped from Republican to Democratic ====
- Blythe (Riverside)
- Garden Grove (Orange)
- La Mirada (Los Angeles)
- La Palma (Orange)
- Needles (San Bernardino)
- Unincorporated area of Imperial
- Vernon (Los Angeles)
- Westminster (Orange)

== See also ==
- Timeline of the 2012 United States presidential election
- 2012 Republican Party presidential debates and forums
- 2012 Republican Party presidential primaries
- Results of the 2012 Republican Party presidential primaries
- California Republican Party
