= Edward Noonan =

Edward Noonan may refer to:

- Edward A. Noonan (1852–1927), mayor of St Louis, USA
- Edward C. Noonan (born 1948), American politician
- Edward Thomas Noonan (1861–1923), American politician from Illinois
- Edward Noonan (architect) (born 1930), Chicago architect and developer
