= Chris Noonan (disambiguation) =

Chris Noonan (born 1952) is an Australian filmmaker.

Chris Noonan may also refer to:

- Chris Noonan (ice hockey) (born 1988), US goaltender, see 2011 Atlantic Hockey men's ice hockey tournament
- Chris Noonan (academic), New Zealand law academic
