= Nunan =

Nunan (Irish: Ó Nuanáin, Ó Núnáin and Ó hIonmhaineáin) is an Irish surname. Notable people with the surname include:

- Mick Nunan (born 1949), former Australian rules football player
- David Nunan (born 1949), Australian linguist
- Joseph Nunan (1842–1885), Irish born patriot and builder
- Paul Nunan (1858–1934), Australian educationalist
- Sheila Nunan, General Secretary of the Irish National Teachers' Organisation
- Joseph D. Nunan, Jr. (1897–1968), American politician

== See also ==
- Noonan
