= Thomas Noonan =

Thomas Noonan, Tom Noonan or Tommy Noonan may refer to:

- Tommy Noonan (1921–1968), American television and film actor
- Thomas S. Noonan (1938–2001), American historian, anthropologist and Slavicist
- Thomas P. Noonan Jr. (1943–1969), American Marine lance corporal
- Tom Noonan (1951–2026), American actor, director, and screenwriter
- Thomas Noonan (musician) (born 1974), American drummer

== See also ==
- Edward Thomas Noonan (1861–1923), American lawyer and legislator
- John Thomas Noonan, Jr. (1926–2017), American jurist and moral theologian
- Noonan
