= Michael Noonan (linguist) =

American linguist (1947-2009)

Michael Paul "Mickey" Noonan
- Born: September 14, 1947; Auburn, New York, U.S.
- Died: February 23, 2009 (aged 61)
- Education: UCLA
- Known for: Tibeto-Burman languages Documentary linguistics Nilotic languages
- Scientific career
- Fields: Linguistics
- Workplaces: SUNY Buffalo; CSULA; University of Wisconsin–Milwaukee

Michael Noonan (September 12, 1947 – February 23, 2009), was an American linguist specializing in functional and typological linguistics. He graduated from UCLA with a PhD in Linguistics in 1981. He specialized in particular in Tibeto-Burman, Nilotic (Lango languages, the Chantyal language, and the Nar Phu language.
