= Michael Noonan =

Michael Noonan may refer to:

== Writers and academics ==
- Michael Noonan (Australian writer) (1921–2000), Australian novelist and radio script writer
- Michael A. Noonan (1940–2023), New Zealand screenwriter
- Michael Noonan (linguist) (1947–2009), American linguist
- Michael Noonan (filmmaker) (born 1972), Australian filmmaker and academic

== Politics ==
- Michael K. Noonan, Irish Cumann na nGaedhael Party TD for Cork East, 1924–1927
- Michael J. Noonan (Fianna Fáil politician) (1935–2013), Irish Fianna Fáil politician
- Michael Noonan (Fine Gael politician) (born 1943), Irish Fine Gael politician and former party leader

== Other ==
- Mike Noonan (born 1961), American soccer coach
- Michael Noonan (admiral) (born 1966), Australian admiral
- Michael Noonan (footballer) (born 2008), Irish footballer
- Michael Noonan, a character from the novel Bag of Bones, by Stephen King
