= 2006 California State Treasurer election =

- November 7, 2006
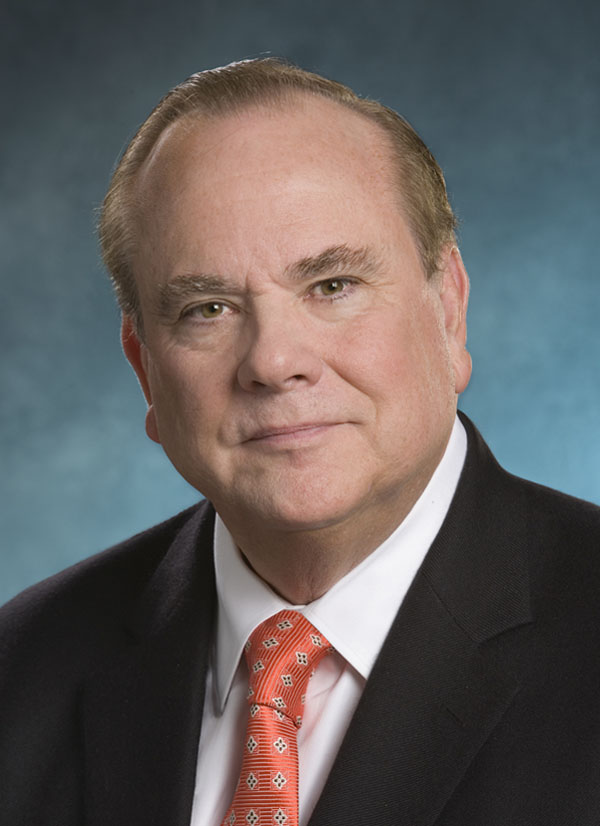

Nominee	Bill Lockyer	Claude Parrish
Party	Democratic	Republican
Popular vote	4,523,854	3,095,615
Percentage	54.37%	37.21%
- County results Lockyer: 40–50% 50–60% 60–70% 70–80% Parrish: 40–50% 50–60%
Treasurer before election
Phil Angelides
Democratic
Elected Treasurer
Bill Lockyer
Democratic

The 2006 California State Treasurer election occurred on November 7, 2006. The primary elections took place on June 6, 2006. Attorney General Bill Lockyer, the Democratic nominee, easily defeated the Republican nominee, Board of Equalization member Claude Parrish, for the office previously held by Democrat Phil Angelides, who was term-limited and ran for governor.

== Primary results ==
A bar graph of statewide results in this contest are available at https://web.archive.org/web/20070517094424/http://primary2006.ss.ca.gov/Returns/trs/00.htm.

Results by county are available here and here.

=== Republican ===
==== Candidates ====
Claude Parrish, Board of Equalization member

Keith Richman, Assemblyman

California State Treasurer Republican primary, 2006
Candidate	Votes	%
Claude Parrish	912,818	56.29
Keith Richman	709,734	43.71
Total votes	1,622,552	100.00

=== Others ===
California State Treasurer primary, 2006 (Others)
Party	Candidate	Votes	%
Democratic	Bill Lockyer	2,079,963	100.00
Green	Mehul Thakker	31,178	100.00
American Independent	E. Justin Noonan	30,684	100.00
Libertarian	Marian Smithson	16,745	100.00
Peace and Freedom	Jack Harrison	3,681	100.00

== Results ==
California State Treasurer election, 2006
Party	Candidate	Votes	%
Democratic	Bill Lockyer	4,523,854	54.37
Republican	Claude Parrish	3,095,615	37.21
Libertarian	Marian Smithson	334,056	4.01
Green	Mehul Thakker	201,670	2.42
American Independent	E. Justin Noonan	93,281	1.12
Peace and Freedom	Jack Harrison	71,726	0.86
Invalid or blank votes		578,857	6.50
Total votes		8,320,202	100.00
Turnout			39.29
Democratic hold			

=== Results by county ===
Results from the Secretary of State of California:

County	Lockyer	Votes	Parrish	Votes	Smithson	Votes	Thakker	Votes	Others	Votes
San Francisco	76.17%	176,013	12.76%	29,485	3.47%	8,026	5.78%	13,366	1.82%	4,201
Alameda	72.44%	285,210	18.90%	74,424	2.77%	10,899	4.46%	17,547	1.43%	5,649
Marin	68.82%	69,678	22.93%	23,218	3.36%	3,407	3.70%	3,750	1.18%	1,197
Santa Cruz	67.45%	58,193	21.85%	18,850	3.92%	3,383	5.24%	4,517	1.54%	1,335
San Mateo	66.46%	130,002	26.08%	51,018	2.95%	5,772	2.91%	5,702	1.60%	3,126
Sonoma	63.80%	106,638	25.74%	43,025	3.96%	6,623	4.20%	7,024	2.29%	3,828
Los Angeles	61.89%	1,158,447	29.91%	559,876	4.00%	74,839	2.09%	39,080	2.10%	39,466
Contra Costa	61.73%	179,451	31.91%	92,760	2.61%	7,593	2.08%	6,052	1.66%	4,830
Santa Clara	61.20%	251,172	29.46%	120,919	4.68%	19,188	2.79%	11,440	1.87%	7,673
Yolo	60.62%	31,755	31.15%	16,320	3.70%	1,937	3.56%	1,864	0.97%	508
Monterey	60.24%	51,554	31.87%	27,271	3.64%	3,113	2.42%	2,073	1.83%	1,563
Mendocino	59.76%	17,773	26.57%	7,903	4.93%	1,465	6.19%	1,840	2.56%	761
Solano	59.61%	60,413	32.87%	33,317	3.65%	3,703	1.84%	1,866	2.02%	2,050
Napa	57.93%	23,926	33.27%	13,743	3.53%	1,460	3.27%	1,352	2.00%	824
Imperial	56.44%	12,235	34.64%	7,508	3.92%	850	1.61%	348	3.39%	735
San Benito	55.23%	7,650	35.93%	4,977	4.29%	594	2.03%	281	2.52%	349
Humboldt	53.57%	24,928	32.72%	15,226	4.36%	2,029	7.01%	3,263	2.33%	1,084
Lake	53.17%	10,021	35.81%	6,750	4.36%	822	3.37%	635	3.29%	620
Sacramento	51.97%	178,296	39.41%	135,211	4.18%	14,343	2.40%	8,222	2.04%	6,982
San Joaquin	51.00%	68,594	40.73%	54,786	4.33%	5,825	1.69%	2,277	2.24%	3,017
Santa Barbara	50.86%	59,354	39.65%	46,274	5.17%	6,039	2.64%	3,086	1.67%	1,948
Alpine	50.58%	260	36.96%	190	7.39%	38	3.31%	17	1.75%	9
Merced	49.76%	20,265	42.44%	17,284	3.37%	1,372	1.45%	592	2.97%	1,209
Ventura	48.61%	103,110	43.63%	92,565	4.16%	8,821	1.83%	3,876	1.77%	3,765
Stanislaus	48.54%	49,112	44.95%	45,475	3.01%	3,043	1.48%	1,493	2.03%	2,051
San Diego	47.55%	353,622	44.36%	329,914	4.19%	31,155	1.89%	14,032	2.01%	14,943
San Bernardino	46.92%	156,425	44.59%	148,668	4.35%	14,510	1.80%	6,014	2.34%	7,802
Del Norte	46.40%	3,049	43.05%	2,829	4.70%	309	2.66%	175	3.18%	209
Fresno	46.25%	78,401	46.10%	78,147	3.96%	6,714	1.49%	2,528	2.21%	3,734
Trinity	45.23%	2,521	40.83%	2,276	7.41%	413	4.34%	242	2.19%	122
San Luis Obispo	44.99%	41,653	46.70%	43,238	4.02%	3,725	2.69%	2,494	1.59%	1,472
Riverside	44.35%	165,096	47.76%	177,775	4.14%	15,428	1.58%	5,889	2.17%	8,056
Mono	44.22%	1,615	44.39%	1,621	5.48%	200	3.64%	133	2.28%	83
Nevada	44.09%	18,298	46.33%	19,226	4.87%	2,022	3.70%	1,535	1.00%	417
Butte	43.18%	28,926	46.57%	31,197	4.86%	3,256	3.40%	2,281	2.00%	1,335
Kings	42.65%	9,517	50.14%	11,189	3.49%	778	1.25%	278	2.47%	552
Tuolumne	42.49%	8,748	48.15%	9,912	4.49%	925	2.27%	467	2.60%	535
Amador	42.47%	6,145	48.98%	7,087	4.10%	593	2.14%	310	2.30%	333
Calaveras	41.33%	7,213	48.35%	8,438	5.03%	878	2.51%	438	2.78%	484
Mariposa	40.85%	3,058	50.11%	3,751	3.95%	296	2.48%	186	2.60%	195
Plumas	40.46%	3,489	50.64%	4,367	4.01%	346	2.59%	223	2.29%	198
Siskiyou	40.26%	6,512	50.11%	8,104	4.74%	767	2.50%	405	2.38%	385
Inyo	40.05%	2,503	50.06%	3,128	4.66%	291	2.98%	186	2.25%	141
Colusa	39.97%	1,909	54.00%	2,579	2.62%	125	1.19%	57	2.22%	106
Placer	39.99%	47,338	52.23%	61,815	4.38%	5,190	1.94%	2,291	1.46%	1,727
Orange	39.34%	274,675	52.18%	364,291	4.74%	33,114	1.78%	12,418	1.95%	13,655
Tehama	39.12%	6,932	52.38%	9,283	3.96%	701	1.64%	291	2.90%	514
El Dorado	38.86%	25,406	51.88%	33,916	4.81%	3,144	2.72%	1,780	1.72%	1,128
Madera	38.66%	11,299	53.84%	15,733	3.43%	1,002	1.69%	494	2.39%	696
Tulare	38.47%	25,953	55.45%	37,411	2.77%	1,870	1.30%	880	2.00%	1,350
Kern	38.51%	56,558	53.70%	78,875	4.10%	6,026	1.30%	1,913	2.38%	3,496
Sutter	38.11%	8,871	54.69%	12,731	3.51%	818	1.77%	412	1.91%	446
Shasta	37.56%	21,589	54.36%	31,241	4.18%	2,405	1.76%	1,011	2.13%	1,227
Yuba	37.25%	5,067	51.90%	7,061	5.23%	711	2.26%	307	3.37%	458
Glenn	37.08%	2,714	55.40%	4,055	3.76%	275	1.50%	110	2.25%	165
Lassen	35.68%	2,994	54.02%	4,533	6.08%	510	2.28%	191	1.95%	164
Sierra	35.44%	549	51.45%	797	8.01%	124	3.68%	57	1.42%	22
Modoc	32.03%	1,159	56.72%	2,052	6.94%	251	2.18%	79	2.12%	77

== See also ==
- California state elections, 2006
- State of California
- California State Treasurer
