= Pacific Agreement on Closer Economic Relations =

The Pacific Agreement on Closer Economic Relations (PACER) is an umbrella agreement between members of the Pacific Islands Forum (the Forum Island Countries plus Australia and New Zealand) which provides a framework for the future development of trade cooperation.

It was first signed at Nauru on 18 August 2001 and entered into force on 3 October 2002. It is a framework agreement that sets an outline for the future development of trade and economic relations across the Forum region as a whole.

It does not contain substantive trade liberalisation provisions; rather it envisages a step-by-step process of trade liberalisation. This starts with a free trade agreement in goods among Pacific Island countries (PICTA – the Pacific Island Countries Trade Agreement), in the process of implementation as of September 2008, and later likely to be extended to services. PACER provides for programmes of assistance to the island country members with trade facilitation and capacity building. It also foreshadows future negotiations on Forum-wide reciprocal free trade (including Australia and New Zealand). For the moment these negotiations are not scheduled until 2011, but they are likely to be brought forward as a consequence of the Pacific Island countries' negotiation of an Economic Partnership Agreement with the European Union.

In May 2005, Forum Trade Ministers decided that there was a need to move beyond SPARTECA towards a more comprehensive framework for trade and economic cooperation between Australia, New Zealand and the FICs, as provided for under PACER, to foster economic growth, investment and employment in the Pacific region. They called for a study to investigate the potential impacts of a move towards such a comprehensive framework and for an analysis of FIC needs in regard to capacity building, trade promotion and structural reform. Terms of reference for the study were approved in 2006 and a draft of the study presented to Trade Ministers in 2007.

PACER includes a Regional Trade Facilitation Programme to improve the trading capacity of Pacific Island countries. This provides technical assistance at a regional level through the Pacific Islands Forum, the Pacific Community (SPC) and Oceania Customs Organisation on a number of key issues in regards to customs facilitation, quarantine procedures and standards and conformance assessment. This regional trade facilitation work is financially supported by New Zealand.

PACER Plus is the free trade agreement between the Forum Island Countries and Australia and New Zealand. It was opened for signature in Nuku'alofa, Tonga in June 2017 and entered into force on 13 December 2020.

A key element for improving intra-regional trade will be to improve air services and shipping links in the region, so that goods can be moved more quickly through the region and to other markets. The Pacific Islands Air Services Agreement (PIASA) which came into force in October 2007 is intended to lead to a single aviation market and bring benefits in terms of increased access to air routes between Pacific Island Countries, more airline alliances and code-sharing arrangements, and cost savings for airlines and travellers.

Progress in opening up the aviation market follows success by the region in improving shipping. In 1977 the Pacific Islands Forum set up the Pacific Forum Line a regional shipping line with the mandate to function both as a business and means of regional development. The company, headquartered in Auckland, began trading in 1978. It struggled in its early years but is now profitable. The New Zealand Government is a shareholder in the line. Work is proceeding under the Pacific Plan on options for improving feeder shipping services to a number of small island states.

On 27 January 2021, the European Union and the Pacific Islands Forum Secretariat agreed a project worth EUR 5.75 million to enhance the trade capacity of Pacific Island countries. The project titled "Strengthening Pacific Intra-Regional and International Trade (SPIRIT)” is designed to boost and increase intra-regional and international trade by strengthening institutional and technical capacity in the Pacific Island region. It will also facilitate the implementation of other trade agreements, in particular the Economic Partnership Agreement (EPA) and of the Pacific's Aid-for-Trade Strategy 2020–2025.
