= Noonan, Missouri =

Extinct hamlet in Missouri, U.S.

Coordinates: 39.460041°N 91.611269°W

Noonan is an extinct town in Ralls County, in the U.S. state of Missouri.

A post office called Noonan was established in 1892, and remained in operation until 1906. The community has the name of James Noonan, an early settler.
