= Lango language =

Lango language may refer to:

- Lango language (Uganda) - ISO 639 language code "laj"
- Lango language (South Sudan) - ISO 639 language code "lgo"
