= Chris Noonan (academic) =

New Zealand legal scholar

Chris Noonan is a New Zealand legal academic in trade, competition and company law at the University of Auckland. He was appointed the first Chief Trade Adviser to the Pacific Islands Forum in 2009, and resigned from that position in September 2011 and was succeeded by Edwini Kessie, a legal practitioner. He has a PhD and LLB from the University of Auckland.

== Education ==
Noonan was educated at the University of Auckland and gained both a PhD and LLB. His doctoral thesis was titled The emerging principles of international competition law.

== PACER Plus ==
Noonan was appointed Chief Trade Advisor in 2009 to give independent advice to the Pacific countries during their negotiations over the PACER Plus free trade agreement. The free trade agreement has been controversial with Australia being accused of bullying the smaller Pacific nations. Funding for his office was provided by Australia and had led to battles to maintain both the office's independence and it ongoing funding. Noonan resigned for personal reasons in February 2012.

== University of Auckland ==
Noonan is currently Associate Professor and Associate Dean International in the Faculty of Law at the University of Auckland. He is also an editor the New Zealand Business Law Quarterly, a New Zealand business law journal. The journal is a joint venture between the Research Centre for Business Law at The University of Auckland and Thomson Reuters NZ. It provides in depth analyses of business law issues for both a national and international legal audience.

== Trade issues ==
Noonan is consulted and cited by major New Zealand media outlets on various issues which have included the Fonterra potentially contaminated whey protein and free trade agreements.

In May 2012 he was one of the signatories on an open letter to the negotiators of the Trans-Pacific Partnership urging the rejection of investor-state dispute settlement.

== Publications ==
- Bad Poynter: International Cartels and Territorial Jurisdiction. New Zealand Business Law Quarterly, 19 (2), 138–168. 2013
- Slaughterhouse Rules: The Purpose of a Provision in the Commerce Act 1986. New Zealand Business Law Quarterly, 19 (4). 2013
- Trade Negotiations with the Pacific Islands: Promise, Process and Prognosis. New Zealand Yearbook of International Law, 9, 241–283. 2011
- Defining Directorship. Australian Journal of Corporate Law, 25, 5-26. Noonan, C. G., & Watson, S. M. (2010).
- The Emerging Principles of International Competition Law. Oxford: Oxford University Press, Oxford. Pages: 639. 2008 http://hdl.handle.net/2292/12587
- Examining Company Directors through the Lens of De Facto Directorship. Journal of Business Law, (7), 587–626. Noonan, C. G., & Watson, S. M. (2008). http://hdl.handle.net/2292/13685
- The extraterritorial application of New Zealand competition law. New Zealand Universities Law Review, 22 (3), 369–431. Susan Watson and Noonan, C. G. (2007), http://hdl.handle.net/2292/13676
- The nature of shadow directorship: ad hoc statutory intervention or core company law principle?. Journal of Business Law, Dec, 763–798. Noonan, C. G., & Watson, S. M. (2006). http://hdl.handle.net/2292/13682
