= Edward C. Noonan =

American politician

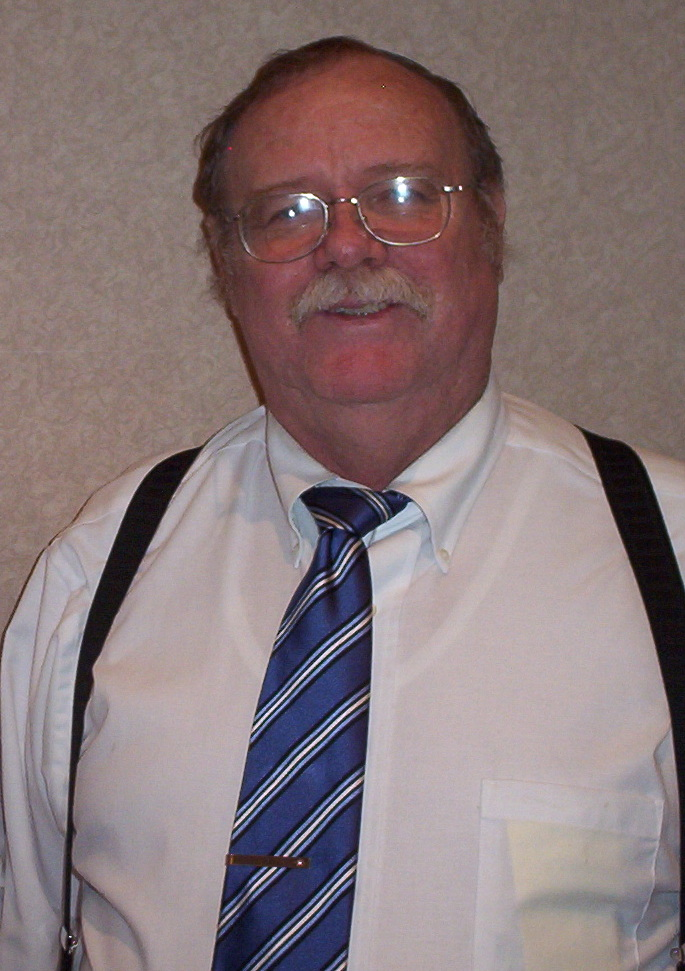
- Noonan in 2006

Chair of the American Independent Party
- In office 2006 – July 2008
- Preceded by: Nancy Spirkoff
- Succeeded by: Markham Robinson

Personal details
- Born: Edward Clifford Davis; September 25, 1948 (age 77) Prescott, Arizona, U.S.
- Party: American Resistance Party (since 2012); American Independent Party (before 2012)
- Spouse: Patricia Hansen
- Children: E. Justin Noonan
- Education: Santa Barbara City College; Sacramento City College; American River College; California State University, Sacramento

Edward Clifford Noonan (born Edward Clifford Davis on September 25, 1948 in Prescott, Arizona) is an American politician, who served as the chairman of the American Independent Party from 2006 to 2008.

== Early life, education, and personal life ==
Born on September 25, 1948 in Prescott, Arizona, Noonan attended Santa Barbara City College before serving four years in the United States Army. Following his service, Noonan attended Sacramento City College, American River College, and Sacramento State College.

Noonan is married to Patricia Hansen. They have a son, E. Justin Noonan, who was a candidate for California State Treasurer in 2006. E. Justin Noonan became the American Independent Nominee and received 93,281 votes, just over 1% of the total.

Noonan is a member of the Church of Jesus Christ of Latter-day Saints.

== Political career ==
Noonan was the winner of the 2002 AIP Primary for secretary of state of California, receiving 85,791 votes (1.2%). He similarly won the 2006 AIP Primary for governor of California in the California gubernatorial election, receiving 61,901 votes (0.7%). He was the winner of the AIP Primary for US Senate in 2010 against Barbara Boxer, in which he received 125,435 votes (1.2%). Although he filed to run for California's 2nd congressional district in 2008, he did not receive enough signatures to qualify for the ballot.
