= Edward Noonan (architect) =

American architect and real estate developer

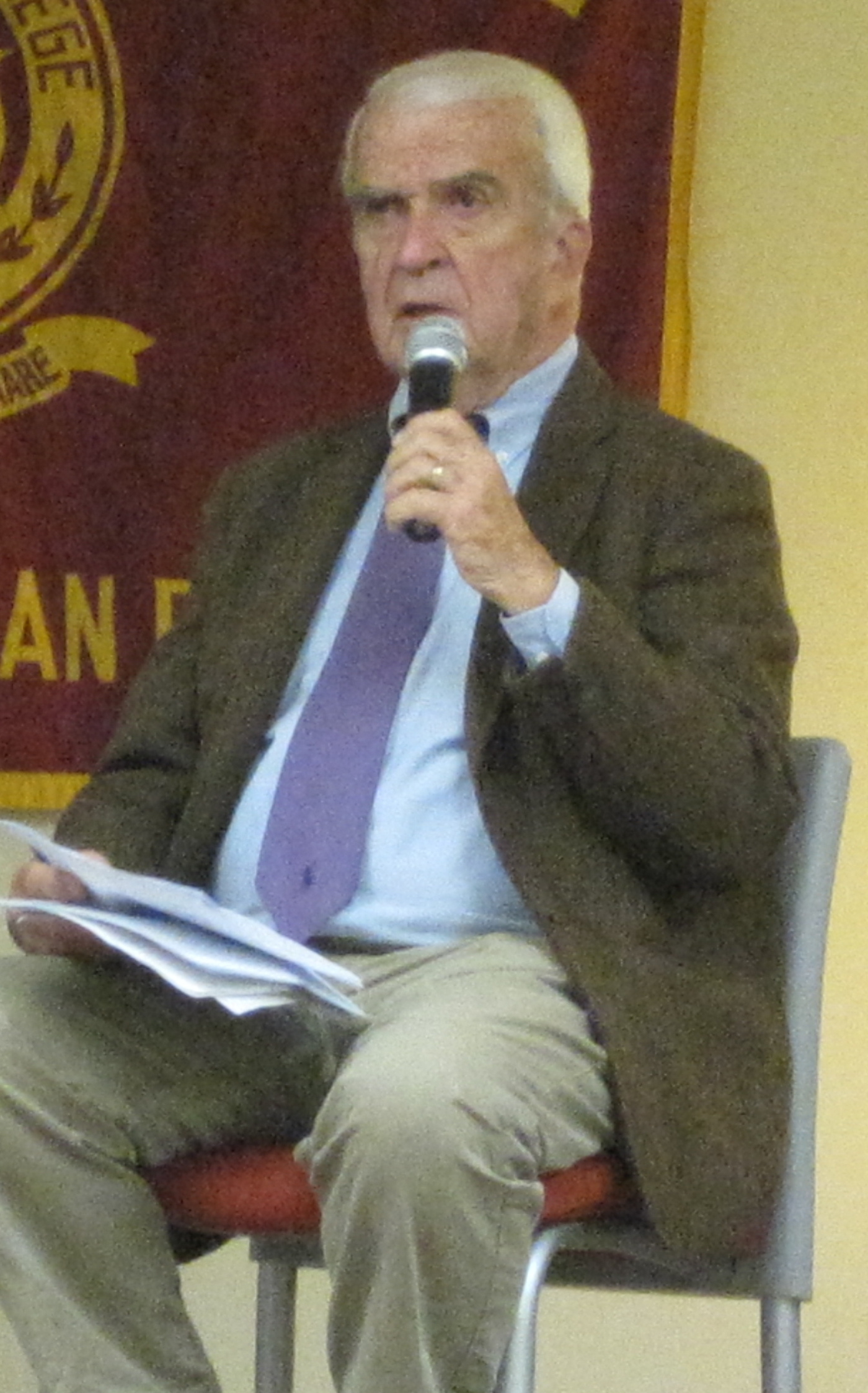
Edward Noonan speaking at Shimer College.

Edward Joseph Noonan (born May 30, 1930) is an architect and real estate developer based in Chicago, Illinois, and the former interim president of Shimer College. He is the chairman of the board of Chicago Associates Planners & Architects, and was the lead architect in the Tryon Farm development near Michigan City, Indiana.

Noonan has been associated with Shimer College since the 1990s, and was named an emeritus trustee in 2000. Following the removal of Thomas K. Lindsay from the position of president of Shimer College, he was appointed interim president effective April 20, 2010. He stepped down in 2012.
