= PACER Plus =

Multilateral free trade agreement in the South Pacific

- PACER Plus members. Signed but not ratified. Participated in negotiations. Other members of the Pacific Islands Forum eligible to join.
- Type: Trade agreement
- Effective: 13 December 2020
- Signatories: 11; Australia; Cook Islands; Kiribati; Nauru; New Zealand; Niue; Samoa; Solomon Islands; Tonga; Tuvalu; Vanuatu
- Parties: 10; Australia (20 December 2018); Cook Islands (14 October 2020); Kiribati; New Zealand (24 October 2018); Niue (3 July 2020); Samoa (22 July 2019); Solomon Islands (22 June 2020); Tonga (27 March 2020); Tuvalu (2 February 2022); Vanuatu (12 August 2022)

PACER Plus is a free trade agreement between members of the Pacific Islands Forum (the Forum Island Countries plus Australia and New Zealand). The agreement expands the existing Pacific Agreement on Closer Economic Relations (PACER) to include further trade liberalisation and development assistance. It entered into force on 13 December 2020.

== History ==
Negotiations on the agreement began in 2009, and were completed in April 2017. It was opened for signature in Nuku'alofa, Tonga, in June 2017 and was initially signed by eleven countries: Australia, Cook Islands, Kiribati, Nauru, New Zealand, Niue, Samoa, Solomon Islands, Tonga, Tuvalu and Vanuatu.

The agreement needed to be ratified by eight signatories to come into force. New Zealand was the first to ratify it, in October 2018, followed by Australia in December 2018, Samoa in July 2019, the Solomon Islands in June 2020, and Niue in July 2020. Kiribati and Tonga also ratified it. The Cook Islands ratified on 13 October 2020, the eighth country to do so. The treaty entered into force two months after the eighth ratification. In August 2024, Fiji announced they would re-evaluate joining in PACER Plus.

== Criticism ==
The value of the agreement to the Pacific is disputed. Fiji and Papua New Guinea, the two largest Pacific island economies, have refused to join, significantly undermining the value of the deal to the Pacific. The removal of tariffs on imported Australian and New Zealand goods is expected to cause a significant loss of revenue to Pacific governments. The Pacific Network on Globalisation has called the agreement "unbalanced" as key provisions on aid and labour mobility are non-binding.
