= Doddington gang =

Organised crime group in Manchester, England

Doddington Original Gangsters
- Founded: Late 1980s
- Founding location: Alexandra Park Estate, Moss Side, Manchester
- Years active: 1980s to present
- Territory: Moss Side, Ardwick, Longsight, Hulme, Stretford, Leeds and Sheffield
- Ethnicity: Primarily Afro-Caribbean, multi-ethnic Black British
- Membership (est.): 200
- Criminal activities: Drug trafficking, weapon trafficking, robbery, kidnapping, murder
- Allies: Moss Side Bloods, Longsight Crew, Haydock Close Crew, Portuguese Mafia, Active Only, Top Crash Gang, Paul Massey (gangster)
- Rivals: Gooch Close Gang, Younger Gooch Close, Cheetham Hill Gang, Longsight Street Soldiers, Pit Bull Crew, Fallowfield Mad Dogs, Old Trafford Crips, Rusholme Crew Gangsters

The Doddington Original Gangsters, also known as the D.O.G, are a primarily Afro-Caribbean street gang in Manchester, United Kingdom. Originating from the Pepperhill Crew, the gang was named after its headquarters in Doddington Close, and it controlled the east side of the Alexandra Park estate in Moss Side.

The gang became rivals of the Cheetham Hill Gang and the Gooch Close Gang during the late 1980s and early 1990s, leading to the infamous Gunchester era in Manchester gangland history.

== History ==
The Doddington Gang traces its roots to the Pepperhill Mob, which emerged in the 1980s around the Pepperhill pub on the east side of Alexandra Park estate in Moss Side. After sustained police pressure, the gang migrated to nearby Doddington Close and adopted a new, slightly misspelt name.

== Gang wars ==
=== Pepperhill vs Cheetham Hill ===
By the late 1980s, Moss Side's Alexandra Park estate emerged as highly lucrative drug dealing territory, reportedly earning £11 million per year for the Pepperhill Mob. This led to the larger and more established Cheetham Hill Gang levying a 'tax' on the Moss Side dealers for their profits, often by threat of violence.

The Pepperhill Mob, rich and well armed despite their youth, fought back. The two gangs vied with each other in stabbings, tit-for-tat shootings and murder, including the high-profile killing of Anthony "Scratch" Gardner on Saturday, 9 January 1988. Police suspect the killer was the bodyguard of the leader of the Cheetham Hill Gang, Anthony "White Tony" Johnson. White Tony was himself shot to death three years later.

=== Doddington Gang vs Gooch Close Gang ===
In the early 1990s, the Pepperhill/Doddington group developed a fierce rivalry with the Gooch Close Gang. The rivalry centered around control of the lucrative drug trade in Moss Side; the Gooch, aligned with the Cheetham Hill Gang and the larger Westside Gooch faction, started a violent turf war that divided the estate and resulted in two decades of gang-related shootings.

This feud and the resulting bloodshed, escalating throughout the 1990s, led local newspapers to dub Manchester "Gunchester".

By 1992, gun violence had soared. The Greater Manchester Police intervened with Operation China, resulting in numerous arrests from both factions and achieving brief reductions in hostilities. Gang elders even attempted truce talks and symbolic football matches by late 1992–93. Despite these efforts, the truce would collapse, leading to an even bloodier gang war in the late 1990s and 2000s. The two gangs would be locked in this feud for over twenty years.

== Doddington Civil War ==
By the mid-1990s, pressures from continuous conflict, years of incarceration, and shifting power dynamics fostered unrest within the Doddington Gang. Reports suggested Doddington's more hardcore members were taxing their own dealers, while Greater Manchester Police identified a power struggle between two Doddington factions. One side appeared to be a group including Owen Roach, Darryl Laycock and Shae Cole. The other was Raymond Pitt, his brothers and friends.

In July 1995, Nicholas "Sailor" Murphy—a prominent figure within the gang—was killed by his own members. Shortly thereafter, Raymond Pitt was executed in a drive-by shooting on Hulme’s West Indian Social Club grounds. Later, Darryl Laycock was shot 27 times by three men. These high-profile shootings destabilized the gang’s leadership core.

=== Formation of the Pit Bull Crew ===
After the death of his brother and being released from a young offender institution, Thomas "Tommy" Pitt formed the Pit Bull Crew. His rapid recruitment of young boys led the Crew to become a well-established member of the local drug trade. A rival offshoot of the Doddington gang, the Longsight Crew (composed of younger Doddington members from the Longsight and Ardwick areas) attempted to sell in the areas occupied by the Pit Bull Crew, resulting in yet another turf war.

The Pit Bull Crew paradoxically aligned itself with the Gooch gang, deepening the violent divisions not only between Doddington and Gooch but within Doddington's own ranks. This Crew remained a feared force under the Gooch umbrella.

The emergence of the Pit Bull Crew shattered any unity in Doddington. Internal rivalries escalated into lethal conflict, with former friends now forced into opposing camps. Former associates found themselves targeted not only by Gooch but also by factions of their own former gang. In 2002, Pitt was given a life sentence for his many gang-related crimes.

This turmoil contributed to an intensification of violence throughout the late 1990s and early 2000s, with Doddington's internal civil war becoming one of several fronts in the broader South Manchester gang battlefield.

== Alliances and Splinter Groups ==
In response to their rivalry with the Gooch, both gangs spawned junior factions. Doddington gave rise to the Moss Side Bloods, the Longsight Crew, the Haydock Close Crew and the Portuguese Mafia. These gangs continued hostilities into the 2000s. Meanwhile, Gooch formed alliances with splinter groups including the Pit Bull Crew, Rusholme Crips, Fallowfield Mandem/Mad Dogs, Old Trafford Cripz, and Longsight Street Soldiers—further fragmenting the gang landscape.

In 2004, members of the Gooch gang and Longsight Crew fought each other in the Manchester Royal Infirmary.

== See also ==
- Gun crime in south Manchester
