= 2020 Manchester stabbing =

Gang related murder

- Location: Moss Side, Manchester, England, UK
- Date: 26 July 2020 c. 7:30 p.m. (GMT)
- Deaths: 1
- Injuries: 3

On 26 July 2020, 4 people were stabbed in Moss Side in Manchester, England. 17-year-old Mohamoud Mohamed died at the scene. The incident was the result of a gangland feud between Rusholme Crips and Moss Side's AO, or, 'Active Only'. Both gangs are believed to have grown out of Manchester's notorious Gooch and Doddington outfits.

The attack happened a month after a shooting in the same area that killed two people.

== Incident and conviction ==
Police were called to a disturbance in Henbury Street, Moss Side, at 7:30 pm. A murder investigation was launched following the death of one of the victims, teenager Mohamoud Mohamed. The alleged perpetrators and members of Moss Side's AO were arrested the next day. On 12 February 2021, four men were convicted of manslaughter: Daneaco Reid (19); Jamall Walters (18); Romeo Daley (18); and an unidentified 17-year-old were all arrested and charged with murder.

== Music ==
"It's the latest case when rap and drill lyrics have been the dark undercurrent to shocking crimes on the streets of Manchester." Members of the two rival Manchester gangs would often release music and videos taunting and threatening each other, which some believe has led to more violence. In court, some of the music from AO's members was played, lyrics to one particular track said: "I swear that's Mo let's kill him, kill him...". The gang members and music artists often express their allegiance in music through the use of certain hand signals, and wearing different colours, Moss Side's AO wearing the red bandana, and Rusholme Crips wearing light blue.
