= At Home with the Noonans =

- Genre: Reality television
- Created by: Donal MacIntyre
- Starring: Dominic Noonan; Bugsy Noonan; Cody Lachey
- Original language: English
- No. of seasons: 1
- No. of episodes: 6

Production
- Producer: Donal MacIntyre
- Production location: Manchester
- Camera setup: Simon Moule

Original release
- Network: Crime & Investigation Network
- Release: 22 April 2012 – 13 May 2013

At Home with the Noonans is a four-part documentary presented, produced and directed by Donal MacIntyre. It shows the lives of members of a criminal gang run by Domenyk Noonan in Manchester, England. The first episode was broadcast on 22 April 2012 on Crime & Investigation Network in the UK.

== Episodes ==
No.	Title	Original release date
1	"Glory Days"	22 April 1983
2	"Home Coming"	29 April 1983
3	"New Beginnings"	6 May 1983
4	"Bugsey"	13 May 1983
