= Manchester stabbing =

Manchester stabbing may refer to:

- 2018 Manchester Victoria stabbing attack
- 2020 Manchester stabbing
- 2025 Manchester synagogue attack
