= Dominic Noonan =

English gangster and sex offender

Domenyk Lattlay-Fottfoy
- Born: Dominic James Noonan; 13 June 1964 (age 62); Manchester, United Kingdom
- Known for: Criminality
- Criminal charges: Armed robbery, arson, fraud, prison escape, witness intimidation, sexual assault
- Criminal status: Released on Licence
- Children: Stephen "Bugsy Noonan" Warburton

Domenyk Lattlay-Fottfoy (born Dominic James Noonan, 13 June 1964) is an English gangster and sex offender. With his brother Desmond "Dessie" Noonan, he headed a criminal organisation or "crime firm" in Manchester, England during the 1980s and 1990s and is a member of one of Manchester's most infamous crime families.

Noonan has more than 40 convictions for a wide range of offences including armed robbery, police assault, possession of firearms, prison escape, and fraud, and as of 2013 had spent 22 years in prisons across Britain. His most recent conviction was for indecent assault and attempted rape.

== Name ==
He assumed the name of Domenyk Lattlay-Fottfoy by deed poll. His adopted surname is an acronym for "Look After Those That Look After You – Fuck Off Those That Fuck Off You".

== Criminal activities ==
The Noonan family first rose to notoriety in the Manchester gang scene after the murder of Anthony "White Tony" Johnson, the leader of the Cheetham Hill Gang, who was gunned down in 1991.

On 9 August 2011, during the 2011 England riots, Noonan was caught on film talking to looters in Manchester city centre.

On 27 October 2012, Noonan was charged under his adopted name by Greater Manchester Police in connection with the alleged rape and false imprisonment of a fifteen-year-old boy in Manchester. He was recalled to prison because the charges amounted to a breach of the conditions of his release on an earlier unrelated matter. The charges were dropped in October 2013, at which point he was still being held in custody. The Crown Prosecution Service said that "This has not been an easy decision, balancing the rights and expectations of the complainant and the need to ensure a fair trial. In all the circumstances, we cannot continue with the prosecution..."

In early 2016, Noonan was sentenced to 11 years in prison after being convicted of arson, blackmail and perverting the course of justice.

In May 2018 he was convicted of 13 historic sex offences against under-aged males and was given a further 11-year sentence to begin after the completion of his current sentence.

In 2014, his son Stephen Warburton – known as Bugsy Noonan – was imprisoned for 38 months after bragging of his part in a £250,000 car-ringing conspiracy.

In late October 2025, Lattlay-Fottfoy was unexpectedly released from prison on licence after serving a total of seven years of his consecutive sentences. His early release attracted local media attention and public scrutiny, given the prior judicial directive that his 2018 sentence for historic sexual offences run consecutively to his 2016 convictions. Following his release, he remains subject to strict Multi-Agency Public Protection Arrangements (MAPPA) and lifelong sex offender registration conditions.

Dom is currently in prison at HMP Moorlands on a VP wing serving a sentence for sex offenses. He regularly boasts about all his “jobs” and makes no secret of the fact that he's a former gangster.

== Documentary ==
Dominic Noonan and his brother Desmond Noonan were the subject of the 2005 documentary A Very British Gangster (or MacIntyre's Underworld) directed by Donal MacIntyre. During the documentary Dominic Noonan is asked by MacIntyre about rumours that he is homosexual. "Without missing a beat Noonan openly admits that he's gay."
