= Moss Side mass shooting =

- 2018 Moss Side mass shooting
- 2020 Moss Side shooting
