= Mohamoud Mohamed =

Mohamoud Mohamed may refer to:

- Ahmed Mohamed Mohamoud (born 1936), Somaliland politician, former President
- Mohamoud Mohamed Guled (born 1954), Somali politician
- Mohamoud Mohamed (born 2003), a victim of the 2020 Manchester stabbing
- Mohamed Ahmed Mohamoud, Somali politician
- Hussein Mohamed Mohamoud, Somali politician
