= Donal MacIntyre =

Irish investigative journalist

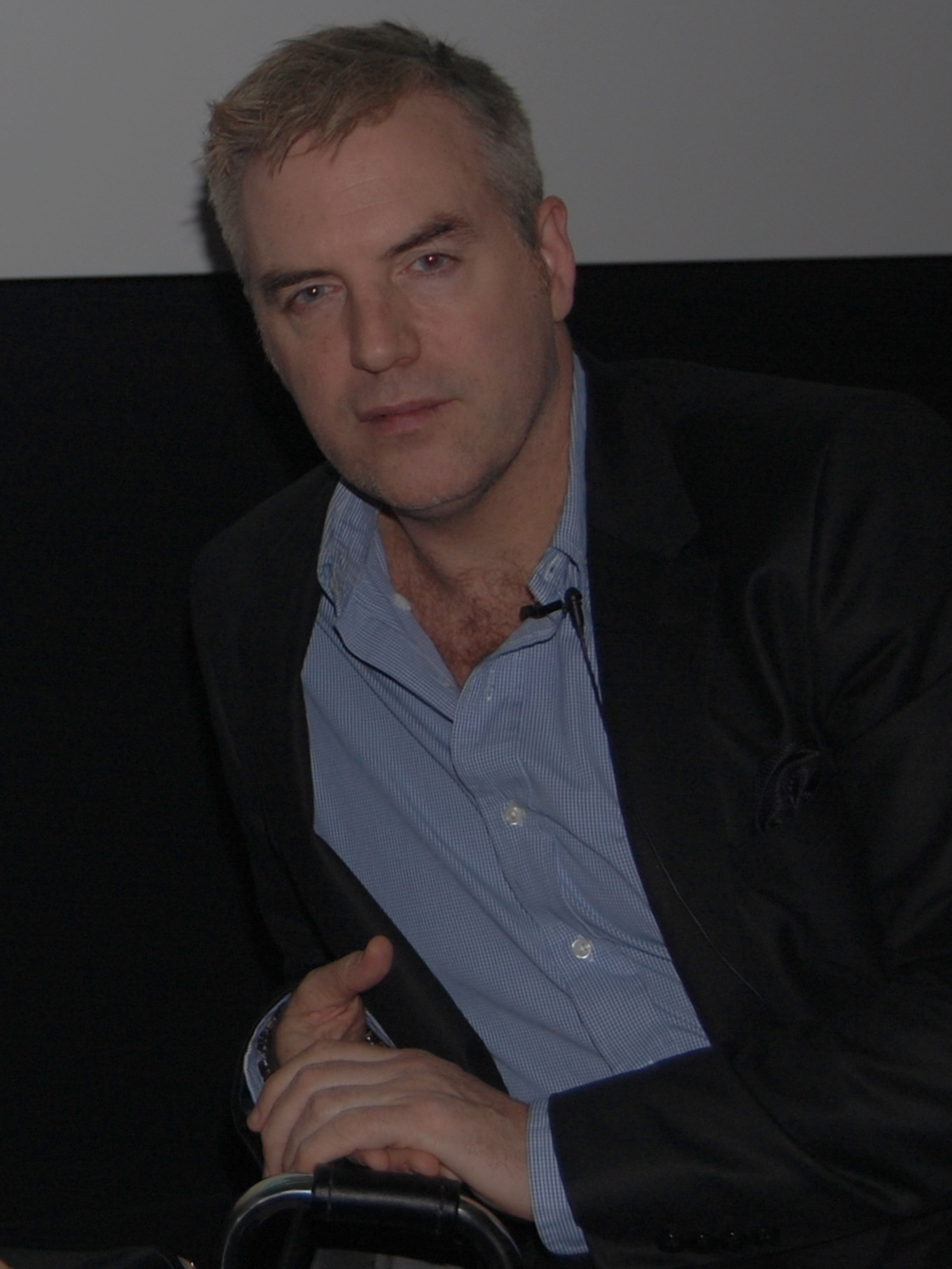
- MacIntyre in 2013
- Born: Dublin, Ireland
- Occupation: Journalist
- Notable credits: World in Action; MacIntyre Undercover; MacIntyre Investigates; Street Crime Live; CCTV Cities; London Tonight; At Home with the Noonans; The Trade in Rare Mountain Gorillas; Macintyre's Toughest Towns; Cheap as Chimps
- Donal MacIntyre's voice recorded November 2013
- Website: Official website

Donal MacIntyre is an Irish investigative journalist, specialising in investigations, undercover operations and television exposés. He has also worked as a presenter of both television news and documentaries on various UK channels.

In 2007, MacIntyre directed A Very British Gangster, which premiered at the Sundance Film Festival. From April 2010, he presented ITV's local news show London Tonight for a few months.

In 2009, MacIntyre took part in the fourth series of Dancing on Ice, where he was runner-up to Ray Quinn. In 2014, he participated in the first series of The Jump where he was runner-up to Joe McElderry.

MacIntyre has also worked for the CBS Reality channel, including as presenter of the documentary series Donal MacIntyre: Unsolved, in which he investigates a number of well noted "cold cases" for which the police have never been able to reach a conclusion.

== Early life ==
MacIntyre was educated in Dublin and London, and completed a Master's degree in Communication Policy at City University, London.

== Career ==
After graduation he worked as a newspaper reporter for the Sunday Tribune and later with The Irish Press in Dublin, covering finance, sports and news. He undertook his first investigative reporting into the Law Society investigating allegations of restrictive practises. He then wrote similar investigative articles for The Guardian, The Daily Mail, The Sunday Express and the New Statesman.

MacIntyre began his television career at the BBC on the investigative sports strand On-The-Line in 1993. In the wake of the Lyme Regis canoeing disaster in which four school children drowned, his canoeing experience made him the natural choice to investigate the incident and the safety culture that had allowed it. He went undercover as an Adventure Sports Instructor to expose the lack of employment standards in the industry. This investigation led to the development of MacIntyre's distinctive investigative reporting style, which he explained as being present for the story, rather than merely reporting accounts of it:

I think print can be very reactive. It just means getting on the end of a phone and getting a quote. For TV it doesn't happen unless it's filmed and that means you have to be there. Our particular brand is called Show Me television - we don't tell you, we show you.

The first series of MacIntyre Investigates for the BBC caused some controversy when it was accused of falsifying video evidence and blackmail during its exposé of the Elite modelling agency. The BBC was sued for defamation, avoided court through a settlement, and issued a statement admitting that MacIntyre had misrepresented the agency in his programme, but that they stood by him.

Towards the end of his second series of MacIntyre Investigates for the BBC, he came under more open criticism from internal sources. The three programmes were suggested to have cost as much as £2.5 million, while an episode of Panorama by contrast typically cost £100,000 to £150,000. In return, BBC One's then controller Lorraine Heggessey expected MacIntyre Investigates to deliver the ratings, a pressure that other investigative journalists believed undermined its editorial integrity.

In 2007, MacIntyre set out to create a documentary because he wanted to "do a Michael Moore for gangsters," in penetrating a world of super-rich villains who enjoy a life of luxury with no legitimate means of support: "It was interesting to make a 180-degree turn from my covert-reporting heritage and have full access. I wanted to build a bond."

The resulting production became a film with the title A Very British Gangster which centred on the life of Manchester-based gangster and hit man Dominic Noonan, whose brother Desmond Noonan was stabbed to death during filming.

MacIntyre directed the anti-smoking commercials for the SMOKE IS POISON campaign. This series included the Polonium commercial that the British Government banned out of sensitivity to the family of the murdered Russian dissident Alexander Litvinenko who was killed using the substance.

From 6 April 2008 MacIntyre has presented a weekly radio show on BBC Radio 5 Live.

In June 2009, both he and his wife were attacked and beaten at the Cloud 9 wine bar in Hampton Court in what is believed to have been a revenge attack, linked to the prosecution of Jason Marriner and other Chelsea hooligans in the 1999 documentary.

In 2010, MacIntyre briefly co-hosted ITV1's local news show London Tonight, stepping down after six months in the post.

He writes for Sunday World and is a visiting professor of criminology at Birmingham City University in which capacity he has been a panelist on the Crime Bites Podcast.

=== Dancing on Ice ===
In 2009, MacIntyre took part in the fourth series of the television series Dancing on Ice. He and his pro-skating partner Florentine Houdiniere were the runners up.

=== The Jump ===
MacIntyre took part in the first series of Channel 4 reality series The Jump in 2014. Initially signed as a reserve in case of injury to other participants, he took the place of the incapacitated Melinda Messenger from the fifth night (30 January 2014). He finished the series second to Joe McElderry, who had also initially been a reserve contestant.

== See also ==
- At Home with the Noonans
- Chris Clark, British crime writer and documentary maker who also focuses on unsolved crimes
