= Gun crime in south Manchester =

Gun crimes in south Manchester in which guns are used

Gun crime in south Manchester, England, largely took place in an inner city area south of Manchester city centre, from Hulme through Moss Side to Longsight, with further crime also taking place north of the city, in areas like Cheetham Hill. By the 1990s, the trade in illegal narcotics and firearms had given rise to the nickname "Gunchester", although from the late 2000s levels of gang related gun crime greatly reduced in the area, attributed to heavy sentencing of the main offenders, restricting the availability of firearms, community work and co-operation in tackling serious crime between agencies.

== History ==
Gun crime in south Manchester began in the 1970s with rising unemployment and poverty in the area, which is a centre of Manchester's Black British/Afro-Caribbean community. Finding it difficult to make a living from legitimate means, some residents turned to the drug trade, mainly the sale of cannabis. Most of the conflict was centred around the Moss Side precinct, where youths would sell cannabis or heroin. After police cracked down, the sellers moved to the Alexandra Park estate in Moss Side.

In the early 1990s, the use of firearms by criminals in south Manchester soared along with gang associations related to their patch, such as Gooch Close, Doddington Close and the Pepperhill pub. South Manchester gangs engaged in feuds with each other for the control of the drug trade. Shootings and murders increased in frequency in the area. This started attracting negative news and media headlines, with the nickname of 'Gunchester' being used to sum up this increase in gang, drug and firearms activity.

Gun related violence featured throughout the 1990s. In January 1993, 14-year-old Benji Stanley was shot dead as he queued for an Alvino's takeaway in Moss Side. The reasons surrounding his shooting are not fully known and no one has ever been prosecuted for this crime.

In the mid-1990s, Greater Manchester Police started developing new approaches to confronting gun crime in south Manchester which initially met with limited success. These started with Operation China, which aimed at targeting gang members and taking them out of circulation.

By the late 1990s, gun related killings had increased with the nature of shootings changing, becoming more reckless and often seem to take place over petty disputes, such as a row over a girl or ownership of a bike, and rarely over drug dealing "turf". 1996 saw 28 confirmed shootings with 12 wounded and four dead. In 1997, there were 68 confirmed shootings, with 39 injuries and six deaths. In 1999, more shots were fired in the Manchester area than in any other year, at least 270 (based on found casings), with the majority being in the south Manchester areas of Longsight, Moss Side and Hulme. In 1999, there were 43 gun related injuries and seven fatalities.

=== Gun crime fatalities by area: 1999–2009 ===
Area	Year											
Area	1999	2000	2001	2002	2003	2004	2005	2006	2007	2008	2009	TOTAL
Ardwick	1	2	–	–	–	–	–	–	–	–	–	3
Beswick	1	–	–	–	–	–	–	–	–	–	–	1
Chorlton-cum-Hardy	1	–	–	–	–	–	–	–	–	–	–	1
Chorlton-on-Medlock	–	–	–	–	–	–	–	–	2	–	–	2
Fallowfield	–	–	–	–	1	–	–	–	–	–	–	1
Gorton	–	–	–	–	–	–	–	–	3	–	–	1
Hulme	1	–	–	–	–	–	1	–	–	–	–	2
Levenshulme	–	1	–	–	–	–	–	–	–	–	–	1
Longsight	1	2	5	1	–	–	–	–	–	–	1	10
Moss Side	1	–	–	–	1	1	–	2	2	–	–	7
Rusholme	–	–	–	–	–	–	–	–	–	–	–	–
Old Trafford	1	–	–	–	–	–	2	–	–	–	–	3
Stretford	–	–	–	–	–	1	–	–	–	1	1	3
Whalley Range	–	1	–	–	–	–	–	–	–	–	–	1
Withington	1	–	–	–	–	–	–	–	–	2	–	3
TOTAL	8	6	5	1	2	2	3	2	5	3	2	39

=== Multiagency response to gun crime ===
In 2001 a multi-agency approach to tackling gun crime was initiated when the Manchester Multi Agency Gang Strategy (MMAGS) was introduced as a result of the Home Office 1999 Tilley and Bullock report. A new approach to tackling gun crime began to develop with police working more closely with the local community and other agencies.

The high rate of shooting incidents continued into the early 2000s, though gradually the number of gun murders declined to a much lower rate. April 2004 saw panic at Manchester Royal Infirmary as rival gangs spotted each other after a shooting and ran through the building with guns in the air.

Bearing similarities to the death of Benji Stanley 13 years earlier, 15-year-old Jessie James was killed on 9 September 2006, cycling home from a party with friends. The youngest victim since Benji Stanley, his was also believed to be a case of mistaken identity, with the police maintaining he wasn't involved in any of the area's gang and drug related activities. Similarly, the lack of witnesses willing to come forward has prevented his killers being identified and brought to justice.

In 2007, the Manchester Evening News reported a consistent decrease in firearms incidents over a period of two years, which it attributed to the work of Xcalibre, Greater Manchester Police's specialist task force. Xcalibre received a funding boost of £6.5 million in June 2008 A police spokesman said that the recent Operation Cougar has had a "massive impact" on gang related shootings in the area and it was hoped the new money would help build on that success.

A combination of targeting key offenders, along with diversionary activities and better communication with the local community, through working closely with local authorities, including child protection and other agencies, appears to have been effective in cutting gang related firearms incidents.

== 1999-2009 ==
=== Imprisonment of the Gooch gang ===
Ten members of south Manchester's Gooch gang were put on trial in October 2008 for a catalogue of gang-related crimes. Gang members Colin Joyce and Lee Amos had been arrested in 2000, when they had been apprehended at their 'nerve centre' in a house in Moss Side, found with an 'extraordinary array of firearms'. In 2001, they had been sentenced to nine years in prison but had been released early, on licence, in 2007 and there had followed a new bout of shootings.

In April 2009, Joyce and Amos were among 11 members of the 'Gooch gang' who were found guilty of a 'catalogue of crimes' they had been charged with, which included the murders of Ucal Chin and Tyrone Gilbert. These convictions were hailed by Manchester's chief prosecutor, John Holt, as having 'enormous significance for public safety'. Their trials were held 35 miles away at Liverpool Crown Court to lower the risk of witness intimidation from other gang members. Not unusually, the perpetrators of gun crime were also victims of it, with Amos's brother Stephen Baba-Tunde Amos having been shot dead aged 21 in a gang-related shooting outside a bar in Ashton-under-Lyne in 2002.

Colin Joyce, aged 29, known as the leader of the gang, was given a minimum 39-year sentence. Lee Amos was sentenced to receive at least 35 years. Three other members of the gang were given minimum sentences of between 30 and 35 years.

=== Shootings in Stretford and Longsight ===
Optimism about the reduction in gun crime in the south Manchester area was tarnished by the shooting dead of 16-year-old Ardwick resident Giuseppe Gregory outside the Robin Hood pub in Stretford on 10 May 2009. He was someone who had been noted for an association with gang members and police had sought to warn him of the dangers by delivering a note to his home address in November 2008, in accordance with Operation Cougar policy of treating potential young gang members as children at risk.

Following the shooting, there was some apprehension about the possibility of reprisals but shootings continue to be at an historically low level, with only one fatal gang related shooting in 15 months.

On 3 December 2009 Khurram Ashraf, a 30-year-old student, was shot outside a money exchange in Longsight, later dying in hospital. The motive appears to have been robbery, with a laptop and £10,000 in cash thought to have been missing. It did not initially appear to be gang related.

=== Comments of Chris Grayling ===
Comments of Chris Grayling, Conservative Shadow Home Secretary, in August 2009, comparing Moss Side to the Baltimore set TV series The Wire met with an angry response in the area, from locals and the police. Having been out on patrol for a day with the police, observing the results of a shooting at a house, he described himself as having witnessed an "urban war" and said "It's the world of the drama series The Wire". Police responded that gang related shootings in Greater Manchester had fallen by 82 percent on the previous year, and that to speak of "urban war" was "sensationalistic". They said that he had not taken account of their achievements in pursuing a multi agency approach to tackling gun crime in the area.

Local councillor Roy Walters complained of the Moss Side unfairly being a "negative target" due to historical associations. Sticking by his comments, he said, "I didn't say Moss Side equals Baltimore. What I said is that we have in Moss Side symptoms of a gang conflict in this country which I find profoundly disturbing". Baltimore, with a population of about 600,000, was noted as having 191 gun related murders in the past year, in comparison to Moss Side, which had none.

== Community attitudes ==
In the wake of the Gooch gang prosecutions, Chief Constable of Greater Manchester Police, Peter Fahy, referred to the need to keep guns off the streets. He spoke of working with the local community with the aim of identifying those at risk of being drawn into gang membership and educating them as to the consequences of involvement in such activities.

Some newspapers have reported a change coming from within the community in the area of Moss Side, in particular, where there have been no gun fatalities for over three years, reporting that "Moss Siders feel that change is running more deeply than the police's work in winning convictions for the Gooch gang". Patsy McKie, whose son was shot dead over ten years ago, in a row over a bike, was reported as saying "People are standing up and saying, we don't want this any more, and the young people are taking notice". Local councillor, Alistair Cox, noted "People had been very frightened, understandably. But witness protection schemes and an absolute transformation in policing have changed that".

== See also ==
- Gangs in the United Kingdom
- Crime in the United Kingdom
