= Christ Church, Moss Side =

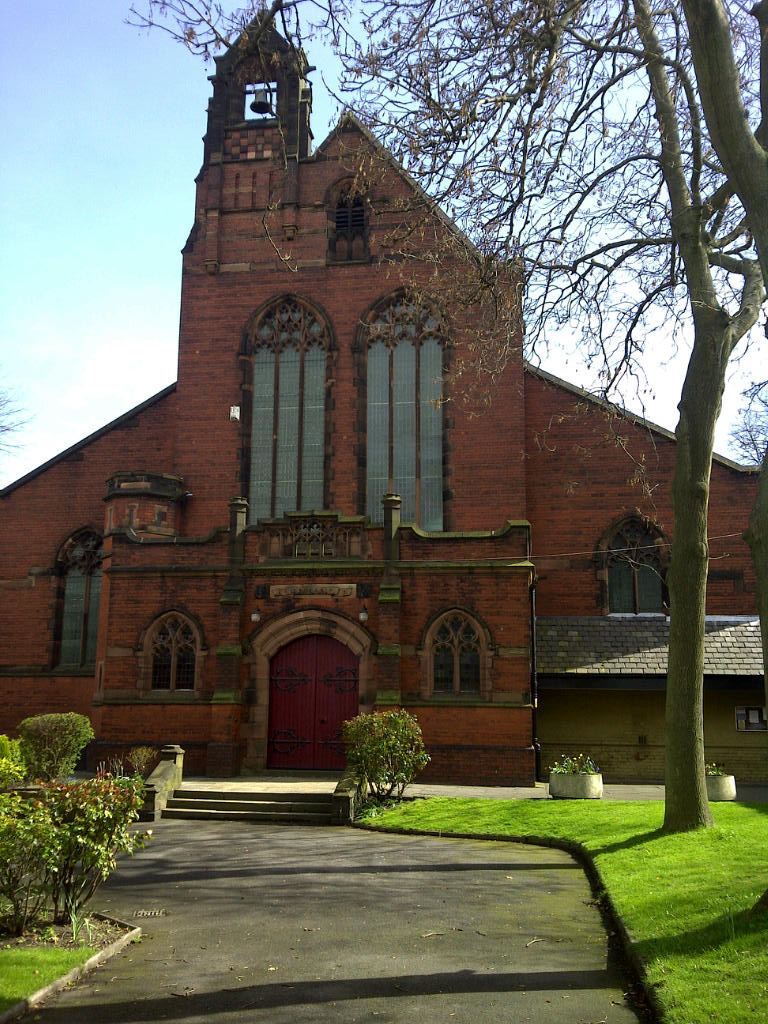

- Location in Manchester
- 53.4592°N 2.2362°W
- OS grid reference: SJ 84414 95852
- Location: Moss Side, Manchester
- Country: England
- Denomination: Church of England

History
- Founded: 1896
- Dedication: Christ

Architecture
- Heritage designation: Grade II*
- Designated: 24 April 1987
- Architect: W. Cecil Hardisty

Administration
- Diocese: Manchester
- Archdeaconry: Manchester

Clergy
- Priest: Rev. Richard Hume

Christ Church in Lloyd Street North, Moss Side, Manchester, England, is an Anglican church of 1899–1904 by W. Cecil Hardisty. It was designated a Grade II* listed building on 24 April 1987.

The church is of red brick in an "Arts and Crafts Perpendicular" style. Pevsner considered it Hardisty's "best (building) in Manchester". Decoration is concentrated on the west front, "where a bellcote sits roguishly on one shank of the gable". Most of the original furnishings have gone, although some replacement pieces have been brought in from demolished churches—such as the reredos from St Edward, Holbeck, Leeds.

== See also ==
- List of churches in Greater Manchester
- Grade II* listed buildings in Greater Manchester
- Listed buildings in Manchester-M14
