= Cheetham Hill Gang =

Cheetham Hill "Hillbillies" Gang
- Founded: 1980s or earlier
- Founding location: Cheetham Hill, Manchester
- Years active: 1980s–present
- Territory: Manchester
- Ethnicity: Primarily Afro-Caribbean, British Pakistani, Black British and British Jamaicans
- Membership (est.): 100
- Criminal activities: Drug trafficking, weapon trafficking, armed robbery, kidnapping, prostitution, extortion, racketeering, contract killing, money laundering
- Allies: British crime firms
- Rivals: Pepperhill Mob, Doddington

The Cheetham Hill Gang, also known as the Hillbillies, is an organised crime group based in Cheetham, Manchester, England. Most members of the gang grew up or lived in one of the four areas of Cheetham Hill: Waterloo, Huxley, the Halliwell Estate and Heywood Street Estate.

== History ==
The Cheetham Hill Gang had become established by the early 1980s, following turf wars with other gangs from Moss Side and Salford. These conflicts intensified in the early 1990s over the drug trade and the control of Manchester's club scene. By the mid-1990s, the rivalry had been largely taken over by younger members of each gang and developed into a war over reputation and respect in the city.

The gang's rivalry with Moss Side often spilled into city centre bars and clubs. Its members would force their way into bars and nightclubs to sell drugs openly while drinking champagne and other alcohol without paying. This led to physical clashes with many of Manchester's doormen and club owners, who were intimidated by gang members and feared repercussions. One such incident led to a rival gangster from Moss Side being stabbed in the head during a jungle drum and bass rave at Sankey's Soap Nightclub in Manchester. Another incident led to two leading gangsters from Rusholme being stabbed in the neck outside another club, the Music Box. In the late 1990s, doormen at clubs such as the Isobar, Piccadilly 21's, The Haçienda, Saturdays, The Gallery, and Club Havana were attacked.

Later, The Gooch Close Gang often bought and sold drugs to Cheetham Hill. The Gooch had close ties to Cheetham Hill, with the cousin of the Cheetham Hill Gang's head being a leading figure in the Gooch. Delroy Brown (leader of the Pepperhill Mob) thought this was helping the "enemies".

Cheetham Hill Gang member Anthony "White Tony" Johnson was gunned down outside a local pub in 1991 (aged 22). Desmond Noonan was charged with Johnson's murder but was later acquitted. Over the next several years, he faced a number of convictions in connection with witness intimidation and jury tampering. The gun battle started when Johnson and Tony McKie were ambushed in the car park of the Penny Black pub. Their escape was blocked by a taxi with a man using a wheelchair inside. The wheelchair man, Paul Flannery, shot Tony McKie. McKie then began to run to a nearby house. But then brothers Desmond, Derek and Damian Noonan, and Michael Sharple, joined in the attack. Johnson was hit in the back as he tried to get away. Someone shouted 'Finish him off,' and two shots were fired. He was shot in the neck and through the mouth.

The gang was at its peak between the late 1980s and early 2000s. Empty social housing units were taken over by the gang and used to sell drugs, including a 14‑storey tower block on the border with Broughton, Salford.

Aside from turf wars, the Cheetham Hill Gang was also deeply involved in drug conspiracy. Many of the gang's members have been jailed for their role in selling heroin and other drugs. Their notoriety led to an investigation into the gang and its members.

== The Moss Side-Cheetham Hill War ==
In the 1980s and 1990s, the Cheetham Hill Gang was involved in a turf war with Moss Side gangs, particularly the Pepperhill Mob and later Doddington Gang. Members of the Cheetham Hill Gang were known for throwing celebration parties following the murder of rival Moss Side gang members.

Tensions originally arose after a robbery on the territory of one gang, but eventually escalated over a woman. The gang war between Moss Side and Cheetham Hill started with a prolific robber of mixed race, then in his mid twenties, known to the police as "the Gladiator" for his height and his fearless nature. The Gladiator had had a criminal record since his youth, and in the early eighties served a prison term, during which his girlfriend left him for one of the high–ranking members of the Moss Side gang. Speaking anonymously, one gang member speculated that the Gladiator "felt this was an affront to his manhood, but at the same time it was seen to be uncool to fight over a woman. So he did not immediately do anything about it when he came out of jail, but there was this simmering tension."

When a family with friends in both communities held a Christening party at a house on the Alexandra Park Estate in Moss Side, "The Gladiator" saw his chance. One version of events stated that he was standing in a doorway when a Moss Side man bumped into him and spilled his drink. Refusing the Moss Side member's apology, "The Gladiator" seized the opportunity to make a statement to Moss Side. He dragged the man outside and beat him badly. "Everyone came out the party and two sides are drawn," said a gang member later. "The Moss Side man who had been seeing his girlfriend comes out also, they have words and another fight kicks off. Then they fuck off back to Cheetham Hill and come back with guns." There was no shooting that day, but lines were drawn.

== Splinter cells ==
Members are known to split into separate splinter cells while remaining Cheetham Hill Gang members. In the 1990s, some of these splinter cells were the Y.F.C (Young Firm Crew), N.H.C (Niggaz, Honks, Chinks) in reference to the ethnicity of its members, and H.B.B (Hillbilly Bitches) an all-female splinter cell. Younger members are referred to as Y.C.H.Gs (Young Cheetham Hill Gang) or L.H.Gs (Little Hill Gang) until they are considered old enough or proven enough to drop the "Young" or "Little" from their title. Gang members can often be identified by their tattoos, with many having the letters C.H.G. somewhere on their upper body. They are also known for wearing large gold chains and bracelets as evidence of their wealth.

== See also ==
- British firms (organised crime)
- Gangs in the United Kingdom
- Gun crime in south Manchester
- Gunchester
- Madchester

== Sources ==
- Walsh, Peter (2005). Gang War: The Inside Story of the Manchester Gangs, Milo Books. ISBN 1903854296
- https://www.manchestereveningnews.co.uk/news/greater-manchester-news/jailed-half-century-cheetham-hill-8929661
- https://www.telegraph.co.uk/news/uknews/1490493/In-Smackhead-Alley-half-a-dozen-hooded-youths-melt-away.-CID-a-voice-challenges-from-the-shadows.html
