= CCTV Cities =

- Genre: Police
- Presented by: Donal MacIntyre
- Country of origin: United Kingdom
- Original language: English

Production
- Running time: 60 minutes
- Production company: Steadfast

Original release
- Network: Channel 5
- Release: 2008

CCTV Cities is a 2008 British television documentary programme, produced and presented by journalist Donal MacIntyre. Each episode featured a British town or city. Leeds (Halton Moor and Leeds city centre), Wigan, Edinburgh and London were all featured. The documentary was shown on Five.

Instances shown include an attempted suicide on a bridge in Leeds, where a man attempts to commit suicide by jumping into the River Aire, as well as police being attacked with missiles in Halton Moor, Leeds, when criminals attempted to regain a stolen car which the police were recovering.
