= Desmond Noonan =

English criminal

- Born: 1 August 1959; Whalley Range, Manchester, Lancashire, England
- Died: 19 March 2005 (aged 45); Chorlton, Manchester, England
- Occupations: Businessman; gangster
- Spouse: Sandra

Desmond Patrick Noonan (8 August 1959 – 19 March 2005) was an English organised crime figure from Manchester, who acted as an enforcer for the Noonan crime family. He and his younger brother, Dominic Noonan, were suspected by police of being responsible for at least 25 murders during their 20-year reign over Manchester's underworld.

== Early life ==
Born in Whalley Range, Manchester into an Irish family, Noonan emerged from poverty and into the criminal scene with his brothers Damian and Dominic Noonan. His criminal career began as a doorman in the early 1980s; his reputation as a fighter and his overall appearance gave him credibility on the club doors of Manchester.

Noonan then started to put his own men on the doors. By the late 1980s, 80% of the Manchester nightlife security was said to be controlled by the Noonan family. Around this time, Dominic Noonan was jailed for 15 years for his part in an armed robbery at a bank in Cheetham Hill, Manchester. During his imprisonment, still in control of the crime family, Damian and Desmond Noonan were forging links with other notable Manchester gangs including the Cheetham Hill and Salford gangs.

The Noonan family tended to have nothing to do with the Moss Side gangs, although Desmond Noonan was part of a group who provided gangs with guns and other weapons. After involving himself in Manchester's nightlife, Noonan started to become involved with other criminal and political circles outside Manchester. He went to forge links with gangs in London, Newcastle and Liverpool. It is alleged that Desmond Noonan also associated with many powerful criminal figures based in Leamington, Coventry and Birmingham. The association was based on the movement of guns and drugs between the West Midlands and the North West. Although the relationship was profitable it soon turned sour, leading to a war that saw a number of murders take place in Manchester and Birmingham, ultimately ending with the slaying of Ashley Foley and Josh King, both found shot in the face (to prevent an open-casket funeral). Desmond Noonan was held by West Midlands Police, but the case was dropped due to lack of evidence.

== Rise of the Noonans ==
Control of organised crime in the city fell to Desmond Noonan and his brothers following the 1991 gangland murder of rival leader of the Cheetham Hill Gang, Anthony "White Tony" Johnson. Noonan was charged with Johnson's murder but later acquitted. Over the next several years, he faced a number of convictions in connection to witness intimidation and jury tampering resulting in key witnesses refusing to testify against him and other members of the Noonan family.

By the mid-1990s Desmond Noonan was known as an enforcer, a very dangerous and violent man who had links with a wide swathe of Britain's underworld. In 1995, Noonan was convicted of violently attacking twin brothers, during which he was reportedly described by the court as psychotic, and sentenced to 33 months imprisonment.

By the end of the 1990s the Noonan family had been linked to 25 gangland murders and dozens of robberies and had a stranglehold on most of the nightclub security in many of England's major cities; they had also made over £8 million from bank robberies and security alone.

Noonan also began to venture into the nightlife of many other cities to gain more wealth, and power. He and his brothers Damian and Derek started to acquire business interests in nightclubs in Liverpool, London and Newcastle. Desmond Noonan tried to do deals in other cities with their gangland figures, and was soon becoming involved with a number of crime bosses such as the Liverpool drugs baron Curtis Warren and head of Newcastle's biggest crime family Paddy Conroy.

The strength and power of the family, in particular Desmond Noonan, allowed him to be a prime peacemaker in the Manchester gang truces which for a short period of time brought the war in Moss Side to an end. Other gangland figures participating in this truce were Paul Massey, Damian Noonan, Paul Flannery and apparently Jimmy "the Weed" Donnelly, who was a prominent figure in the Quality Street Gang, another Manchester gang.

Noonan was released from prison in 2002 and became head of the Noonan crime family after Damian's death in 2003. Damian Noonan had died in a motorbike accident while on holiday in the Dominican Republic.

== Politics ==
Desmond Noonan was a lifelong Irish Republican and anti-fascist. He was active with the anti-National Front "Squads" of the early 1980s and then with Anti-Fascist Action, which was formed in 1985. In 1993, Noonan was present at a meeting in the Seymour pub, Whalley Range, between AFA and an individual who had recently set up a South Manchester British National Party branch. Noonan told the individual: "There's one thing that not many people know about me ... and that's the fact that I'm anti-fascist to the core. Now tell these lads what they want to know, because I don't want to come back here and see you again." He was involved with AFA right through the 1990s. His last-known anti-fascist work was "canvassing" the BNP when they stood in Newton Heath in 2002.

== Death ==
Desmond Noonan was last seen on the night of 18 March 2005 drinking in the Park pub in Northern Moor, Wythenshawe, at around 11:30 pm. Early on Saturday morning, Sandra Noonan received a phone call from her husband telling her that he had been stabbed. He asked her to pick him up in the suburb of Chorlton. By the time she arrived, Noonan was lying unconscious in Merseybank Avenue. She called for an ambulance, but Noonan died of his wounds before arriving at Manchester Royal Infirmary.

His funeral was held in south Manchester on 22 April 2005. It was reportedly attended by hundreds of local residents with a kilted pipe band playing as his coffin arrived in a horse-drawn hearse at St Aidan's R.C. Church, Northern Moor.

Derek McDuffus, a drug dealer from south Manchester, was charged on 15 June after appearing at Preston Crown Court, and was eventually convicted of Noonan's murder, for which he received a life sentence. He was subsequently placed in solitary confinement to protect him from retribution by the Noonan family. Desmond Noonan, who was suspected of having developed a drug addiction towards the end of his life, was thought by the authorities to have been coercing local drug dealers into supplying him with narcotics, and had left the pub intoxicated in search of a drug dealer. It is believed McDuffus stabbed Noonan and threw him out of his residence, after which he bled to death in the street.

Noonan died four days before the broadcast of journalist Donal MacIntyre's fly on the Wall documentary MacIntyre's Underworld.

== See also ==
- Gangs in the United Kingdom
