= Gooch Close Gang =

Organised crime group in Manchester, England

- Founded: Late 1980s
- Founding location: Alexandra Park estate, Moss Side, Manchester
- Years active: 1980s to present
- Territory: Moss Side, Whalley Range, Fallowfield, Old Trafford, Chorlton and Hulme in South Manchester
- Ethnicity: Primarily Afro-Caribbean, multi-ethnic Black British
- Membership (est.): 250+
- Criminal activities: Drug trafficking, weapon trafficking, robbery, kidnapping, prostitution, extortion, racketeering, murder, money laundering
- Allies: Young Gooch, Mossway, Original Stanley Grove, Pit Bull Crew, Fallowfield Man Dem, Fallowfield Mad Dogs, Old Trafford Crips, Rusholme Crew Gangsters, Rusholme Crips, M21, RangeBlocc, Noonan Crime Family, Cheetham Hill Gang, Shower Posse, British Crime Firms
- Rivals: Doddington Gang, Moss Side Bloods, Longsight Crew, Haydock Close Crew, Portuguese Mafia, AO, Pepperhill Mob

The Gooch Close Gang, also known as the G.C.O.G's (Gooch Close Original Gangsters) or simply "The Gooch" in Manchester, was an organised crime group based in Moss Side and surrounding neighbourhoods of South Manchester, England. Most members of the gang grew up on the westside of the Alexandra Park estate in Moss Side around Gooch Close (which is where the gang gets its name).

The Gooch gang had violent disputes with many other South Manchester gangs, most notably The Doddington Gang (formerly known as the Pepperhill Mob), the Moss Side Bloods, the Haydock Close Crew and the Longsight Crew.

== History ==
The Gooch Gang had its origins in the west side of the Alexandra Park estate in Moss Side. Young men would hang around a shebeen on Gooch Close selling drugs which is where the gang started and how they got their name. Gooch Close was a small cul-de-sac of semi-detached houses with an alley at one end. In the mid-1990s, the Alexandra Park estate was redeveloped; the street was redesigned and had its name changed to Westerling Way.

The gangs—whilst supplying to the street dealers—also tried to ensure that the dealers were protected from other gangs by protecting their territory. Most of their problems occurred when rival street dealers started to move into territory already controlled by a gang or when a gang 'taxed' a rival dealer—a move seen as damaging street credibility and respect.

The gangs in South Manchester, including the Gooch Gang, were made up of mostly first and second generation British West Indies Caribbean heritage members, whose grandparents came to England from the 1950s as part of the Windrush generation.

Around the same time as the Gooch Close gang was becoming known around the city, the Pepperhill Gang were also starting to emerge—taking their name from a pub on the east side of the Alexandra Park estate. When the pub was closed down and the gang targeted by police, they reformed around nearby Doddington Close and would go on to become known as the Doddington Gang.

In the late 1980s and early 1990s, the Pepperhill Gang were involved in a gang war between Moss Side and the Cheetham Hill Gang from North Manchester. The Gooch often bought and sold drugs with the Cheetham Hill Gang. The Gooch had close ties to Cheetham Hill, with the cousin of the head of the Cheetham Hill being a leading figure in the Gooch. The Pepperhill Gang thought this was helping the "enemy". The Pepperhill Gang declared that nobody from South Manchester was to have dealings with Cheetham Hill. This angered the Gooch and a fierce war erupted, dividing the Alexandra Park estate in half, with the Gooch on the west side, and the Pepperhill on the east side. Although the gang war was centred around Moss Side, young males from neighbouring areas would be drawn into the conflict resulting in a number of deaths and regular shooting incidents in South Manchester throughout the 1990s and 2000s.^{[7]}

In 1996, an offshoot gang was identified (Young Gooch), which gained a frightening reputation for the violence and guns its members used. Five of its members were later arrested following Operation Eagle and were sentenced to more than 43 years in prison. The Young Gooch started to war with the newly emerging Longsight Crew, a younger offshoot of the Doddington Gang whose members were based on a number of estates in the Longsight and Ardwick areas of South Manchester, especially their headquarters of Langport Avenue.

By the mid-2000s, the Gooch had grown to become a vast gang made up of a number of smaller offshoot crews based around South Manchester. The most notable of these being the Longsight Street Soldiers, Old Trafford Crips, Rusholme Crips and Fallowfield Mad Dogs. These gangs would carry on the rivalry with Doddington and Longsight Crew into the 2000s.

== Alliances and Offshoot Gangs ==
The Gooch Gang has grown into a network of individual gang factions. These factions are loosely connected, having their own leader(s) and at times operating independently from one another.

Younger Gooch Close Gang (YGC)

The YGC was a gang for newer and younger gang members established in 1996, led by the likes of Colin "Piggy" Joyce and Lee "Cabbo" Amos.

Pit Bull Crew (PBC)

The Pit Bull Crew, led by Thomas "Tommy" Pitt was created in the memory of Raymond "Pitbull" Pitt (Tommy Pitt's brother). Raymond Pitt was a Doddington leader who was killed by his own gang in 1995 due to an internal power struggle.

The PBC waged war on the Longsight Crew and the Doddington, who they held responsible for Raymond's death. They originally fought with the Gooch as well, but quickly established a truce and alliance with the Gooch. Going on to be one of the most feared gangs in the Gooch umbrella after a string of murders.

Longsight Street Soldiers (LSSS)

The LSSS (L triple S) were originally a faction of the Longsight Crew, but they became disillusioned after a dispute escalated to tit-for-tat shootings.

Subsequently, the LSSS allied themselves with the Gooch/PBC side and began a violent dispute with the Longsight Crew and the Doddington Gang. Two senior members—Ricardo Williams and Narada "Yardie" Williams—were jailed for the high-profile murder of Tyrone Gilbert.

Rusholme Crew Gangsters (RCG)

The Rusholme Crew Gangsters (formerly known as the Rusholme Mandem or RMD) was formed in response to Doddington hostilities.

RCG members claimed affiliation with the Gooch through friendship and family ties and would become active in the South Manchester gang wars.

Today, the RCG acronym stands for the Rusholme Crip Gang. In recent years RCG has been engaged in deadly tit-for-tat wars with other South Manchester gangs.

Fallowfield Mandem (FMD)

The FMD were once considered more of a neighbourhood nuisance, rather than a gang. However, that began to change after a popular member, Marcus Fullerton, was shot dead on an avenue in Fallowfield.

The other FMD members were subsequently drawn into gang culture, allying themselves with the Gooch and inheriting their war with Doddington and Longsight.

A younger faction of FMD called themselves the Fallowfield Mad Dogs (keeping the FMD acronym) and carried on the war with Doddington affiliated gangs, especially the younger faction of the LSC known as L-Town. Its members were notable for their use of diss tracks on YouTube taunting their enemies, whom were derided as the 'bwoidem,' patois for those boys.

Old Trafford Cripz (OTC)

The OTC began as a younger version of the YGC but quickly established themselves as a separate faction, indeed for a period in the mid-2000s the OTC were the most active soldiers on the Gooch side. Trading shots with the younger Doddington clique known as the Moss Side Bloods, as well as the LSC and the newer Haydock Close Crew based in Stretford.

OTC members revived the weaning practice of allying themselves with the Los Angeles gang the Crips, wearing blue and referring to themselves as "Locs."

C Block/M21

C block is a gang from the Manchester suburb of Chorlton-cum-Hardy, especially the Nell Lane estate and the Merseybank estate.

Similarly to the FMD, this gang, originally regarded as troublemakers, were drawn into gang culture after a prominent member was killed. Miguel Reynolds (see below) posthumously became a talismanic figure and inspiration for the gang, which also claims affiliation to Gooch and Crips through family ties and friendships.

C Block associates have been known to promote themselves on YouTube through UK rap and UK drill, its most prominent artist being Tunde.

== Gooch Close Gang vs. Doddington Original Gangsters gang war ==
While not an exhaustive list of violent altercations and murders, this section details the most notable incidents of the "Gunchester" Era, including many deaths as a direct result of the gang war between the Gooch Close Gang and their allies vs. the Doddington Gang (previously known as the Pepperhill Gang) and the Longsight Crew.

=== Murder of Carl "Beefy" Stapleton ===
On 29 April 1991, 17-year-old Carl Stapleton was attacked with a machete on the Alexandra Park estate in Moss Side. Stapleton, who was friendly with members of the Gooch Close gang, died from fifteen stab wounds to his heart and lungs. Four men were charged with his murder, but the trial collapsed after a key witness refused to testify due to intimidation. No one was ever convicted, and Stapleton's killing marked a bloody escalation in the Gooch–Doddington gang feud.

=== Murder of Darren "Dabs" Samuels ===
Later in 1991, 21-year-old Darren Samuels, on bail for attempted murder, was shot dead in Moss Side amid the same gang war. Two suspects stood trial for Samuels' murder, but in December 1991 the case was abandoned when the 18-year-old eyewitness—Samuels' companion—attempted suicide and refused to give evidence out of fear. The defendants were cleared and Samuels' murder remains unsolved.

=== Rising violence and Operation China ===
By 1992, South Manchester's gang violence had reached crisis levels, earning the city the grim nickname "Gunchester" in the press. Gunfire became almost routine: two shooting incidents a day were recorded in Moss Side alone. The turf war between the Gooch Close Gang and the Pepperhill Gang drove many innocent residents to leave the Alexandra Park estate. In response, Greater Manchester Police launched Operation China—an undercover crackdown that netted 23 leading gang members in August 1991 and saw them jailed by 1992 on drug and weapons charges. Operation China temporarily disrupted the gangs, even causing the Pepperhill to regroup around Dodington Close on the east side of the estate, the gang was then renamed as the Doddington Original Gangsters. Violence continued as younger gangsters moved in to fill the void nevertheless, the arrests pressured older gang leaders to contemplate a ceasefire: by late 1992–93 some rival "Gooch" and "Doddington" figures even met to play football together amid talk of a truce.

=== Murder of John "Benji" Stanley ===
On 11 January 1993, 14-year-old Benji Stanley was shot dead with a shotgun while waiting for food at a takeaway in Moss Side. The gunman fired through the shop window at point-blank range, hitting Stanley in the head and chest. His murder shocked the nation and the media dubbed Manchester "Gunchester" as Stanley's death became a symbol of innocent lives lost to gang crossfire. Hundreds marched in Moss Side demanding action. Police insisted Benji was killed by Gooch men who mistook him for a Doddington member, though evidence later suggested he might have been used as a drug courier. No one was ever charged for Stanley's killing, but the outcry it generated led to intensified police-community initiatives against gun crime.

=== Threat to Paddy Ashdown ===
In September 1993, then-Liberal Democrat leader Paddy Ashdown visited Moss Side amid the furor over youth violence. During his tour of the run-down shopping precinct, Ashdown was confronted by a suspected teenage Gooch member brandishing a submachine gun. The youth brandished his gun and ordered the countries third most senior politician to leave. This brazen threat to a national party leader, dramatically illustrated the lawlessness in Moss Side at that time. Ashdown and his entourage withdrew unharmed, but the incident spurred government attention on Manchester's gangs and prompted vows by police to regain control of the area.

=== Murder of Julian "Turbo" Stewart ===
On 1 January 1994, Julian Stewart, 21, a prominent member of the Doddington Gang, was shot in the head and killed on the streets of Moss Side. Stewart had been arrested in 1991 in connection with Carl Stapleton's murder and was a well-known gang figure. His assassination—carried out by a rival gunman, reportedly from the Gooch Gang—came almost exactly one year after Benji Stanley's death. Unlike Stanley, Stewart's killing received little media attention (viewed as "just another drug dealer got killed"). It did, however, eliminate a key Doddington enforcer and further inflamed the cycle of daily tit-for-tat shootings.

=== Shooting of Doddington/Pepperhill leader ===
In mid-1994, Ian McLeod—the Doddington leader after Delroy Brown decamped back to Birmingham—narrowly survived an assassination attempt. One afternoon, as McLeod drove through rush-hour traffic in Moss Side, a car pulled alongside and a gunman opened fire with a high-caliber weapon. McLeod was shot in his head and crashed into a tree, stumbling out bloodied before collapsing. Bystanders were caught in the chaos—a stray bullet struck a woman 150 yards away in the leg. Police suspected the ambushers were young affiliates of the Cheetham Hill gang and the Gooch.

=== Gooch–Doddington truce ===
In late 1994, weary from years of bloodshed, fresh out of prison, and inspired by Watts truce, the older gang leaders attempted a truce. Veterans of the Gooch and Doddington gangs—many recently released after Operation China—met and agreed to cease hostilities. Remarkably, rival gang members even played football matches together as a symbol of peace. Community leaders cautiously welcomed the lull, though they doubted it would last. Indeed, while drive-by shootings dipped in 1995, tensions remained.

=== Murder of Orville "Bigga" Bell ===
On 29 October 1996, Orville Bell, 17, was murdered in a drive-by shooting in Longsight. Bell—nicknamed "Bigga" and known to drive a sporty red Honda— was sitting in his car with a friend when two masked youths on bicycles crept up. One tapped on Bell's window with a handgun; as Bell cracked the window, the assailant shoved the gun in and shot him twice, hitting Bell's jaw and throat. Mortally wounded, Bell put his car in reverse, dragging one attacker's bike, and stumbled out before collapsing. The gunmen stole the gold chain from around Bell's neck as he lay bleeding. He died in the hospital days later.

Police theorised Bell was killed by a younger Gooch faction who had turned their attention to Doddington-affiliated Longsight gangs while the truce with Doddington was active. Bell's brutal killing led to the rise of the Longsight crew determined to avenge his killing. The following day the young Longsight Crew carried out a drive-by shooting on Gooch Close.

=== Murder of Evon Berry ===
In the early hours of New Year's Day 1996, Evon Berry, 37, was shot dead while heroically intervening in a gang robbery in Bristol. Berry—a respected community worker in St. Paul's, Bristol—came upon three Gooch gang members pistol-whipping a man during a street robbery. He pleaded, "It's New Year's, calm down," but one attacker (later identified as Errol "EJ" Jones of Manchester) coldly pressed a gun to Berry's neck and shot him. The gang then shot another bystander and fled. Berry staggered to a taxi office and collapsed dead.

Over 1,000 people attended "Bangy" Berry's funeral, hailing him as a peacemaker. Within a month, GMP arrested Errol Jones back in Manchester, and he was later convicted of Berry's murder. A Bristol judge called Berry's murder "one of the most dreadful crimes" in the city's history.

=== Killing of Zeus King ===
On 7 March 1997, Zeus King, 19, was accidentally shot and killed by his own gang during a late-night shoot-out with Longsight crew members. King—son of 1970s soul singer Marcel King—was part of the Young Gooch Close crew that crept into Longsight crew territory with rapid-fire guns. When Gooch members opened up on their rivals, one of the bullets struck Zeus King instead, killing him instantly. He died with a loaded handgun still in his pocket.

King's death went unpunished, though it spurred even fiercer hatred between Gooch and the Longsight Crew.

=== Murder of Kevin Lewis ===
On 1 April 1997, Kevin Lewis, 27, a top Doddington Gang member, was shot dead outside the Shamrock pub in Moss Side. Lewis—a veteran of the early 90s "Alexandra Park wars"—had survived multiple attempts on his life and was known as a Doddington enforcer. That night, masked youths on bicycles ambushed Lewis as he parked his BMW. A gunman rode up and fired a burst of 10–12 shots from a MAC-10 machine pistol, hitting Lewis in the head. He died instantly, and a 30-year-old woman was wounded by a stray bullet. Despite 36 officers and 100+ interviews, Lewis' killers were never caught. His funeral turned violent: when a pub-goer allegedly disrespected Lewis' memory, two of his friends (armed with pool cues) trashed the bar shouting, "Gooch men are coming—and we're Doddington!" This "disgraceful exhibition" landed them in jail and underscored how Lewis' murder threatened to explode into further gang reprisals. This murder signalled the end of the Gooch-Doddington truce.

=== Shooting of Davinia Smith ===
In January 1998, Davinia Smith, a 16-year-old innocent bystander, was critically wounded in a gang-related shooting that underscored the extreme recklessness of the ongoing feud. Smith was out celebrating her birthday in Longsight when she and two friends accepted a taxi ride with some Longsight Crew members they met at a club. Unbeknownst to the girls, those young men were Gooch targets. As the shared taxi traveled through Longsight in the early hours, a car pulled alongside and a masked gunman sprayed the cab with bullets. The taxi's windows shattered under a hail of gunfire. Smith was shot in the head, one bullet piercing her brain. Acting fast, the cab driver raced straight to Manchester Royal Infirmary, where surgeons performed emergency brain surgery. Miraculously, Smith survived after part of her brain was removed—though she suffered life-changing injuries.

Police confirmed the schoolgirl had no gang involvement and was likely mistaken for (or simply caught with) the intended targets.

=== Murder of Anthony Cook ===
On 15 August 1999, Anthony Cook, 24, was executed in his car— the third gang murder in 16 days after Martin "Remy" Bennett and Dorrie "Junior" Mckie were shot dead. Cook, a known Doddington "rising star," was sitting in a VW Golf in Chorlton when a gunman approached the passenger side and shot him seven times in the head and chest at point-blank range. A friend in the driver's seat was shot three times in the abdomen but survived by fleeing to get help. Police described Cook's slaying as a professional hit, possibly over a personal dispute (one theory was a row over a girl). Soon after, a Gooch gangster allegedly taunted a Doddington boss by phone: "We killed your boy [Cook]." The Doddington leader's chilling reply: "You just saved us a bullet—we were after him ourselves.".

Cook's death prompted prominent community figures like Rev. Phil Sumner to beg gangs at Bennett's and Cook's funerals to "stop the cycle" before more young lives were lost.

=== Murder of Judah Dewar ===
In October 1999, an innocent man became collateral damage: Judah Dewar, 35, was shot dead in Longsight simply for being "in the wrong place, at the wrong time, in the wrong car." Dewar, a father of nine with no gang ties, had just visited a friend and gotten into his BMW coupe when a teenager shot him in the chest. Dewar collapsed next to his car and died within seconds. Police believe the 15-year-old shooter mistook Dewar for a Longsight Crew member because of his fancy car. Chief suspect, Thomas "Little T" Ramsey (15) of the Gooch affiliated Pit Bull Crew faction, was charged, but the case was thrown out for insufficient evidence. (Ramsey himself was killed a year later in a suspected internal gang purge.)

=== Murder of Roger Ormsby ===
On 5 January 2000, the charred body of Roger Ormsby, 34, was found in his burning BMW in Whalley Range. Ormsby had been shot three times in the back of the head—an execution-style killing—and the car set aflame. Ormsby was a local businessman with an expensive lifestyle (multiple properties and a garage) but no obvious legitimate income. Police quietly suspected he financed gang activities or the drug trade, and indeed the Gooch Gang were suspected of ordering his murder.

=== Murders of Clifton Bryan and Denis Wilson ===
On 5 May 2000, a gruesome discovery was made in Leeds: the bodies of Clifton Bryan, 29, and Denis Wilson, 32, were found bundled in a car, both shot in the head. Bryan—a muscular Manchester gangster who had relocated to Leeds to expand drug operations—and Wilson—a Doddington member (and half-brother of slain 1997 gang leader Kevin Lewis)—had been lured to a house in Manchester, then executed and dumped 40 miles away in Harehills, Leeds. Police later determined this was a Gooch Gang hit: several Gooch members were arrested and charged, including one who confessed before retracting his admission. However, after two trials by 2003, all suspects were acquitted due to lack of solid evidence.

=== Murder of Marcus Greenidge ===
On 14 September 2000, Marcus Greenidge, 21, a member of the Longsight Crew, was shot dead in an attack amid a flare-up with the Gooch and Pit Bulls. As Greenidge was walking on Langport Avenue (the Longsight Crew's turf) a Pitt Bull gunman stormed the block. He cornered Greenidge and opened fire at close range, shooting him in the head. He died instantly, a loaded Tokarev pistol still tucked in his pocket—showing he was armed but had no chance to react. After the murder, PBC leader Tommy Pitt bragged, "I've just whacked a Longsight boy, that Marcus!" Greenidge's slaying was one of several committed by Pitt's Gooch-affiliated "Pit Bull Crew" in 2000 as they sought to dominate Longsight, Gorton and Levenshulme. Pitt and many of his lieutenants were later indicted for multiple murders, including Greenidge's.

=== Murder of Dean Eccleston ===
On 12 October 2001, Dean Eccleston, 24, was shot dead on Shakespeare Walk in Chorlton-on-Medlock. The murder came amid a renewed surge of shootings that summer—police logged nine gangland killings by this point in the year. Eccleston was walking near his home when a gunman emerged from the shadows and opened fire. He was hit multiple times and died at the scene.

While Eccleston was not a major gang player, he was both feared and affiliated with the LSC. Thus police suspect his murder was carried out by a Gooch gang "soldier" as part of the Moss Side vs. Longsight feud. His mother, Sheila Eccleston, tearfully told reporters that "everyone knows who killed my son," but fear kept witnesses silent. No arrests were made.

=== Murder of Aeon Shirley ===
On 10 April 2002, a wild gun battle erupted on Langport Avenue in Longsight, leaving 18-year-old Aeon Shirley dead. Following the murder of a Gooch associate, members of the Gooch gang had mounted a retaliatory raid into Longsight territory and Doddington/Longsight Crew gunmen lay in wait.

A sustained firefight broke out in the residential close—dozens of shots were exchanged. Shirley, an alleged Longsight Crew member, was struck by four bullets and collapsed in the street. He died at the scene, becoming the 27th gangland murder in the Moss Side–Longsight–Hulme triangle since mid-1999.

Shirley's death galvanized community anti-gun movements like "Mothers Against Violence" and "Gangstop," which organized marches of hundreds through South Manchester demanding an end to the bloodshed.

=== Murder of Stephen "Tecka" Amos ===
On 12 February 2002, Stephen Amos, 21, was shot dead outside the Bexx Bar nightclub in Ashton-under-Lyne. Amos—younger brother of Gooch member Lee Amos—had been enjoying a night out when a Longsight Crew enforcer ambushed him with a handgun in the street. He was hit in the head at close range and died shortly after. Amos's murder was one of two gang killings that February (the other being Chinadu Iheagwara in a separate dispute). Police suspected it was revenge by the Longsight Crew for recent Gooch and LSSS aggressions. In the aftermath, Longsight's leader Julian Bell (recently released from prison) was arrested; he was found carrying £38,000 cash and later charged with gun offences (though not convicted of Amos's murder).

In 2009, Lee Amos and Colin Joyce of Gooch would be convicted for orchestrating multiple murders, but Stephen Amos' case remained technically separate (his suspected shooter was a Longsight affiliate who was himself later shot dead in 2013). The incident fuelled a major GMP crackdown: by 2005, the dedicated XCalibre Task Force was formed to combat gun gangs.

=== Murders of Marcus Fullerton and Justin Maynard ===
In 2003, 22-year-old Marcus Fullerton (believed to be a Fallowfield Mandem gang member and a Gooch associate) was shot and killed in South Manchester. Fullerton's death, while not widely reported at the time, occurred amid a resurgence of gang hostilities that year. Fullerton would become a talismanic figure for the younger faction of the Fallowfield Mandem, who would go on to become deeply involved in the Gooch-Doddington war.

On 26 August 2003, Justin Maynard, 19, was fatally shot on Tugford Close in Moss Side. Maynard was hanging out near the Alexandra Park estate when a gunman opened fire, hitting him in the head. He died at the scene. Justin Maynard's killing prompted a significant police response—GMP stepped up armed patrols in Moss Side that summer, fearing a flare-up of the Gooch–Longsight feud. Although not a gang member, Maynard had ties to the Doddington gang and it is believed his death was part of internecine disputes among younger Gooch and younger Doddington affiliates. His case remains unsolved. Together, the murders of Fullerton and Maynard in 2003 signaled that Manchester's gang wars were not yet over, despite the successful prosecutions of some leaders.

=== Murders of Elliot Proudfoot and Ramone Cumberbatch ===
Later in 2004, two more young men—Elliot Proudfoot (18) and Ramone Cumberbatch (20)—were gunned down in separate incidents linked to the gang feud. Proudfoot, whose brother Alphonso Madden had been shot to death three years earlier, was believed to have associations with Gooch. He was fatally shot in Fallowfield, by a smiling assassin who asked "do you remember me?"

In Hulme over the summer, Cumberbatch—a Doddington associate trying to move away from gang life—was spotted in Hulme by Errol "Little EJ" Reynolds. Reynolds pulled a handgun from his waistband and waved it at Ramone and hit him over the head with it. Moments later, two shots were fired at Ramone who was fatally hit in the chest. These back-and-forth killings kept 2004 as violent as the preceding year—by now more than 26 gangland executions had occurred in three years, a considerably higher death toll than any other gang war in the United Kingdom.

=== Gooch vs. Longsight Crew hospital clash ===
In April 2004, the rivalry spilled into an unprecedented location—Manchester Royal Infirmary. After a double shooting in Moss Side, wounded members of the Gooch and Longsight Crew encountered each other in the hospital's A&E department, sparking chaos. Spotting a rival in the waiting area, a Gooch gangster alerted his crew and Longsight reinforcements were summoned by phone. Within minutes, around twenty armed gang members converged. They chased each other through corridors and wards, brandishing handguns and even a hammer. Patients and doctors screamed and fled "for their lives," and the hospital went into lockdown.

The gangsters smuggled out their firearms as police rushed in, so no firearm charges could be brought. However, ten gang members (eight Gooch, two Longsight) were arrested and later jailed for affray and public order offences, and a judge castigated them for causing "mayhem and panic" in a place of healing. This notorious "hospital clash" demonstrated the gangs' brazenness by that point—no place, not even a hospital, was off-limits. It also directly led to multi-agency calls for tougher gang injunctions and ASBOs to bar known members from certain areas or activities (for instance, courts began prohibiting gang members from wearing gang colours or riding bikes in public, since bikes were used in many shootings).

=== Mistaken release of Bobby Phipps ===
In 2005, Greater Manchester Police endured an embarrassing blunder when Robert "Bobby" Phipps, the leader of the Longsight Street Soldiers or LSSS, and ally of the Gooch Close gang, was mistakenly released from HM Prison Manchester.

Phipps had been serving time for firearms offenses linked to gang activity. Due to a clerical mix-up in the prison system, he was discharged early without completing his sentence. The error was only discovered after Phipps had absconded. The incident sparked outrage in the community, given the risk of a hardened gang member returning to the streets prematurely. GMP launched a manhunt and fortunately re-arrested Phipps within weeks, but not before he got involved in a gang shoot-out while on the run.

=== Murder of Jessie James ===
In the early hours of 9 September 2006, Jessie James, 15, was shot dead while riding his bicycle through Broadfield Park in Moss Side. The popular teenager was hit three times—once in the head—by a gunman hiding in the bushes, and died at the scene. Jessie had no gang record, and it is widely believed his murder was a tragic mistaken identity case. It is likely that the Old Trafford Cripz, a younger gang from Old Trafford affiliated with Gooch, took him for a member of the Moss Side Bloods, which were a Doddington splinter group. A 16-year-old girl, mistaken for a Gooch Gang associate was shot in response.

Police launched an operation to catch his killer, but faced an absolute wall of silence. Despite numerous pleas—and even a coroner publicly naming suspects during an inquest—no witnesses would formally come forward.

Jessie James's unsolved murder became symbolic of Manchester's gang scourge. Jessie's name is now tragically etched in Manchester's history alongside Benji Stanley's as innocent youths slain in the crossfire of gang culture.

=== Murders of Ucal Chin and Tyrone Gilbert ===
On 15 June 2007, Ucal Chin, 24, was shot dead in a drive-by attack on Anson Road in Longsight. Chin, known to be associated with the Longsight Crew, was sitting in a car when gunmen in a passing vehicle opened fire, riddling the car with bullets—the fifth drive-by shooting that week. He sustained fatal wounds and died before help arrived. His murder was soon linked to the Gooch Gang—it occurred in the midst of a violent flare-up between Gooch and Longsight factions in the summer of 2007.

On 27 July 2007, Tyrone Gilbert, 23, was gunned down by members of the Gooch and Longsight Street Soldiers during a wake for Ucal Chin. Dozens of friends had gathered on Frobisher Close in Longsight for a vigil when, just after midnight, a car full of masked gunmen sped by and sprayed the crowd with bullets. Gilbert was struck multiple times and collapsed as others dove for cover. He was pronounced dead en route to hospital. Another man was injured. Gilbert, a close friend of Chin's and brother of Marcus Greenidge had been part of the Gooch-Longsight hospital battle.

These two murders (Chin and Gilbert) were pivotal: they were the last major acts of Gooch/LSSS vs. Longsight violence before a concerted law enforcement crackdown. In 2009, Gooch kingpins Colin Joyce and Lee Amos were found guilty of the Chin and Gilbert killings, among other crimes, and each received 35-year life terms. The brazen nature of Gilbert's slaying (firing on a funeral gathering) highlighted the gangs' total disregard for even basic norms of decency.

=== Murders of Halton McCollin and Louis Braithwaite ===
On 22 January 2008, Halton McCollin, 20, was shot in the head inside a Chinese takeaway in Stretford and died three days later. McCollin was waiting for food when a gunman burst in and fired indiscriminately; the attack was a case of mistaken identity—Halton was wrongly presumed to be a Haydock Close Crew member, a Doddington faction based in Stretford, by the shooter. In fact, he had no gang affiliation. His death outraged the public and led to renewed appeals for witnesses (with a £50,000 reward). Halton's killing highlighted the continued danger to innocents in gang-plagued areas and the long memories of such cases.

Louis "LB" Braithwaite, 16, was shot dead in Fallowfield in retaliation for the murder of Halton McColin, becoming another casualty of gang rivalry. Braithwaite was associated with the Fallowfield Mad Dogs (FMD), a younger Gooch-aligned crew. He was ambushed by members of a younger faction of the Longsight Crew near his home and killed by a shotgun blast. His death was part of a vicious feud between the FMD (who wore blue and were tied to Gooch) and the newer "L-Town" faction of the Longsight Crew, (who wore red). Braithwaite's nickname "LB" is still invoked in rap songs by Manchester rappers and he is remembered as a talismanic figure—one of the last teen victims of the "Gunchester" Era.

The suspects in his murder were known locally, but lack of evidence impeded prosecutions. Louis' death and the violent response by the Fallowfield Mad Dogs also galvanized GMP to obtain gang injunctions specifically targeting the Fallowfield Mad Dogs in late 2008—banning certain youths from associating publicly or entering rival districts. These civil orders were a novel tactic to dampen gang mobility.

=== Murder of Giuseppe "G-Sepz" Gregory ===
On 10 May 2009, Giuseppe Gregory, 16, was shot dead in a car outside the Robin Hood pub in Stretford. Gregory, associated with Doddington and Longsight's L-Town faction, was sitting in a VW Golf with friends (one of whom was acquitted of the Louis Braithwaite murder days before) when three gunmen approached and fired at the car, hitting Giuseppe in the neck. He died hours later in surgery.

This murder was carried out by younger Gooch factions; Moses "Mojo" Mathias of the Young Gooch Close Gang, Njabulo Ndlovu of the Old Trafford Cripz and Hiruy Zerihun of the Fallowfield Mad Dogs as a response to the killing of Louis Braithwaite. In fact, Giuseppe had also been injured years earlier by a suspected Gooch gunman.

Indeed, after the 2009 Gooch convictions, South Manchester gun crime dropped sharply. Giuseppe Gregory is thus often regarded as "the last victim of the gang war," and his death effectively marked the end of the 20-year "Gunchester" Era. Manchester's Chief Constable would later cite "the last fatal gang shooting was Giuseppe Gregory" as evidence of progress.

== Imprisonment of Gooch leaders ==
Ten members of South Manchester's Gooch Gang were put on trial in October 2008 for a catalogue of gang-related crimes. Gang members Colin Joyce and Lee Amos had been arrested in 2000, when they had been apprehended at their "nerve centre" in a house in Moss Side, found with an "extraordinary array of firearms." In 2001, they had been sentenced to nine years in prison but had been released early, on licence, in 2007 and there had followed a new bout of shootings.

In April 2009, Joyce and Amos were among 11 members of the Gooch Gang who were found guilty and charged with a "catalogue of crimes" which included the murder of Ucal Chin and Tyrone Gilbert. These convictions were hailed by Manchester's chief prosecutor John Holt as having "enormous significance for public safety." Their trials were held 35 miles away at Liverpool Crown Court to lower the risk of witness intimidation from other gang members. Not unusually, the perpetrators of gun crime were also the victims, with Amos' brother Stephen Baba-Tunde Amos having been shot dead, in a gang-related shooting, aged 21, outside a bar in Ashton-under-Lyne in 2002.

Colin Joyce, aged 29, known as the leader of the gang, was given a minimum 39-year sentence. Lee Amos was sentenced to receive at least 35 years, dying in prison in 2024. Three other members of the gang were given minimum sentences of between 30 and 35 years.

== Modern day ==
=== Murders of Gary Mullings, Ahmed Mohammed, Andre Marshall, Abdulwahab Hafidah and Miguel Reynolds ===
Gary Mullings

On 26 July 2011, Rusholme Crew leader Gary Mullings, 30, was killed with a knife during a botched armed robbery in Old Trafford. Mullings had been a longtime Manchester gang member—in fact, he was acquitted in 2002 of a gang murder (the 2001 shooting of Alan Byron in Longsight).

Andre Marshall

On 20 May 2015, Andre "Dre" Marshall, 29, was shot seven times and left to die in a park in Urmston. Marshall, a Manchester gang member (reportedly linked to the Young Gooch Close Gang), had been socializing with acquaintances in Manor Park when he was ambushed at close range. His body was found in a car park the next morning. At first, police got nowhere—no witnesses would speak, and suspects fled overseas.

Nearly a decade later in 2023, one of Andre's associates, Abdul Qadar Ahsan, was extradited from Pakistan and charged with his murder. Ahsan had been with Marshall the night of the killing and fled the UK days later. In October 2024, a Manchester jury found that Ahsan himself pulled the trigger, killing his friend over an unknown dispute. He was convicted of Marshall's murder and sentenced to life in prison (28-year minimum).

Ahmed Mohammed

Ahmed "Mudz" Mohammed, 20, was fatally stabbed on Crondall Street in Moss Side, Manchester, on 22 March 2016. His death marked a resurgence of gang-related violence in the area, following a period of relative calm. Police investigations linked his murder to an escalating feud between two Gooch and Doddington splinter gangs: AO/Moss Side Bloods and Mossway/Rusholme Crips. This incident was one of several violent episodes in the region during that period, including when a 22-year-old man was blasted in the chest on Salisbury Street.

Abdulwahab Hafidah

On 12 May 2016, Abdulwahab "Lansky" Hafidah, 18, was hunted down and brutally killed on a busy road in Moss Side. Hafidah, a college student of Libyan descent, was a known member of the Rusholme Crips (blue-affiliated gang). That afternoon, a rival crew from Moss Side known as "AO" (Active Only) spotted Hafidah near their territory. What followed was described in court as a "pack chase:" up to ten young men pursued Hafidah through rush-hour traffic, wielding at least one handgun and other weapons. They cornered him on Moss Lane East. One attacker struck Hafidah with a car, knocking him down. The group then set upon him—beating him with a hammer and stabbing him repeatedly. The ferocity of the attack shocked even veteran detectives. Hafidah bled to death in the street as bystanders watched in horror.

Police later confirmed this was a revenge killing: days earlier, Hafidah had allegedly attacked an AO member. AO—a splinter faction of the old Moss Side Bloods—took matters into their own hands. In 2017, following two trials, six men (ages 17–20) were convicted of Hafidah's murder under joint enterprise laws. It emerged in testimony that the Rusholme Crips and AO gangs had a fierce rivalry despite their youth—one witness likened their conflict to imported Los Angeles Crips/Bloods culture (blue vs. red flags).

The Hafidah case received national attention for its savagery, while Manchester rapper Geko has paid tribute to Hafidah in his song titled Word, Hafidah also reportedly featured in the music video for "Baba" by Geko. It highlighted the persistence of gang culture among a new generation in South Manchester, even after the Gooch and Doddington had essentially ceased to exist in their original form.

Community members also noted that young Libyan-heritage men (like Hafidah) were now involved where Afro-Caribbean gangs once predominated.

=== Murder of Miguel Reynolds ===
On 7 June 2018 Miguel "Migz" Reynolds, 21, was shot dead in a robbery-gone-wrong after being lured from Manchester to Liverpool. Reynolds was an up-and-coming rapper linked to Chorlton's M21/C Block gang. A Merseyside gang led by Liam Watson offered to sell him an Audi for £2,000. Miguel traveled to the Netherton area of Liverpool with cash in hand. When he met the sellers in a cul-de-sac, they took his money and refused to hand over the car, effectively robbing him. A scuffle ensued and Watson brandished a Glock pistol. Reynolds, unarmed initially (though he had a pocketknife), chased after the thieves, determined to retrieve his money. In a fenced garden, Watson turned and shot Miguel at point-blank range in the neck, killing him. A shocked elderly resident witnessed the execution and called 999.

This case was significant as it highlighted the Gooch Gang's declining power in the mid-late 2010s, it also showed how social media and music connections were blurring traditional turf lines—Miguel had arranged the deal through intermediaries online. In April 2021, at Liverpool Crown Court, Liam Watson, 32, was found guilty of murder and jailed for life (minimum 30 years). An accomplice was convicted of manslaughter. The trial revealed the plan to rob Reynolds and how it turned lethal when he fought back.

Manchester's community honoured Reynolds's memory with tributes in rap songs such as "Good Die Young" by Remdeucee and "Doin it for Migz" by Tunde.

=== 2019: Gooch Gang arms conspiracy ===
In 2019, Greater Manchester Police foiled a firearms supply plot involving remnants of the Gooch Gang. An undercover sting tracked a crew of gang members who were conspiring to purchase and distribute a sawed-off shotguns to other criminals.

In April 2019, armed officers swept in and arrested the gang as money and the cut-down 12-gauge shotgun exchanged hands. The recovered shotgun, though old, was in working order and could have caused devastation in gang turf attacks.
