= 2020 Moss Side shooting =

Crime in Manchester, England

- Location: Moss Side, Manchester, United Kingdom
- Date: 21 June 2020; 12:30 am
- Attack type: Shooting
- Deaths: 2
- Injuries: 0

At about 12:30 am on 21 June 2020, two young men were shot dead at a street party in Moss Side, an inner-city area of Manchester in North West England.

== Background ==
The shooting took place at an afterparty, illegal under COVID-19 lockdown rules. The after party was an unplanned event that followed a Black Lives Matter barbecue that had been earlier held nearby, but was unconnected to this prior event, which peacefully finished at 20:00.

== Incident ==
During a night time street party in a car park in Moss Side at the junction of Caythorpe Street, Broadfield Road, and Bowes Street a man opened fire on those attending at about 00:30 BST, causing them to run screaming from the area. Gunshot was reported at a location on Caythorpe Street, with armed police responding to the scene at 01:00. They discovered a party attended by hundreds of people, in violation of COVID-19 lockdown guidelines in the country at the time. The police report that a "community event" had taken place in the area earlier in the day, and the party had been an unplanned after party but still had a DJ. A local resident said the party had begun at around 22:00 the night before, and that Moss Side was a peaceful neighbourhood with infrequent spikes of violent activity.

== Casualties ==
The two fatally wounded men self-presented at an Accident and Emergency department, either shortly before 01:00 (according to the police) or at about 01:30 (according to the Manchester Evening News). Both men, aged 21 and 36, died shortly after arriving at the hospital.

== Investigation ==
A murder investigation was opened the same day. On 26 June 2020, a 32-year-old Birmingham woman was arrested on suspicion of the murder of the two men. By September she had been released on bail, while a 25-year-old man had been arrested. A month later the police indicated they were looking for another suspect.
