= Anthony "White Tony" Johnson =

English gang member (1968–1991)

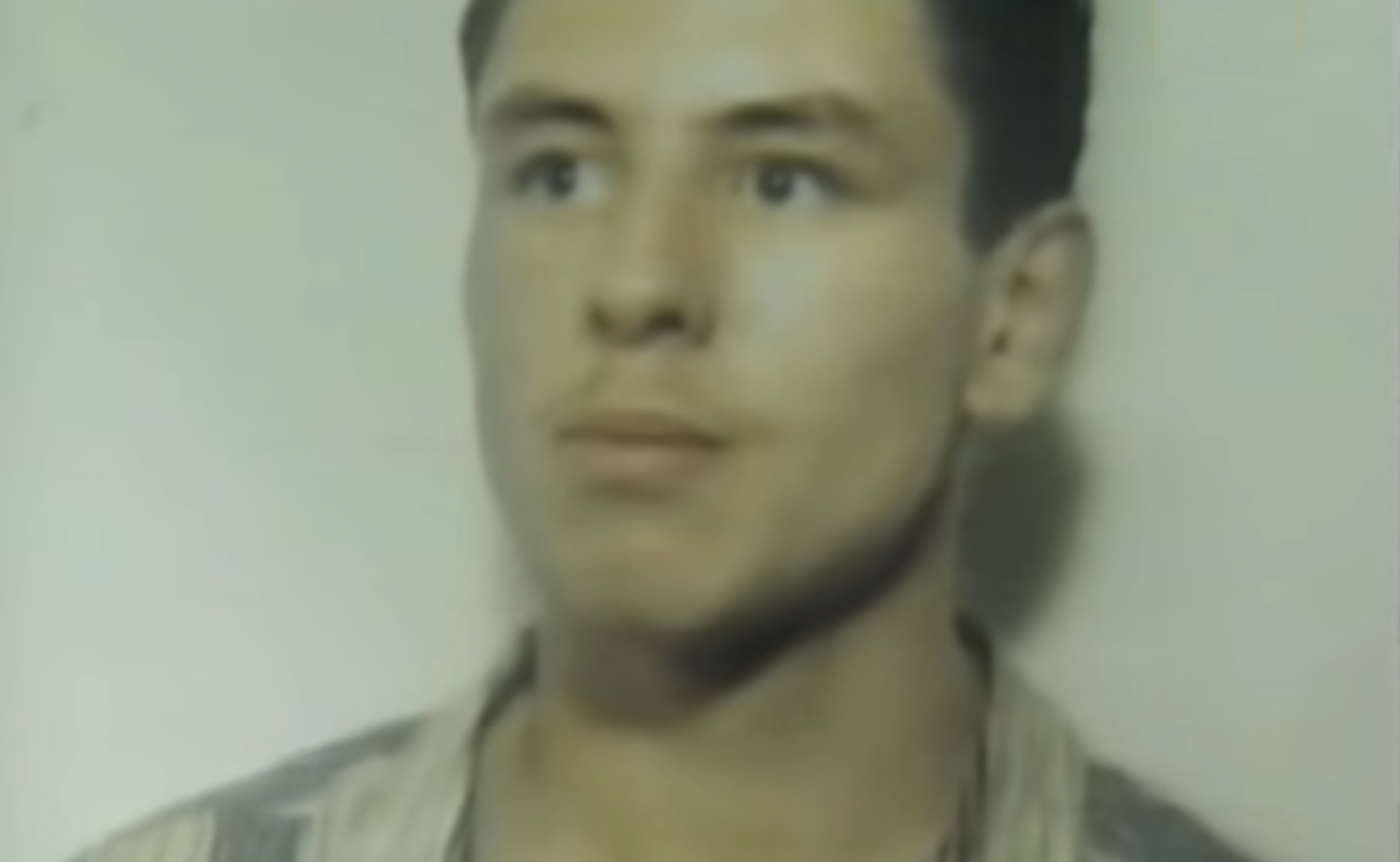
- Johnson 1990
- Born: Anthony James Johnson; 22 July 1968; Manchester, England
- Died: February 22, 1991 (aged 22); Penny Black pub, Cheetham Hill, Manchester, England
- Cause of death: Shooting
- Resting place: Southern Cemetery, Barlow Moor Road, Chorlton-cum-Hardy, Manchester
- Other names: Johnson; White Tony
- Occupation: Criminal
- Years active: 1984–1991
- Known for: Member of the Cheetham Hill Gang
- Opponent: Desmond Noonan
- Criminal status: Deceased
- Allegiance: Cheetham Hill Gang
- Time at large: 1984–1991

Anthony James "White Tony" Johnson (22 July 1968 – 22 February 1991) was an English criminal, and member of the organised Cheetham Hill Gang in Manchester.

He was gunned down in 1991 in the car park of the Penny Black pub, Cheetham Hill. The crime boss Desmond Noonan was tried but acquitted for his murder.

== Early life ==
Johnson was brought up in a home mired in tragedy and family breakdown. His mother Susan was 15 when she gave birth to him. Neither she nor his biological father spent much time with him. Susan was the step-sister of Keith Bennett, one of the five known Moors Murders victims, who went missing in June 1964 at the age of 12 - Ian Brady and Myra Hindley admitted murdering him in 1986, but his body has never been found. Susan's father Jimmy Johnson was the husband of Keith Bennett's mother Winnie, and had been treated as a suspect over his step-son's disappearance for several years after his disappearance, even though at the same time local police also suspected that he may have been murdered by Brady and Hindley.

For most of Johnson's childhood, he lived with his step-grandmother, Winnie Johnson, in her semi-detached house in Aston avenue Fallowfield, South Manchester. Johnson left school at the age of 16 in 1984. He befriended Tony McKie, often called "Black Tony", as well as the Adetoro Brothers, who would later be famous for their shootout with police on the M6 in April 2000, leading to Olatunde Yakub Adertoro's eight back-to-back life sentences. All of them were members of the Cheetham Hill Gang. They gradually became full-time members of the Hillbillies.

== Gang involvement ==
The Cheetham Hillbillies operated in the Waterloo Estate in the 1980s and 1990s. The gang specialized in robberies, pushing drugs in clubs and violence. Johnson had been involved in the Cheetham Hill Gang for years prior to his death. Johnson began as a lowly member of the gang, often committing robberies and gang member killings. His nickname, "White Tony", was a reference to his race, while in a predominantly Black gang. He killed 26-year Anthony "Scratch" Gardner on Saturday, 9 January 1988. As Gardner drew up outside a shebeen on Saturday, January 9, 1988, Johnson stepped out of the shadows, pulled a sawed-off shotgun from under his coat, pressed it against Gardner’s chest and fired. It took Gardner about a minute to die. Police found more than £1,000-worth of abandoned heroin and cocaine. He became the driver and bodyguard for the then leader of The Cheetham Hill Hillbillies.

In February 1990, the Pepperhill Mob lost one and a half kilos of heroin from a contact the gang had in London. Two people carrying the heroin were arrested and the heroin was seized, which led to a drought of heroin in Manchester and left the Pepperhill Mob vulnerable. Johnson moved on this, which led to a Cheetham Hill-Moss Side gang war. Johnson and a few Cheetham Hill Gang members tipped Pepperhill Mob leader Delroy Brown's car over in front of hundreds of people at a festival in Moss Side, to prove their power and intent towards the rival gang.

In 1990, Johnson was spotted by police in a Kevlar vest with semi-automatic firearms. This was a major discovery by the police, as they previously had little knowledge of the weapons and equipment used by gangs in Manchester. The police began multiple operations to seize guns and drugs from the Hillbillies, with little impact. Johnson, with other gang members, was at the West Indian Carnival in Chapeltown, Leeds, when a scuffle at the carnival led to a shootout. Multiple people were shot, many of whom were not gang members. This led to Johnson's arrest. Two gang members accompanying Johnson were imprisoned, while Johnson was released.

Johnson was involved in many other criminal activities, including a £362,000 security van robbery at Mumps Bridge, Oldham, in November 1990, which led to his feud with the Noonans. A month later, he robbed Bassett's sweet factory in Sheffield, with two other masked gunmen, netting around £78,000.

== Club-related violence ==
Johnson had a reputation for getting into fights in The Haçienda. A regular doorman left and was replaced with a London security firm. The violence escalated. Two weeks after the replacement, Johnson threatened one of the doormen with a gun. Tony Wilson was so aggravated by gang attacks, mainly from Johnson, that he agreed to temporarily close The Haçienda. The Hillbillies then resumed attacking club goers and staff. Johnson threatened one of the doormen with a gun, leading Tony Wilson to again close The Haçienda. He made a spectacle to try to get the police to intervene so that he could re-open.

== Death ==
At a New Year party in 1991, a gun-toting 22-year-old Johnson threatened some of Damian Noonan's successors on the door at The Haçienda. Johnson was already in trouble with members of the Noonan family because of a dispute over the division of the spoils from a £362,000 security van robbery at Mumps Bridge, Oldham, in November 1990. He was shot in the car park of the Penny Black pub, Winterford Road, Cheetham Hill, in February 1991. The pub, which was closed and torched shortly after the attack, was partly owned by Derek Noonan of the Irish-Mancunian crime family. Desmond Noonan, brother of Domenyk, was tried and acquitted for the murder.

The gun battle started when Johnson was ambushed in the car park of the Penny Black pub. Johnson was with "Black Tony" McKie, and was driving along in his white Ford Cosworth when they were flagged down by two men in a car in the pub car park. Their escape was blocked by a taxi with Paul Flannery inside. Flannery shot McKie, then brothers Desmond, Derek and Damian Noonan, along with Michael Sharples, joined in the attack. Johnson was injured but began to run and tried to vault a wall, but was shot in the back. Someone then shouted "finish him off" and two more shots were fired, killing Johnson.

Johnson's funeral was attended by over 200 people. A 30-car motorcade pulled up to the Southern Cemetery, Barlow Moor Road, Chorlton-cum-Hardy, Manchester. So many people attended the funeral that the service spilled from the chapel to the main graveyard. The Noonan gang were tried twice for Johnson's murder. The first trial in 1992 collapsed, while the second in 1993 ended in acquittals. In 1999, Damian Noonan was shot while on the door at the Phoenix Club in the city.

Johnson was survived by three children.
