= Moss Side =

Inner-city area of Manchester, England

Coordinates: 53.456°N 2.240°W

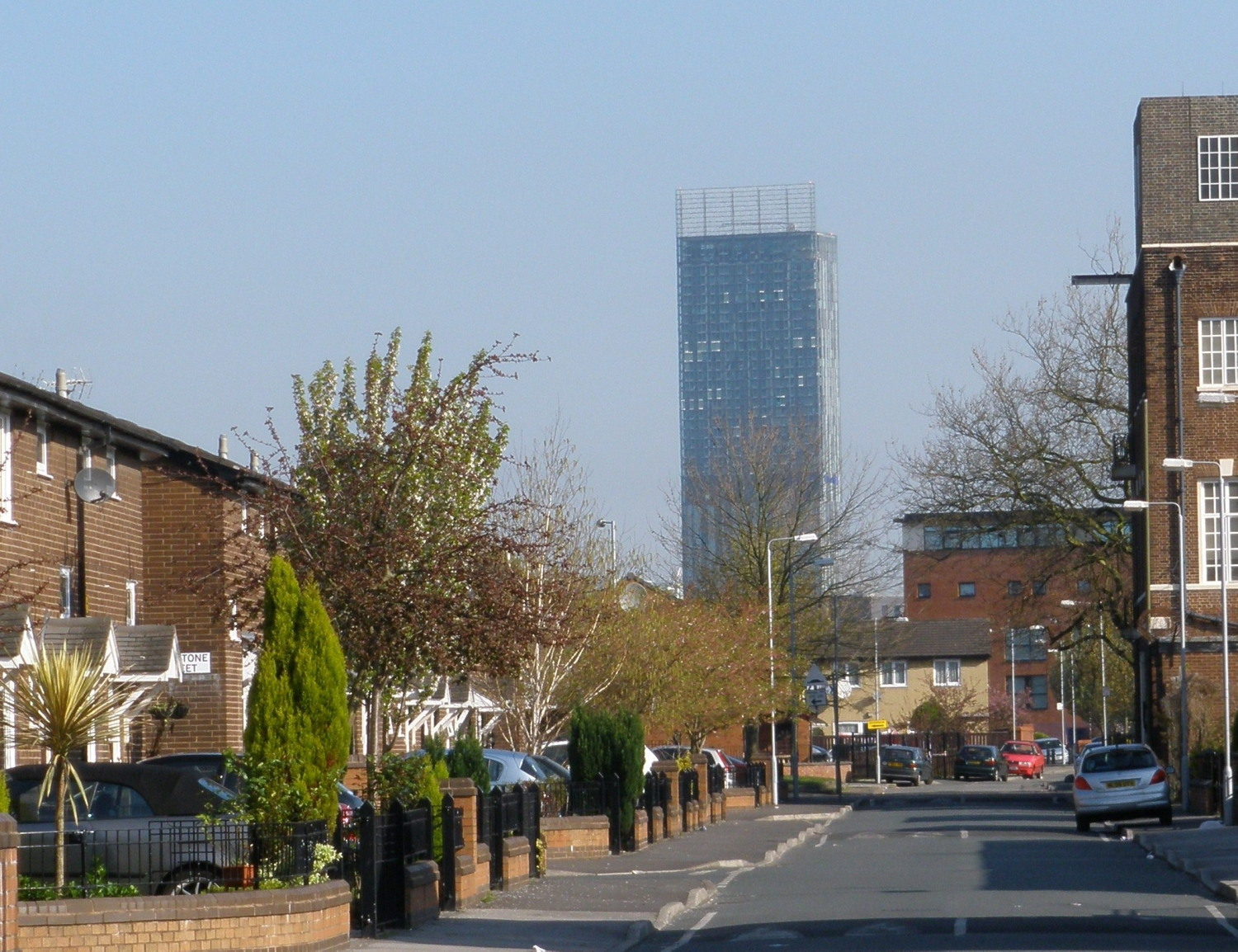
- Alexandra Park Estate, looking towards the Beetham Tower

- Location within Greater Manchester
- Population: 20,745 (2021)
- OS grid reference: SJ835955
  - London: 162 mi (261 km) SE
- Metropolitan borough: Manchester
- Metropolitan county: Greater Manchester
- Region: North West
- Country: England
- Sovereign state: United Kingdom
- Post town: MANCHESTER
- Postcode district: M14, M16
- Dialling code: 0161
- Police: Greater Manchester
- Fire: Greater Manchester
- Ambulance: North West
- UK Parliament: Manchester Rusholme
- Councillors: Thirza Asanga-Rae (Green); Mahadi Hussein Sharif Mahamed (Labour); Esha Mumtaz (Labour)

Moss Side is an inner-city area of Manchester, in Greater Manchester, England; it lies 1.9 miles (3.1 km) south of the city centre. It had a population of 20,745 at the 2021 census. Moss Side is bounded by Hulme to the north, Chorlton-on-Medlock, Rusholme and Fallowfield to the east, Whalley Range to the south, and Old Trafford to the west.

As well as Whitworth Park and Alexandra Park, Moss Side is close to Manchester and Manchester Metropolitan universities. Manchester City Football Club played at Maine Road between 1923 and 2003.

== History ==
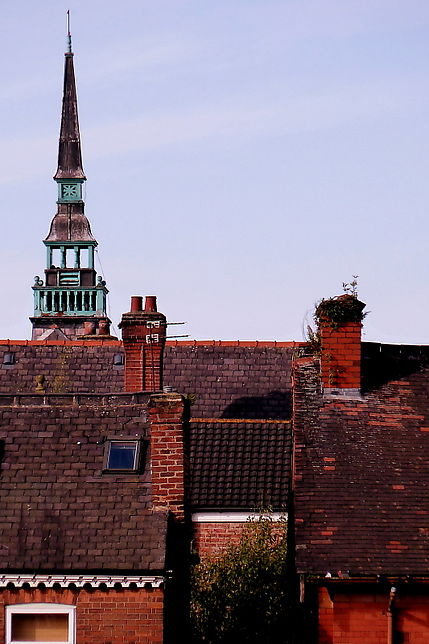
The bell tower of former Greenheys School

Historically part of Lancashire, Moss Side was a rural township and chapelry within the parish of Manchester and hundred of Salford. Thought to be named after a great moss which stretched from Rusholme to Chorlton-cum-Hardy, the earliest mention of the area is in 1533 when it contained part of the estates of Trafford. Moss Side is described in the opening chapter of Elizabeth Gaskell's Mary Barton as a rural idyll with a "deep clear pool" and an old black and white timber-framed farmhouse, later identified as Pepperhill Farm.

Following the Industrial Revolution there was a process of unplanned urbanisation and a rapid increase in population size. In 1866, Moss Side became a separate civil parish; from 1894 to 1904, it was an urban district. The parish was abolished on 1 October 1910 and was merged with that of South Manchester. The parish population in 1801 was 151 but, by 1901, it had increased to 26,677. The industrial growth of the area resulted in a densely populated area; so much so that a part of the township of Moss Side was amalgamated into the expanding city of Manchester in 1885, with the rest joining in 1904.

Mass development in Moss Side occurred in the late 19th and early 20th centuries, when large numbers of red brick terraced houses were built; these soon attracted numerous Irish immigrants and other working people.

Manchester City F.C. moved to a new stadium on Maine Road on 25 August 1923, from Hyde Road, in Ardwick; on its opening, it was one of the most capacious sports stadiums in the United Kingdom, capable of holding up to 85,000 spectators. The club would play there for the next 80 years.

During the Manchester Blitz in the Second World War, many of the terraced houses were damaged by German bombing on the night of 22/23 December 1940. Migrants from the Indian subcontinent and Caribbean settled in the locality during the 1950s and 1960s; by the 1980s, Moss Side was the hub of Manchester's Afro-Caribbean community. During the 1960s and early 1970s, Manchester City Council demolished many of the Victorian and terraced houses to the west of Moss Side and replaced these with new council houses and flats. Most of the newer properties, built around the turn of the 20th century, were refurbished instead during the final two decades of the century.

In 1981, the Moss Side area was one of England's inner city areas affected by a series of riots. Analysts traced the 1970s origins of Manchester's gang crime to social deprivation in the south-central part of the city – Hulme, Longsight and Moss Side – where the activity of the underground economy encouraged a trade in illegal narcotics and firearms contributing to Manchester's later nickname of "Gunchester". "Turf wars" between rival drugs gangs resulted in a high number of fatal shootings. During what has been termed the Madchester phase of the history of Manchester, narcotic trade in the city became "extremely lucrative" and, in the early 1990s, a gang war started between two groups vying for control of the market in Manchester city centre: the Cheetham Hill Gang and the Gooch Close Gang, in Cheetham Hill and Moss Side respectively. There were several high-profile shootings associated with gangs and drugs in this area during the 1990s and into the 21st century. Gang-related shootings in the area have fallen by about 90% in recent years; this has been aided by the work of Xcalibre, the Greater Manchester Police's task force that was founded in 2004, and the multi-agency Integrated Gang Management Unit.

Many of the flats in neighbouring Hulme were demolished in the early 1990s, to make way for new low-rise homes. Housing on the Alexandra Park Estate in the west of Moss Side has been renovated and the streets redesigned to reduce the fear of crime.

== Governance ==
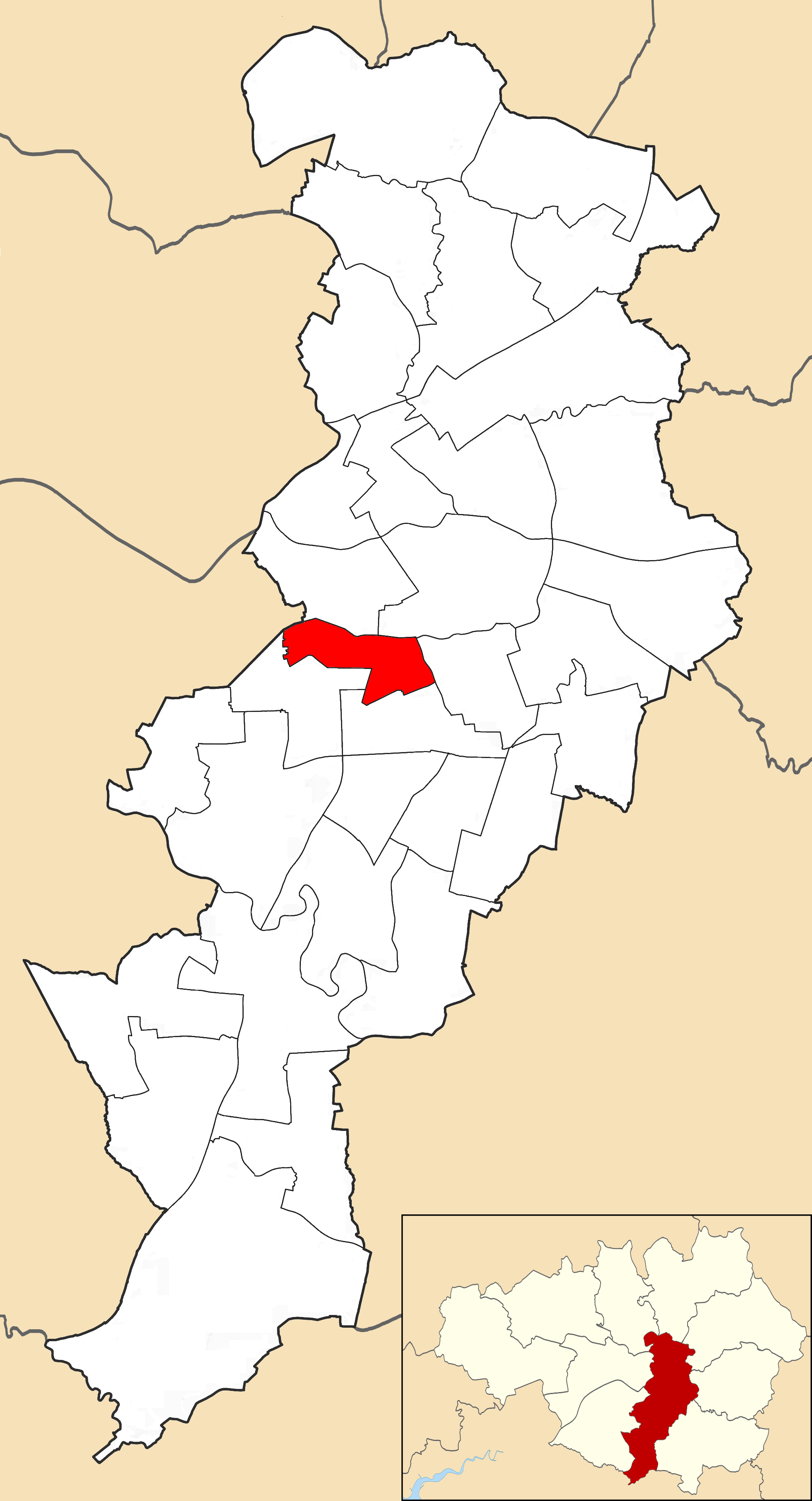
The Moss Side electoral ward within Manchester City Council

The majority of Moss Side is part of the Manchester Central constituency, represented by the Labour Party MP Lucy Powell. Following boundary changes in 2018, a portion of the ward is a part of the Manchester Gorton constituency, represented by the Labour MP Afzal Khan.

Moss Side is a ward within the local authority of Manchester City Council. The ward is represented by three councillors; since 2021, these have been:

Election	Councillor	Councillor	Councillor
2021	Mahadi Hussein Sharif Mahamed (Lab)	Emily Rowles (Lab)	Sameem Ali (Lab)
2022	Mahadi Hussein Sharif Mahamed (Lab)	Emily Rowles (Lab)	Erinma Bell (Lab)
2023	Mahadi Hussein Sharif Mahamed (Lab)	Emily Rowles (Lab)	Erinma Bell (Lab)
2024	Mahadi Hussein Sharif Mahamed (Lab)	Esha Mumtaz (Lab)	Erinma Bell (Lab)
2026	Mahadi Hussein Sharif Mahamed (Lab)	Esha Mumtaz (Lab)	Thirza Asanga-Rae (Grn)

== Geography ==
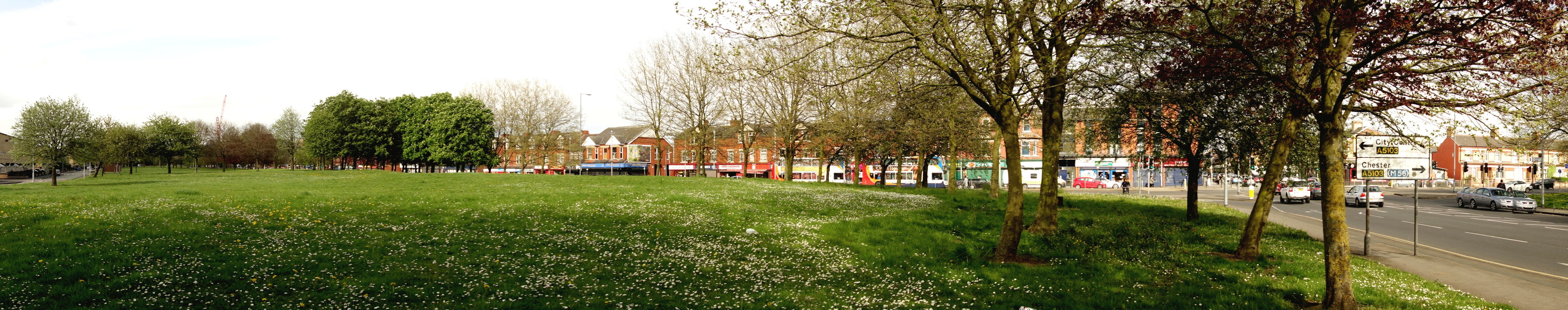
Princess Road and Princess Park

The western border of the Moss Side Ward is bounded in part by Withington Road. Parts of the eastern border are bounded by Wilmslow Road, where it meets Whitworth Park, and Parkfield Street. To the south, the border includes Alexandra Park, Horton Road and part of Platt Lane. To the north, the ward border mainly runs along Moss Lane East.

The built environment of Moss Side is broadly characterised as a high-density residential area. This includes mainly Victorian and Edwardian terraces to the east and centre, with more recent developments, primarily the Alexandra Park Estate, built in the 1970s to the west of Princess Road.

The Moss Side Sports and Leisure Complex, north of Moss Lane West, was upgraded for the 2002 Commonwealth Games and has a gym and a variety of other sporting facilities.

=== Redevelopment and regeneration ===
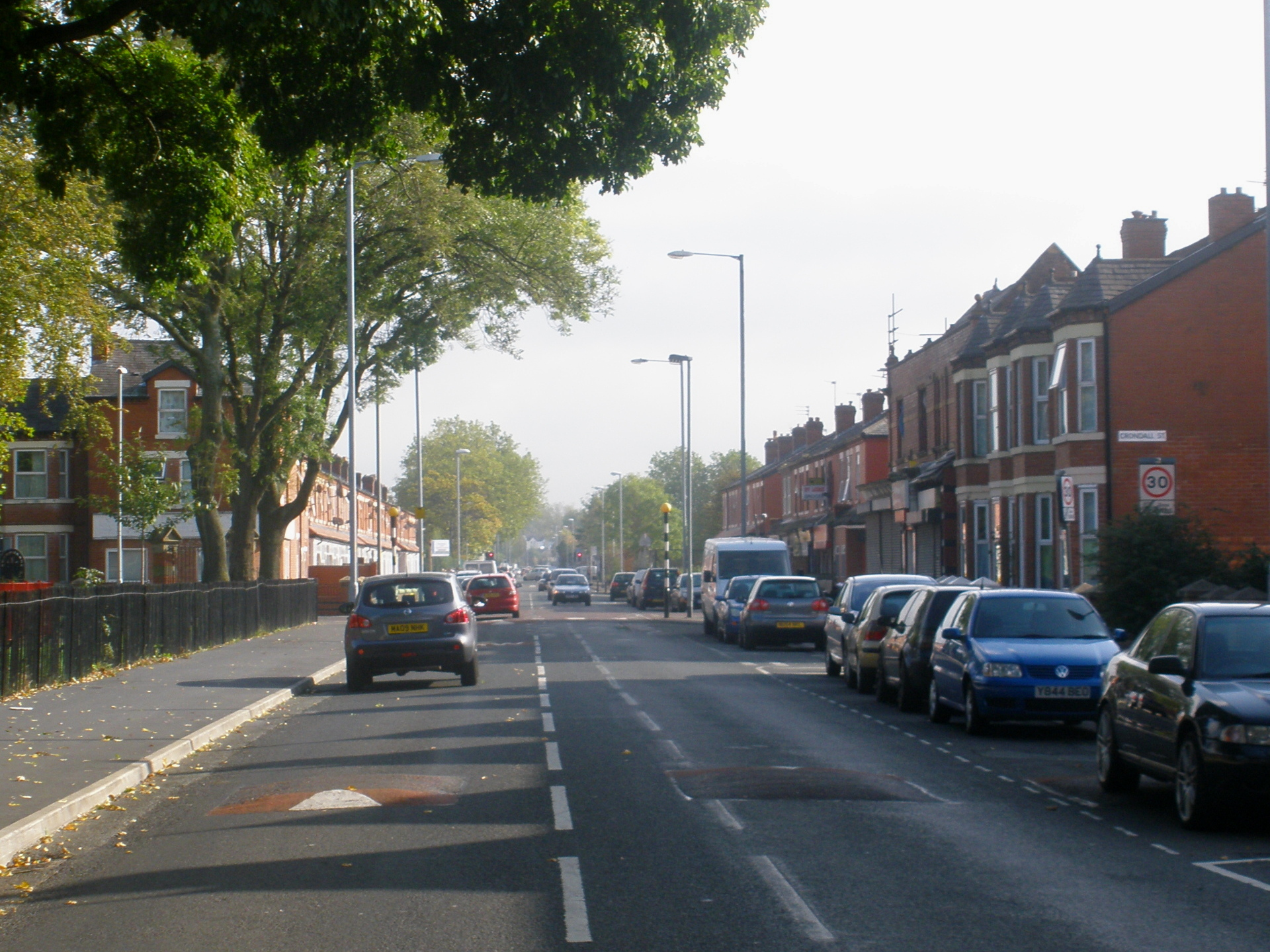
Great Western Street runs through the centre of Moss Side

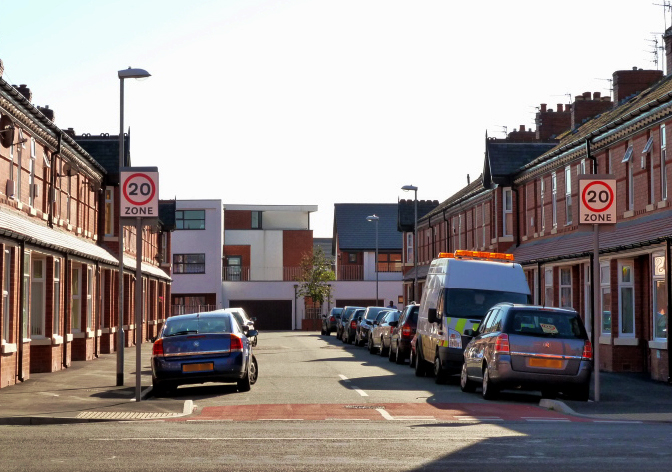
Wykeham Street, with the Maine Place development in the background

Moss Side has benefited from very substantial redevelopment and regeneration since the mid-1990s, including improvement of the existing housing and residential environment along with several major housing projects currently in process or nearing completion. There has been considerable renovation of existing housing stock, such as local terrace housing and the Alexandra Park Estate.

A large site on Great Western Street has been developed by Moss Care Housing Ltd. to provide a mix of two, three and four-bedroom properties, with different tenures, some rental and others offered as shared ownership or for sale.

The former Maine Road stadium site was redeveloped between 2011 and 2018. The site was marketed as Maine Place, primarily as two, three and four-bedroom houses with one block of flats; a new primary school, Divine Mercy, was also built there. A health centre was in the original plans, but was never built.

The Bowes Street area, adjoining Princess Road, has been redeveloped at the cost of £17 million; this included the renovation or transformation, with some new build, of 155 properties in five streets. Reported as being "built or converted to a very high standard of eco-friendliness, with solar panels, water butts, thermal "skin insulation and sun pipes being used" and aiming to offer homes with 'low running costs', the development plan states its aim, along with that at Maine Road, as being to provide mixed type "higher specification" housing, "diversify tenure" and promote the area as a "neighbourhood of choice."

Marketed as Infusion Homes, the properties were launched on the market on 26 February 2011. On 9 May, sales demand was reported as strong, with 60% of the properties having been sold. On 11 May, the development was awarded the UK's Best Affordable Housing Scheme at the national Housing Excellence Awards 2011.

Land adjacent to the development, formerly occupied by Bilsborrow primary school and the Stagecoach bus garage, was cleared as part of regeneration, remains vacant with no clear future use at present, though local community groups have short term plans to use the space for a gardening/food growing project.

The impact of regeneration and redevelopment in changing perceptions of the area was demonstrated in The Guardian, when Moss Side appeared in the long running Let's Move To series.

In March 2026, the government announced that the area, part of which is now in the Whalley Range ward, would be included in the Pride in Place programme which would mean up to £20m of investment over ten years.

=== Demography ===
In 2007, the Moss Side ward was estimated to have a total population of 17,537, of which 8,785 were male and 8,752 were female. Moss Side is noted as an area with a greater population density and a faster population growth than other areas of the city of Manchester, with an increase of 17.4% between 2001 and 2007.

Data points to a significant shift in the demography of Moss Side; there are more people in the 'under 10' and '25–35' age groups, suggesting an increase in families with younger children. Other sources indicate an accompanying change in Moss Side's ethnic population, with an estimated marked percentage increase in the Afro-Caribbean, Indian, Somali, Chinese and Eastern European communities between 2007 and 2015.

Estimated change in age groups for 2011 and 2015
Moss Side	All persons		Change 2007–11:		Change 2011–15:	
Moss Side	2011	2015	Number	% change	Number	% change
All ages	18,745	19,794	1208	6.9%	1048	5.6%
0–4	1,841	1,995	317	20.8%	154	8.4%
5–9	1,317	1,551	116	9.6%	234	17.8%
10–14	902	959	-133	-12.8%	56	6.2%
15–19	1,445	1,332	-149	-9.3%	-113	-7.8%
20–24	2,898	2,770	146	5.3%	-128	-4.4%
25–29	2,483	2,643	414	20.0%	160	6.4%
30–34	1,759	2,103	394	28.9%	344	19.5%
35–39	1,098	1,244	6	0.5%	147	13.4%
40–44	1,052	1,057	46	4.6%	5	0.5%
45–49	863	899	67	8.4%	36	4.2%
50–54	668	724	31	4.9%	56	8.4%
55–59	476	528	-36	-7.1%	52	10.9%
60–64	524	493	90	20.8%	-31	-5.9%
65–69	460	537	-23	-4.8%	77	16.7%
70–74	383	368	-27	-6.6%	-15	-3.8%
75–79	284	294	-22	-7.1%	10	3.6%
80–84	177	174	-28	-13.4%	-3	-2.0%
85+	115	122	-1	-1.0%	8	6.6%
Manchester	492,800	520,500	34,664	7.6%	27,700	5.6%

== Industry ==
=== Brewing ===
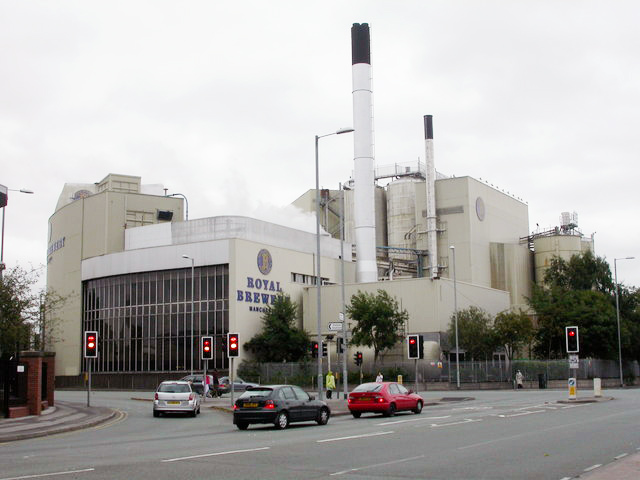
The Royal Brewery

Moss Side has a long history of brewing, dating from the 19th century. The Royal Brewery has had several owners, previously brewing brands such as Kestrel, McEwan's and Harp Lager; it is now owned by Heineken for the production of Foster's. There has been a brewery on this site since 1875. Originally built as the Albert Brewery, it had become known as the Moss Side Brewery by 1915. A report in the 1880s commented:

"The water at the brewery is of exceptionally good quality, containing all the necessary elements for producing the finest ales, which cannot be surpassed in the district for their brightness, purity and flavour."

The brewery was later acquired by Walker and Homfrays, and was merged into Wilsons in 1949. It then merged with Webster's Brewery in 1985, was sold to Courage in 1990, before its takeover by Heineken in 2008. Prior to its expansion, part of the site of the Royal Brewery, where Moss Lane East meets Princess Road, was occupied by a library, fire station and police station.

Hydes Brewery on Moss Lane West was built in 1861, established by the Graetorix Brothers and originally known as the Queen's Brewery. It was sold to Hydes in 1898 and became known as Hydes Anvil Brewery. Beer was brewed at the site until 2012, when Hydes moved production to a new building in Salford. The brewery building itself is grade II listed and is awaiting redevelopment.

Established in 2010, the Moss Cider Project is a local community enterprise that takes donations of apples from trees in Moss Side and the surrounding area and makes them into cider and apple juice. Those who donate the apples get a share of what is produced.

=== Other industry ===
The northern England office of Aquatech Pressmain, which specialises in the 'supply of fluid pumping equipment to the Building Services, Process and Water Industries', is located in Moss Side.

Bridgewater Hospital, on Princess Road, is a private hospital that provides a range of healthcare treatments.

== Education ==
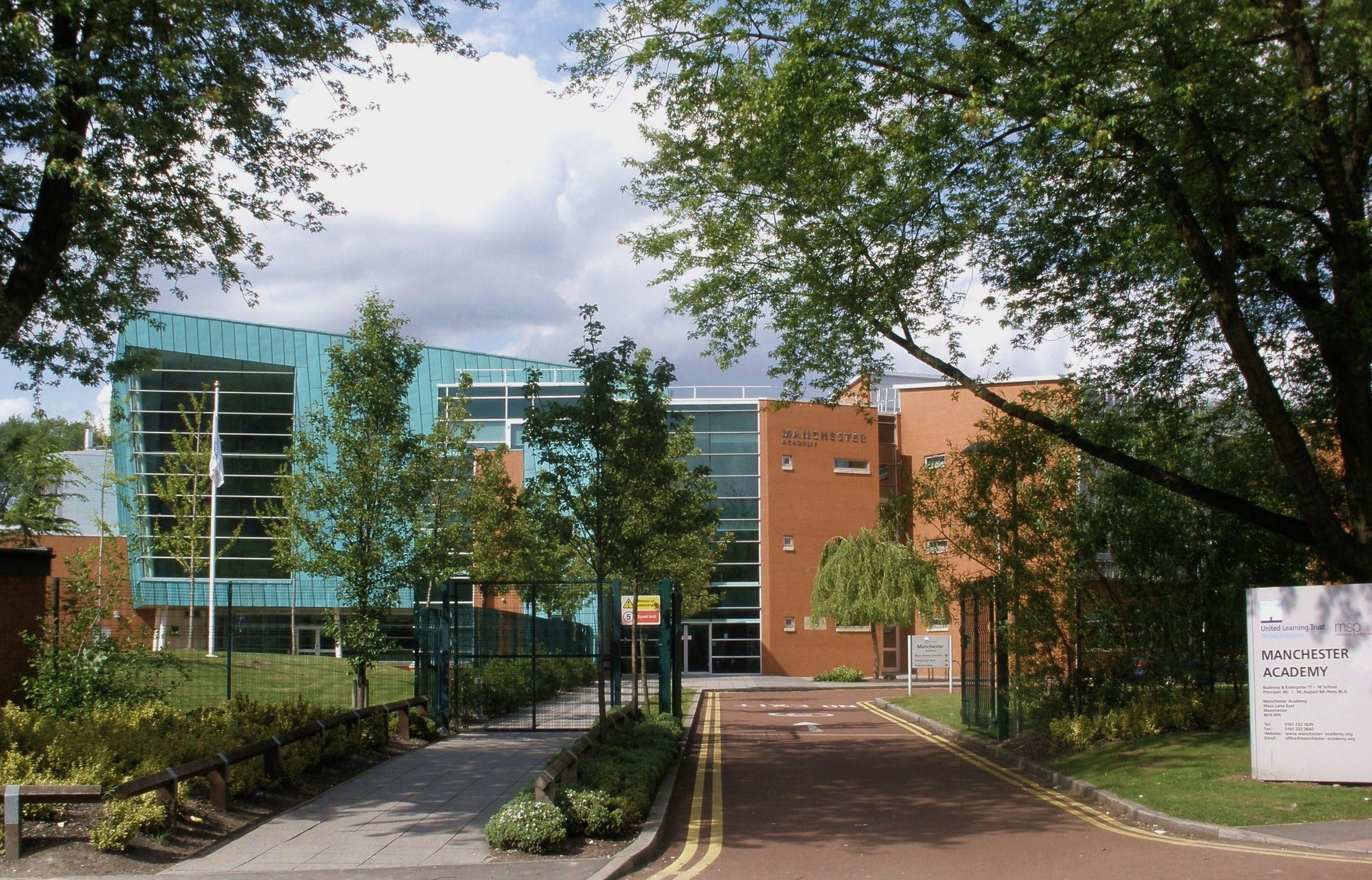
Manchester Academy school in Moss Side

In 2003, Ducie Central High School was replaced by the independently run Manchester Academy, with the aim of overcoming barriers to education and achievement faced by young people in the community. In April 2009, it was reported that the Academy has met with success in raising educational standards in the area and, by 2010, 81% of pupils achieved A*–C grades at GCSE, compared with 13% at the former Ducie High School. In November 2009, it won the Academy Partnership Award, at the UK Education Business Awards, whilst, in July 2010, Academy pupils were named as national debating finalists at the Debate Mate competition at the House of Lords. In December 2010, it was reported that this "once failing school was now named as one of [the] UK's best."

The area has five primary schools: Claremont Primary School, Devine Mercy RC Primary School, Holy Name RC Primary School, St Mary's CE Junior and Infant School, and Webster Primary School. In July 2014, St Mary's CE Junior and Infant School won the Times Educational Supplement national Primary School of the Year award.

The Windrush Millennium Centre on Alexandra Road provides facilities for courses of college and adult education, including some run by the City College Manchester and Manchester College of Arts and Technology. Manchester City Council runs the Greenheys Adult Learning Centre on Upper Lloyd Street.

There are nearest secondary schools, including St Peter's RC High School.

== Transport ==
Moss Side lies on either side of the A5103 (Princess Road), the main road out of Manchester to the south, towards Northenden, Manchester Airport, the M56 motorway and Chester. Parallel to this is Alexandra Road, which continues past Alexandra Park. (Note: Alexandra Road was formerly one of two main shopping streets in Moss Side.) Landmarks on Princess Road are the Royal Brewery and the bus depot, built originally for the tramways in 1909 and used by Stagecoach Manchester until 2010.

The majority of bus routes that serve the area are operated by Metroline Manchester, under the Bee Network branding; other operators include Stagecoach Manchester and Diamond North West. Routes connnect with town with Manchester city centre, Fallowfield, Rusholme, Withington, Didsbury and Wythenshawe. Inter-city coach services, operated by National Express and Flixbus, stop at Raby Street.

== Religion ==
The original St James's Church (Church of England), Princess Road, was built in 1887/8 (Note: The architect was John Lowe.) of red brick in the Perpendicular revival style. This has now been replaced by a modern brick building, which also contains offices used by local community groups.

Christ Church, Lloyd Street North, is an Anglican church of 1899–1904 by W. Cecil Hardisty and is a Grade II* listed building as of 24 April 1987.

Several evangelical churches congregate in Moss Side, including Revelation Church Manchester, which meets in the Moss Side Millennium Power House, Grace Church Manchester, which meets in the Manchester Academy building, Church of God of Prophecy on Raby Street and South Manchester Family Church, which meets at Manchester High School for Girls.

There are two Roman Catholic churches:

- the Church of Divine Mercy, a Polish church founded in 1961, which is on Moss Lane East;
- the Church of Our Lady of Perpetual Succour (founded 1949). The Polish church occupies a former Methodist chapel built about 1875 in the Neo-Gothic style and contains stained glass windows commemorating victims of the Holocaust. It is a few yards south of Christ Church.

The former Swedenborgian church also dates from 1888 and is Neo-Gothic in style. It was built to replace the previous Swedenborgian church in Peter Street, Manchester. On an adjacent site was the Church of the New Age (founded 1923) and there was also in Raby Street the Wesleyan Methodist Church.

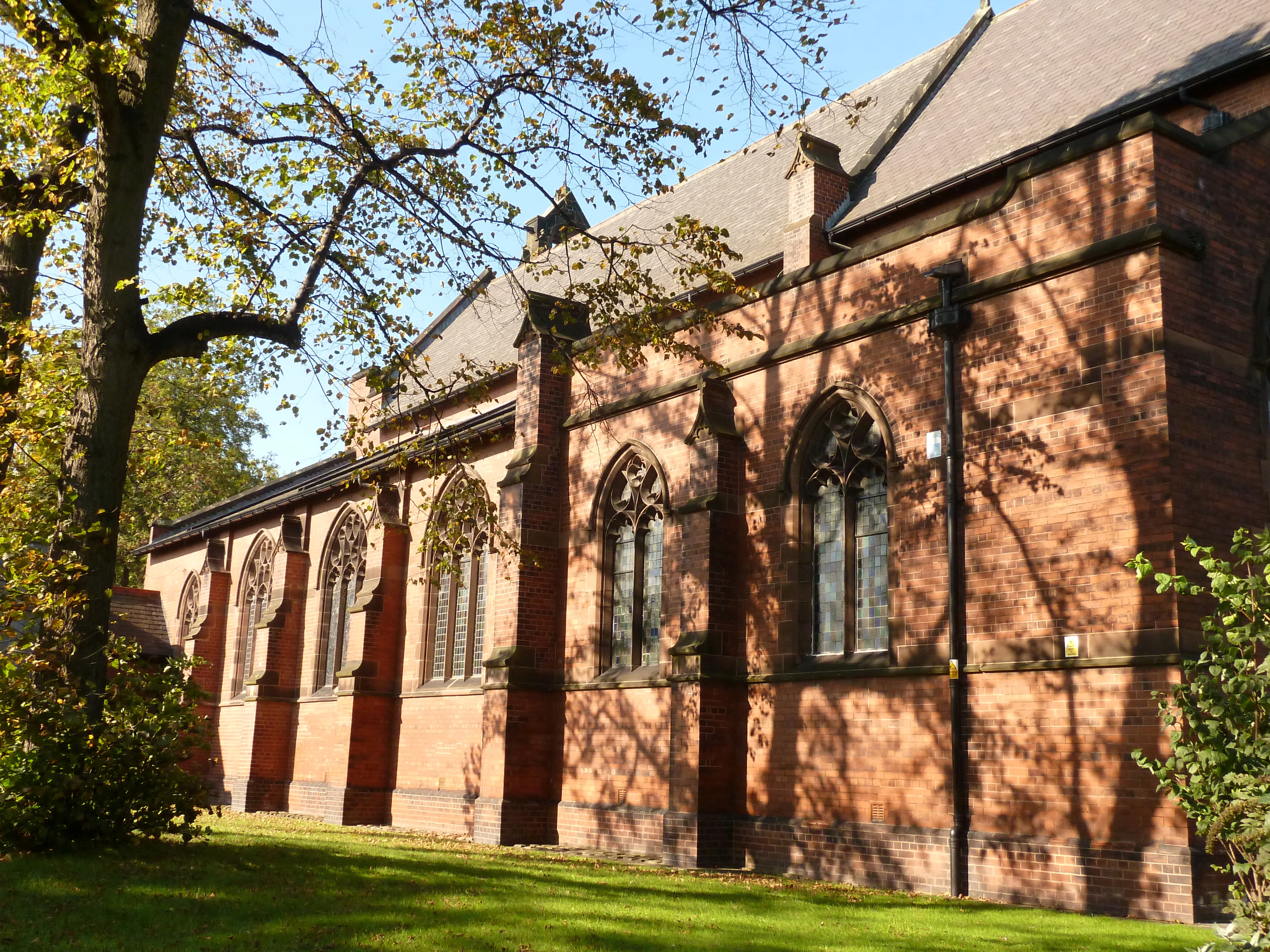
Christ Church

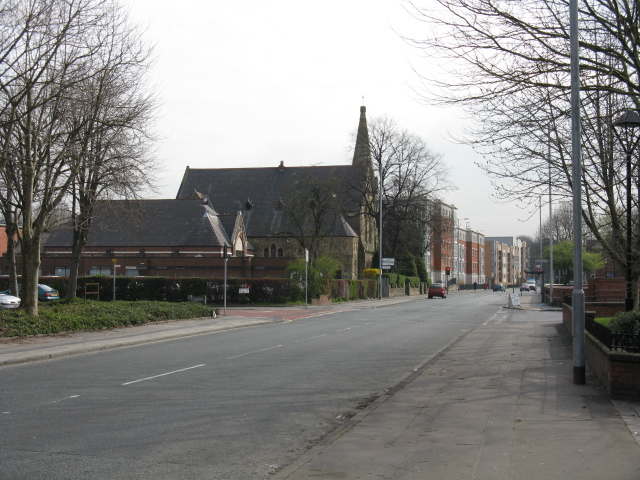
The Church of Divine Mercy

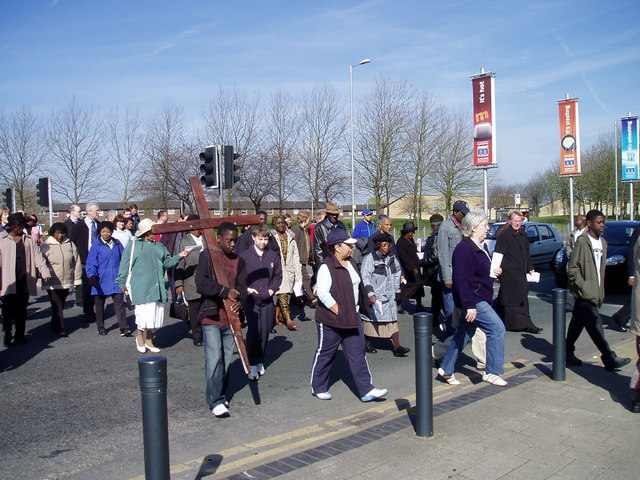
Good Friday walk, crossing Princess Road

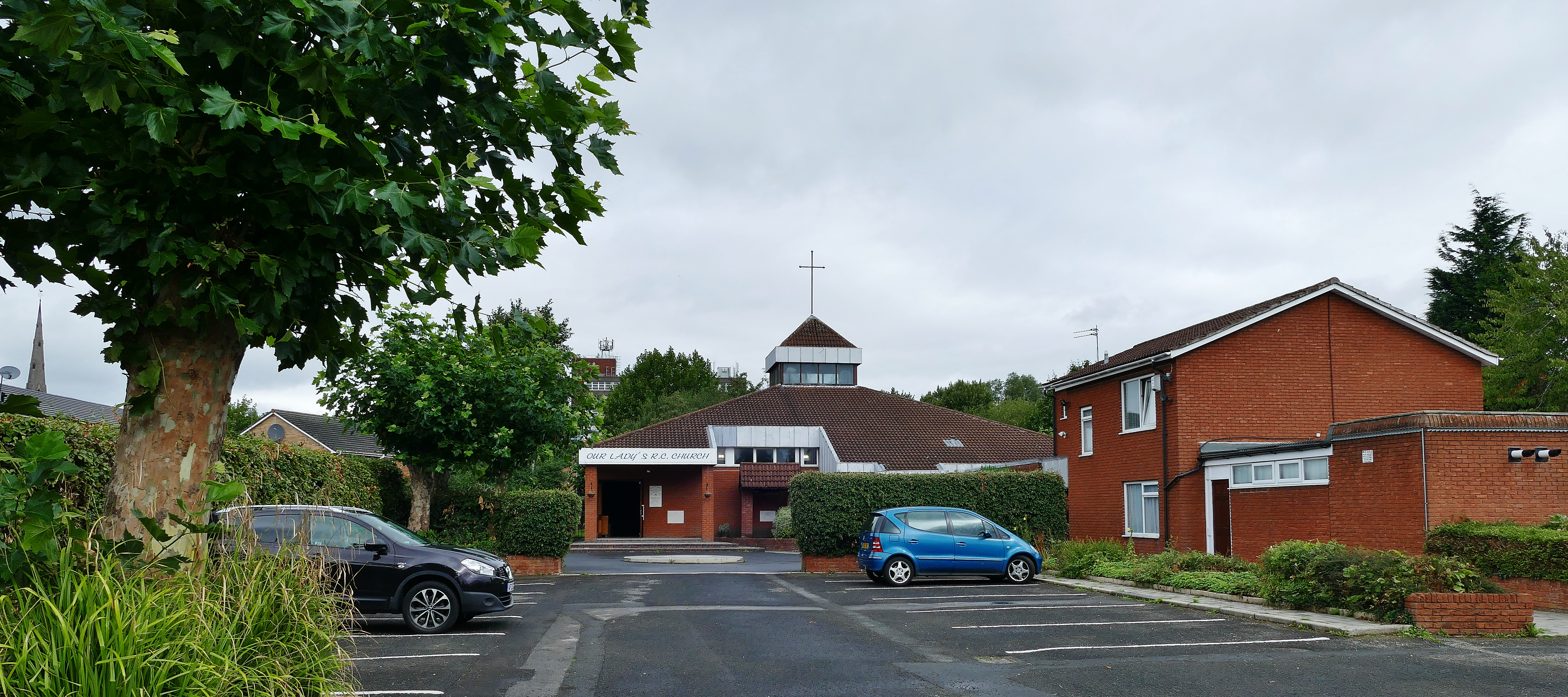
Our Lady's Church

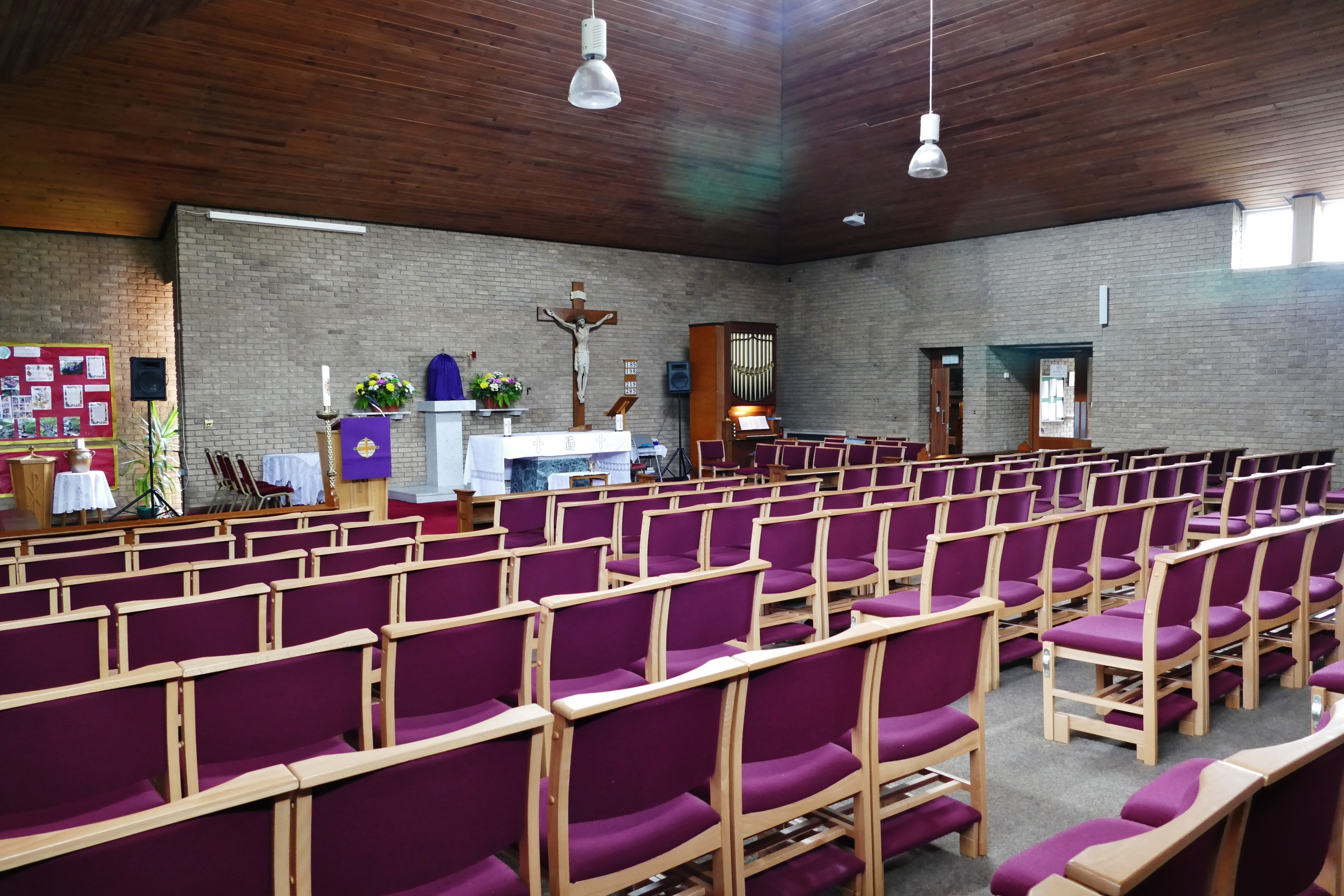
Our Lady's Church interior

== Crime ==
Moss Side has a high crime rate. In April 1994, The Independent newspaper highlighted the area as one of the most deprived areas in Britain and as having some of the highest crime rates. Drug abuse was described as one of the area's biggest problems, with gun crime rates being so high that there had recently been 400 armed incidents reported within a 12-month period. Ambulance crews had resorted to wearing body armour after having to deal with a string of mostly drug-related shootings. Several doctors had been robbed of medical bags at knife point after being called out to local patients. A number of police vehicles had been fire-bombed and there had been reports of attempted ambushes on police patrols. Unemployment stood at nearly 30%, up to three times the national average in the early 1990s.

The following stabbings and shootings happened in the area:

- 2018 Moss Side mass shooting
- 2020 Moss Side shooting.

== Culture and community ==
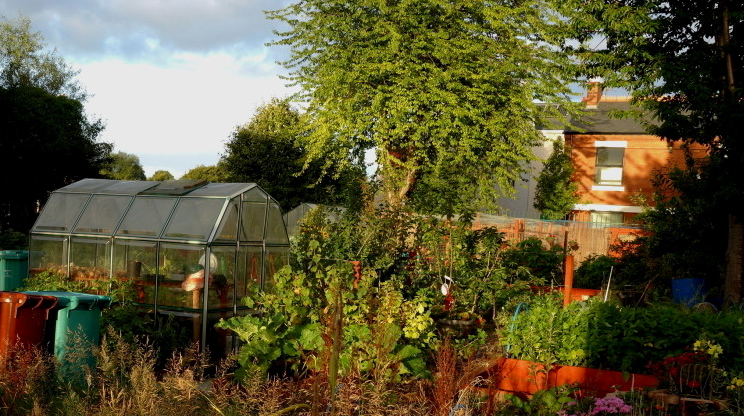
Moss Side Community Allotment

Moss Side has longstanding Afro-Caribbean and South Asian populations. There has also been a recent increase in residents from other communities, including those from Somalia and Eastern Europe.

A number of local community and voluntary groups provide social support, along with cultural and leisure opportunities to each of these communities. These organisations and institutions include the West Indian Sports and Social Club, the African and Caribbean Mental Health Service, and the African-Caribbean Care Group. The Caribbean Carnival of Manchester is also held in the area every August, usually in Alexandra Park. The Indian Senior Citizens group provides support for the elderly, with the Somali Bravanese Sisters and the Polish School Manchester catering to their communities.

The Reno was a late night club at the junction of Princess Road and Moss Lane East in Moss Side. The Reno and the Nile (upstairs from the Reno) were Manchester's most famous drinking clubs for the city's West Indian community and played a key role in the development of black culture in the city.

Moss Side is also home to a population with a keen interest in green politics and sustainable living, with initiatives such as the Moss Cider Project and Carbon Co-op. Moss Side Community Allotment states its aim as involving volunteers in growing and making available locally produced organic food. A local disused space, known as The Triangle, involved a community group in regenerating wasteground into a communal garden. Other groups, such as Bowes Street Residents Association have sought to 'green' the area through the use of alley gating and planting in contained alleys. The Meanwhile Garden, on the site of the former bus garage, is currently being turned into an apple orchard. With the aim of changing perceptions of the area, a group of local residents acting as community ambassadors, was also formed in January 2012.

The Millennium Powerhouse youth service caters for eight-to 25-year-old. It includes a music studio, fitness studio, dance studio and sports hall; it offers information and advice to young people, including a library, along with recreational and sport groups. Windrush Millennium Centre, which provides adult education and other community facilities, is situated on Alexandra Road. Additionally, the area features a number of Polish and Indian restaurants and eateries. It has also in recent years seen the opening of several Somali cafes.

Alexandra Park Health Centre is located in Whitswood Close.

== Sport ==
From 1923 until 2003, Moss Side was the location of Manchester City F.C.'s stadium at Maine Road, which drew crowds of more than 80,000 on several occasions in its early years. However, this was gradually reduced over the years and, by the mid-1990s, it held just under 35,000 spectators all-seated. Plans to rebuild the stadium to seat 45,000 were abandoned in favour of moving to the City of Manchester Stadium, which had been built for the 2002 Commonwealth Games.

== Notable people ==
- The political activist and women's suffrage leader Emmeline Pankhurst was born in Moss Side
- The author Anthony Burgess, although born in Harpurhey, lived in Moss Side as a child, as did the historian Michael Wood
- Frederick Engels lived in Moss Side for part of his time in Manchester (1842-4), where he wrote The Condition of the Working Class in England
- The clergyman and submarine inventor George Garrett was a Church of England vicar in Moss Side
- Bertha Jane Grundy the novelist was born at Moss Side in 1837.
- Community activist Kath Locke was a co-founder of the Abasindi Co-operative in 1980 and the Kath Locke Centre in Moss Side is named after her
- Philomena Lynott, the Irish mother of Thin Lizzy frontman Phil Lynott, lived in Moss Side with him in 1949-53, having found it as "a place where the single mother of a mixed-race baby would be accepted"
- The DJ "A Guy Called Gerald", whose real name was Gerald Simpson, grew up in Moss Side
- British rock musician and composer Barry Adamson was born in Moss Side. His debut solo album Moss Side Story is an imaginary soundtrack to a thriller set in Moss Side
- Raine Allen-Miller, spent her early childhood in Moss Side; her first feature film was Rye Lane.
