= British firms (organised crime) =

Organised Crime Groups operating in the United Kingdom

British crime firms
- Founded: 19th century
- Founding location: United Kingdom
- Territory: United Kingdom, Netherlands, Spain, and Thailand
- Ethnicity: Predominantly White British (including Scottish and Irish) with other ethnicities including Turkish Cypriot, South Asian and Black British
- Criminal activities: Racketeering, prostitution, bookmaking, drug trafficking, loan sharking, extortion, counterfeiting, robbery, bribery, contract killing, assault, gambling, arms trafficking and smuggling
- Allies: Turkish mafia Milieu; Penose; Kinahan Cartel; Australian syndicates
- Rivals: Israeli mafia Baybaşin family

British firms are organised crime groups originating in the United Kingdom.

== Organised crime in the United Kingdom ==
In analogy with the Penose in the Netherlands and the Milieu in France, organised crime in the United Kingdom has traditionally been governed by homegrown organised criminal groups involved in a multitude of illegitimate businesses. Criminal enterprises come from a variety of different ethnic backgrounds finding their origin in the UK, the most dominant of them still being the White British groups.

The whole of the UK is said to host some 7,500 different organised criminal groups that cost the country £100 million a day in crime and lost revenues.

== British organised crime in other countries ==
In 1978, a century-old extradition treaty between the United Kingdom and Spain expired. By the time the treaty was replaced in 1985, the Costa del Sol on Spain's southern coast had become home to British expatriate criminals and fugitives, giving rise to the term "Costa del Crime". In 2006, Operation Captura, a multi-agency operation to detain criminals wanted by UK law enforcement on the run in Spain, was launched. By June 2019, 96 fugitives had been listed. All but ten had been captured by February 2020.

British, and especially Liverpudlian, drug traffickers have been operating in the Netherlands since as early as the 1980s. Following three murders in English-speaking drug circles in Amsterdam, police set up a team to investigate the scene in July 1992. The investigation revealed a network of approximately 150 predominantly English drug dealers operating in the city, trafficking cocaine, hashish and synthetic drugs sourced from Colombian and Dutch wholesalers to the UK, as well as Scandinavia, Australia and the US. In addition to the Netherlands' position as a logistical hub for drug trafficking, the country has also provided refuge for British fugitives. Reasons for this include established criminal networks, lack of language barrier and cultural similarities with the UK.

In the 1990s, British criminals and fugitives began operating in Thailand. An inexpensive country where fraudulent visas and travel documents are easily available, and police corruption is rife, Thailand provides British expatriates involved in the counterfeit goods trade a criminal endeavor relatively free from risk. British nationals have also been involved in the drug trade and money laundering in the country.

== British crime firms ==
English and Scottish crime groups, as well as Irish gangs and those of Turkish Cypriot descent (such as the Arif family) find their origin in tough, impoverished white working class neighbourhoods. They are largely family-run organised criminal gangs involved in many illegal activities in their respective areas. Even with the influx of foreign gangsters as well as with the rise of homegrown gangs consisting of minorities, white British groups are still the major concern for law enforcement and are active in the major British urban centres.

=== London crime families ===
London's crime families were traditionally centred in the East End of London, the infamous Kray twins being the most notable. They were identical twin brothers and organised crime figures who operated in the late 1950s to 1967. With their gang, known as the Firm, the Kray twins were involved in murder, armed robbery, arson, protection rackets, gambling, and assaults. At their peak in the 1960s, they gained a certain measure of celebrity status by mixing with prominent members of London society, being photographed by David Bailey, and being interviewed on television. South London was controlled at that time by the Richardson Gang, who were seen as direct rivals to the Kray Twins. Also known as the "Torture Gang", they had a reputation as some of London's most sadistic gangsters. Their alleged specialities included pulling teeth out using pliers, cutting off toes using bolt cutters, and nailing victims to floors using six-inch nails.

Due to the restructuring of the East End, and the continued influx of migrants to the area, traditional Cockney families have moved to South London, parts of North London (mainly Islington), and the counties surrounding London (such as Essex and Kent). Working-class neighbourhoods are often still home to family-based crime groups involved in drug trafficking, extortion, prostitution, armed robbery, contract killing, money laundering, counterfeiting and kidnapping. Some of the more notorious South London crime families include the 'Brindles' and the 'Walkers', while the Arifs are the most notorious crime family from London's south-eastern neighbourhoods.

The Hunt Crime Syndicate, otherwise known as the Canning Town Cartel, led by David Hunt is one of the biggest London crime firms. Hunt has been described by Metropolitan Police sources as being "too big to bring down" and runs an extensive criminal empire that has so far evaded significant penetration from law enforcement. The syndicate is linked to violence, fraud, prostitution, money laundering and murder. In 2016 details of a plot to assassinate three police officers who were investigating Hunt were revealed in full detail in an episode of BBC's Panorama. For a £1 million contract, Hunt had summoned Yardie hitman Carl 'The Dread' Robinson to a boat in Marbella and instructed him to kill the officers. Despite the detectives being tipped off there was a contract against them, their superiors, instead of investigating this, suspended the three officers and investigated them for corruption. They were later cleared of any wrongdoing.

Another well-known London crime family is the Clerkenwell crime syndicate in Islington, also known as the 'Adams family'. They are allegedly one of the most powerful in the United Kingdom. Media reports have credited them with a wealth of up to £200 million. During the 1980s, Terence "Terry" George Adams formed the syndicate with his brothers Thomas "Tommy" Sean Adams and Patrick "Patsy" Daniel John Adams as its financier and enforcer, respectively. The brothers were born to Irish parents, part of a large family of 11 children who grew up in Barnsbury, Islington.

=== Liverpudlian mafia ===
The Liverpudlian mafia is an informal category of drug trafficking cartels based in the city of Liverpool. In the late 1970s, crime boss Tommy “Tacker” Comerford formed Britain’s first cartel, which would come to be known as the "Liverpool Mafia", a group of white, middle-aged former armed robbers who, using corrupt port officials and protected by corrupt police, smuggled major quantities of amphetamine, cannabis, cocaine, heroin and LSD through the Liverpool docks. The Liverpool mafia gained strength by brokering a strategic alliance with young black gangs following the 1981 Toxteth riots, and became the richest crime group in the United Kingdom. The cartel protected its power base by forging close links to the IRA and, in particular, a contract-killing outfit called “The Cleaners”, a group of paramilitaries believed to be responsible for more than 20 drug-related assassinations around Liverpool.

The Liverpool mafia has had several powerful groups over the years, some of which have worked together, or fought over control of the cartel at different times. Notable figures include Curtis Warren, John Haase, the Fitzgibbons, the Huyton Firm, the Clarkes and Colin “Smigger” Smith. Curtis Warren, formerly Interpols Target Number One, became one of the biggest drug lords in Europe, flooding the continent with drugs. Colin Smith, who had an estimated personal fortune of over £200 million, was executed at close range with a pump action shotgun. His assassination was believed by police to be the first hit sanctioned by the Colombian Cartels on UK soil. It was also reported his death was ordered by various top Liverpool gangsters who had discussed killing Smith and taking over his business.

Organised crime and drug trafficking in the city is now largely controlled by a secretive cartel known as the Huyton Firm, also known as the Cantril Farm Cartel, formed in the 1990s and run by two brothers from the Huyton area of Liverpool. The gang has flooded the UK with cocaine and has been responsible for serious violence across Liverpool. They are internationally active and present in the same circles as Europe's significant criminal factions from Ireland, Russia and North Africa. The National Crime Agency, Britain's version of the FBI, have been trying to convict them for over 20 years. A senior Merseyside Police detective said that the brothers operated on a different level to mainstream Merseyside criminals. In 2002 a young man named Christopher “Buster” Brady from Liverpool city centre went to work for the gang in southern Spain. Later that same year, his remains washed up on a gravel beach near Benalmadena. He had been tortured, suffocated and had his lower legs amputated. The man is rumoured to have fallen foul of enforcers who worked for the Cantril Farm cartel.

In contrast to London's crime families, Liverpool crime groups are less territorial and more internationally active. The trafficking of cocaine and heroin to the British mainland as well as to countries like Spain, Portugal and the Netherlands is the main source of income for Scouse crime groups. Weapon trafficking and contract killing are activities of choice as well. Liverpudlian crime groups have forged close links with Irish criminal syndicates, as well as the Real IRA.

The Liverpool gangs tend to be more entrepreneurial instead of territorial, where different factions will often choose to work together in several criminal activities, but will also come into conflict with each other when it comes to more localised control over organised crime. While the Liverpool mafia used to refer to the White British crime families and cartels active in the city, it has grown to include the several powerful gangs active in the Liverpudlian Black community of Toxteth. When a strategic alliance was made between several white crime families and a number of Toxteth-based gangs dubbed the Black Caucus, a number of black gangs, including one headed by Curtis Warren, grew into power and moved up from street-level crime towards the organised criminal activities the white gangs were active in and dominated.

Liverpudlian organised crime 'firms' operate on a national and international level. This mainly focuses around the drug trade but also other forms of criminality. Crime groups from Liverpool are well known for trafficking drugs in the Netherlands and it has also been suggested that distribution networks for illicit drugs within Ireland, the UK, and even allegedly some Mediterranean holiday resorts, are today controlled by various Liverpool gangs, in places such as Marbella and Ibiza.

=== Glasgow crime families ===
In analogy with London, the city of Glasgow has been home to Scottish crime families involved in drug trafficking, weapon trafficking, extortion, kidnapping, scrap dealing and murder. The syndicates of Arthur Thompson or Thomas McGraw are prime examples of Glasgow crime clans. The nature of gangs in Glasgow also has a sectarian influence imported from Ireland. Glasgow's crime families are often involved in violent feuds, as with the vendetta between the Daniel clan and the Lyons Crime Family.

==== Other examples ====
White British crime families operate in many other cities in the United Kingdom as well, other known centres being Newcastle upon Tyne, Nottingham and Manchester. Firms outside of the more well-known London, Liverpool and Glasgow areas include the Noonans of Manchester or the Sayers in Newcastle.

Black British street gangs, such as the Tottenham Mandem and the Cheetham Hillbillies, are generally not described as being part of the traditional British crime firms, which is more associated with the White British crime families from the working class districts. Black British street gangs are nevertheless an active part of the British underworld and may have connections to the White firms, the Adams crime family as an example.

== Organised crime groups based in the United Kingdom (past and present) ==
- Huyton Firm
- Hellbanianz
- Lyons Crime Family
- Clerkenwell crime syndicate
- The Hunt syndicate
- The Kray Twins
- The Richardson Gang
- Curtis Warren Cartel
- McGraw firm
- Noonan firm
- Arif family
- Peaky Blinders
- Cheetham Hillbillies
- Woolwich Boys
- The Whitney Gang
- John Haase firm
- The Fitzgibbons
- The Clarkes
- Kenneth Noye firm
- The Syndicate
- Birmingham Boys
- Charles Sabini Gang
- Elephant and Castle Mob
- The White Family
- Billy Hill Firm
- Jack "Spot" Comer's Gang
- Scuttlers
- Mohocks

== See also ==
- Gangs in the United Kingdom
- Triads in the United Kingdom
