= Gangs in Liverpool =

Organised crime in Liverpool, UK

Gangs in Liverpool have been in existence since the early-19th century. There were also various sectarian 'political' gangs based in and around the city during this period. During the 1960s and 1970s, crime in Liverpool mainly focused on theft and armed-robbery. In the late 1970s, drugs became the new and most profitable way for gangs to earn money and made local criminals very wealthy in a short space of time. Liverpool's modern organised crime centres mainly on the drug trade. Merseyside police have reported in 2023 that as many as 120 gangs are operating around Merseyside.

== History ==
=== 1950–1970 ===
In the 1950s and 1960s, organised crime in Liverpool still centred on more traditional forms of crime, such as armed-robbery. Organised crime was contested by certain local families. These families would fight over disputes and territory, such as the ownership of pubs and clubs, but would also work together at times. This could have been in the form of a heist or robbery on the Liverpool docks, which became a place for local criminals to steal and then fence stolen goods.

==== Tommy Comerford ====
In 1969, career criminal Tommy "Tacker" Comerford was part of a gang of robbers from the north of Liverpool who spent a bank holiday weekend tunneling into a branch of the District Bank on Water Street in Liverpool city centre, using a thermal lance to open the safe and stealing over £140,000 in cash and £20,000 in property, over a million pounds in today's currency. After his release from prison several years later, Comerford abandoned robbery and became involved in the illegal drug trade. In the early 1980s, he was one of the first Liverpudlians to become involved in international drug trafficking.

=== 1980s ===
In the early 1980s, Liverpool was tagged by the media as 'Smack City' or 'Skag City' after it experienced an explosion in gang crime and heroin abuse, especially within the city's more deprived areas. At the same time, several criminal gangs began developing into successful drug traffickers, including the Liverpool Mafia, which was the first such cartel to develop in the UK. As drugs became increasingly valuable, large distribution networks were developed with cocaine producers in South America, including the Cali cartel. Over time, several Liverpool gangsters became increasingly wealthy, including Colin 'Smigger' Smith, who had an estimated fortune of £200m and Curtis 'Cocky' Warren, whose estimated wealth once saw him listed on the Sunday Times Rich List.

=== 1990s–2000s ===
==== Curtis Warren ====
During the 1990s, Curtis Warren became one of the biggest drug lords in the UK and Europe. He was once listed as the International Criminal Police Organisation Interpols ‘Target Number One’. Warren had an estimated fortune of £300 million. Forging direct links with the Cali Cartel, Warren and his gang flooded Europe with drugs.

Warren decided to leave Liverpool for the Netherlands after rival gangster David Ungi was shot dead, resulting in a spate of shootings during a local gang war. Warren continued running his empire from Holland but was eventually taken down by a dual effort by British and Dutch police. On 24 October 1996, Brigade Speciale Beveiligingsopdrachten raided Warren's villa, where they found guns and ammunition and a large amount of several illegal drugs.

Warren was sentenced to 12 years in the maximum security prison, Nieuw Vosseveld in Vught. During his time in prison, Warren killed fellow inmate Cemal Guclu, who was serving a 20 year sentence for murder and attempted murder. Guclu started yelling at Warren, before attacking him. A fight ensued, resulting in blows being exchanged and Warren punching and kicking Guclu in the head repeatedly. Guclu hit his head and fell into a coma which he never woke up from. Warren stated he stated he acted in “self defence” but was found guilty of manslaughter and sentenced to a further four years.

On 7 October 2009 Warren was found guilty of conspiracy to smuggle cannabis. He was sentenced on 3 December 2009 to 13 years imprisonment.

In November 2013, Warren was ordered to pay a £198m confiscation order, or face another ten years in jail. On 27 March 2014, it was reported that Warren had lost his appeal over his failure to pay the order, and so would remain in prison.

In November 2022, Warren was released after serving fourteen years in a maximum security prison.

==== 1990s Gang war ====
A report in the Observer newspaper written by journalist Peter Beaumont entitled Gangsters Put Liverpool Top of Gun League (28 May 1995), noted that turf wars had erupted within Liverpool. The high levels of violence in the city came to a head in 1996 when, following the shooting of gangster David Ungi, six shootings occurred in seven days, prompting Merseyside Police to become one of the first police forces in the country to openly carry weapons in the fight against gun crime. Official Home Office statistics revealed a total of 3,387 offences involving firearms had occurred in the Merseyside region during four years between 1997 and 2001. It was revealed that Liverpool was the main centre for organised crime in the North of England. In 1999, a prominent "turf war killing" occurred when Warren Selkirk was shot five times and a bag of dog excrement placed in his hand, while his children waited in a nearby car: Glaswegian Ian McAteer was convicted of the murder in 2001.

==== Crocky Crew vs Strand Gang ====
In 2007, the feud between two street gangs from Croxteth and Norris Green reached its peak with the murder of innocent 11 year old Rhys Jones.

In early 2004, what initially began as a petty rivalry among loosely affiliated antisocial youths and young men, spiralled into a gang war. At the Royal Oak pub on Muirhead Avenue, bordering West Derby and Norris Green, a masked gunman entered and repeatedly shot and killed Crocky Crew member Danny McDonald, setting off a chain of retaliatory shootings. Over the next four years investigators linked 17 shootings and 70 instances of criminal damage to the warring gangs, whose members brazenly roamed housing estates clad in body armour.

In 2006, Liam "Smigger" Smith, a notable Strand Gang member was murdered. Smith had been visiting a friend in prison and had a heated argument with Croxteth Crew inmate Ryan Lloyd. Within an hour Smith had been shot and killed as he left the prison gates.

Despite significant law enforcement efforts exemplified by the high-profile convictions of Mercer and six Croxteth Crew affiliates in December 2008, violence persisted, culminating in the June 2012 assassination of Joey Thompson, a respected Strand Gang member. This became the fourth murder linked to the feud.

Since January 2016 both areas have witnessed minimal gun violence incidents amidst broader regional efforts to combat escalating firearms offenses.

==== The Huyton Firm ====
Organised crime and drug trafficking in the city has been largely controlled by a secretive cartel known as Huyton Firm or ‘Cantril Farm Cartel’, founded in the 1990s and run by two brothers, Vincent and Francis Coggins, from the Huyton area of Liverpool. The brothers filled a power vacuum left behind after Curtis Warren and his gang were jailed and Colin Smith was murdered. They are internationally active. The National Crime Agency had been trying to convict them for over 20 years. The brothers were both finally arrested and sentenced. While Vincent Coggins was behind bars from 2020, his brother Francis Coggins remained on the run until he was arrested in June 2025 in the Netherlands and was extradited back to the UK. He was subsequently sentenced to 18 years in prison.

In 2009, the Huyton firm paid a local gang led by Kirk Bradley and Tony Downes to attack people associated with a trial at Liverpool Crown Court. Family homes were subjected to gun and hand grenade attacks, including an incident where a grenade was accidentally left outside Kenny Dalglish's Birkdale residence. Downes and Bradley are now serving life sentences for their roles in the 2009 terror campaign.

In 2010, the Huyton leaders dispatched a heavily armed gang to Amsterdam to assassinate a rival member of a Speke-based drug gang. Merseyside police tipped off Dutch authorities, leading to the arrest of the men by elite police and the discovery of a cache of military-standard weapons, including assault rifles with silencers. Following the June 10 arrests, the Serious Organised Crime Agency (SOCA) suggested that the police intervention likely thwarted a series of assassinations in Amsterdam, connected to the Liverpool gang war. The hit team were said to be targeting a former Liverpool boxer affiliated with the Speke firm.

In 2013, SOCA dealt a significant blow to the Huyton firm, seizing 400 kilograms of cocaine concealed in a shipment of Argentinean beef at Tilbury docks, valued at £90 million. The operation involved the replacement of the cocaine with dummy packages and the insertion of surveillance equipment.

In March 2017, a grenade exploded in the bedroom of barmaid Tina Knight. This incident exposed a drugs haul at a residence linked to the Huyton firm. Police discovered around 158kg of amphetamines worth £1.5 million and nearly 1kg of cocaine valued at around £100,000. The incident led to arrests in Merseyside and coordinated police raids in Spain, targeting the Liverpool crime group. Spanish police arrested 24 individuals, including senior Huyton firm members who were subsequently released on bail.

== Notable gangs ==
=== The Whitneys ===
The Whitney gang were a notorious family gang from the Anfield district of Liverpool. As of November 2011, all members of the Whitney gang have been jailed for 82 years. The last member to be extradited from Spain was Anthony "Tony" Whitney from his home in Dénia where he got mixed up in another smuggling plot, and was apprehended for smuggling 50,000 tablets of an ecstasy-type substance. The family spent years sat at the apex of a massive criminal network in Liverpool, stretching from their home in Anfield across much of the city.

=== Curtis Warren Cartel ===
Curtis Warren and his gang became one of the biggest cartels in the UK and Europe, being one of the first European groups to forge direct links with the Cali cartel. Warren, the head of the cartel, was formerly Interpol's Target One and was once listed on The Sunday Times Rich List with an estimated fortune of £300 million. He owned casinos in Spain; discos in Turkey; a vineyard in Bulgaria; land in the Gambia; and money stashed away in Swiss bank accounts.

Warren was blessed with a photographic memory. He never called contacts by their names, but code words; all of the Swiss bank account details were kept in his mind, never written down; he never kept accounts for his drug dealing business. The result was that he had an unlimited credit line from cartels in South America, and with cannabis traffickers in Turkey and Eastern Europe.

=== The Huyton Firm ===
The Huyton Firm was established in the 1990s and led by two brothers from the Huyton area of Liverpool, who came to prominence by filling a power vacuum left behind when Curtis Warren and his gang were finally jailed. The Huyton firm operates internationally and is connected to significant criminal factions in Europe, including those from Ireland, Russia, and North Africa. According to a senior Merseyside Police detective, the brothers operate on a different level compared to mainstream Merseyside criminals. Britain's National Crime Agency has been attempting to secure convictions against them for over two decades.

The leaders of the firm, who have always shunned publicity, moved to southern Spain in the late 90s, expanding their drug empire. Enforcers, recruited from Liverpool, were handpicked to work for the gang on the Costa Del Sol where they competed with rival crime groups from North Africa and Eastern Europe.

=== The Fitzgibbons ===
The Fitzgibbon brothers, Ian and Jason, along with their mother Christine, ran an international drugs empire from their home in Liverpool. The brothers rose to the top of the criminal underworld in Liverpool by using extreme violence. They were finally jailed in 2013, with Jason Fitzgibbon receiving a 16-year sentence and his brother Ian sentenced to 14 years and six months. The charges included a plot to smuggle £6 million worth of high-strength heroin into the country from Turkey. Ian Fitzgibbon faced additional charges related to a scheme to distribute 168,000 ecstasy tablets, potentially valued at over £800,000, on the streets of Merseyside. Their mother, Christine Fitzgibbon, aged 60, confessed to laundering drug money and received a two-year sentence.

=== The Clarkes ===
Peter Clarke, a former weapons instructor in the King's Regiment, and his brother Stephen Clarke, a security firm boss, were heads of a notorious Liverpool drugs gang, orchestrating shipments of cocaine and cannabis from Merseyside to Northern Ireland. The brothers, with access to a cache of weapons including guns, samurai swords, and machetes, were convicted in November 2013. Peter Clarke, admitted to organizing the cocaine conspiracy, while Stephen Clarke admitted to managing a network of cannabis farms.

Sentenced to over 26 years combined, they faced the forfeiture and destruction of body armor, drugs, and guns, but with only £600,000 of their £3.8 million fortune to be repaid. The arsenal uncovered at a lock-up in the Ainsdale area of Southport included a sawn-off shotgun, Glock pistol, Luger handgun, revolvers, ammunition, silencers, machetes, samurai swords, stun guns, and batons.

=== John Haase's Transit Mob ===
John Haase is a convicted drug baron who along with his nephew Paul Bennett, were involved in international and national drug trafficking along with other forms of organised crime. They are career criminals with convictions for bank robbery which they carried out with their firm known as ‘The Transit Mob’, and also drug smuggling. In 1996, Haase and Bennett were given a Royal Pardon 11 months into 18-year prison sentences for heroin smuggling, having provided information leading to the seizure of firearms. The Home Secretary, Michael Howard, was criticized for the decision, and in 2008 Haase and Bennett were convicted of having set up the weapons finds to earn them their release, and sentenced to 20 and 22 years in prison respectively.

Haase was released on licence in June 2019, and was quickly recruited as an enforcer for criminals to recover debts. On March 14 2020, a house was set on fire in the Whirlow area of Sheffield as part of "terror tactics" after the owners refused to pay an alleged debt of £280,000. A Range Rover on the driveway was ignited, causing flames to spread to the garage and subsequently to the house. Despite the occupants being away at the time, the fire caused extensive damage to the property. Haase, now 74, was given a 9 year prison sentence for the crime.

=== The Showers Brothers ===
Michael and Delroy Showers were two of the first drug lords to be established in the city of Liverpool. Michael famously flaunted his new-found wealth by driving around his childhood area of Toxteth in a white Rolls Royce and expensive suit. Michael Showers was jailed for 20 years in 1991 after attempting to negotiate a route for £2m worth of high-grade heroin to enter the UK. During the 1990s, his plot was thwarted by a police sting called "Operation Rain Man". The Toxteth Gangster was caught following the elaborate operation between British police and HM Customs and Excise and their counterparts on the Indian sub-continent led to the seizure of 12 kg of the drug. In 2010, he was arrested in Turkey by a joint operation by the Turkish Police and the British Serious Organised Crime Agency (SOCA), the drugs baron was reprimanded after being linked to alleged cannabis smuggling.

Delroy Showers was jailed in 2009 over a plot to smuggle just over £1m worth of amphetamines into Denmark from the Netherlands. His 14 year sentence was thought to have begun in Randers, Denmark, but in 2014 the Foreign Office confirmed he was moved back to the UK to finish his jail term.

== Tragedies ==
In August 2007, the ongoing war between two rival gangs the ‘Crocky Crew’ and ‘Strand Gang’, caused nationwide outrage when innocent 11-year-old Rhys Jones was shot in the back as he walked home from football practice and died in his mother's arms in the car park of the Fir Tree pub in the Croxteth district of Liverpool. On 16 December 2008, Sean Mercer was convicted of the murder and ordered to serve a minimum tariff of 22 years by trial judge Mr Justice Irwin.

Ashley Dale, a municipal worker, was murdered in Old Swan, Liverpool on 21 August 2022. The murder happened during a planned attack against her boyfriend, Lee Harrison, who had become embroiled in a conflict with a rival gang. Using a Skorpion submachine gun, 41-year-old James Witham broke into Dale's home and shot her in the stomach, killing her while she stood by the back door. Witham, alongside Joseph Peers, Niall Barry, and Sean Zeisz, were convicted on charges related to murdering Dale, conspiring to murder Harrison, and possessing illegal firearms and ammunition. Witham was sentenced to a minimum of 43 years in prison, while the prison sentences for Peers, Zeisz, and Barry were 41, 42, and 47 years, respectively.

On 22 August 2022, Olivia Pratt-Korbel, a nine-year-old girl, was shot by a masked gunman, and was pronounced dead the same day at the city's Alder Hey Children's Hospital. The attack took place at the doorstep of Pratt-Korbel's family home in Dovecot; the intended target of the attack was 35-year-old gang member Joseph Nee, who had criminal convictions for drug dealing and burglary. During the attack, Pratt-Korbel was with her mother. A shot by the gunman passed through her mother's wrist and Pratt-Korbel's chest. On 3 April 2023, Thomas Cashman was sentenced to life imprisonment for Olivia's murder, as well as for the attempted murder of his intended target; he was ordered to serve a minimum of 42 years before being considered for parole. He was sentenced to 10 years for the wounding of Olivia's mother, and received two 18 year sentences for both counts of possession of a firearm with intent to endanger life, with all of the sentences to run concurrently.

On 24 December 2022, Elle Edwards was fatally shot and killed inside a pub in Wallasey, Merseyside. Merseyside Police said that officers were called to the Lighthouse Inn just after 11:50 p.m. following reports of gunshots. A gunman fired several shots towards the front entrance of the pub, which was packed with mostly young people at the time, from a military grade submachine gun. The attack was an attempt to kill Jake Duffy and Kieran Salkeld, two men from a rival gang. Both were seriously injured in the shooting. Elle Edwards, was taken to Arrowe Park Hospital after she suffered a serious gunshot injury to her head, but died shortly after. Four other men were also taken to hospital with gunshot wounds, one of whom, a 28-year-old man, was in critical condition. Connor Chapman was convicted of her murder and seven other counts, including firearm charges and attempted murder.

== International operations ==
Liverpudlian organised crime 'firms' operate on an international level. This mainly focuses around the drug trade but also other forms of criminality. Crime groups from Liverpool are well known for trafficking drugs in the Netherlands and it has also been suggested that distribution networks for illicit drugs within Ireland, the UK, and even allegedly some Mediterranean holiday resorts, are today controlled by various Liverpool gangs, in places such as Marbella and Ibiza.

== See also ==
- Crime in Liverpool
