= Vinz =

Vinz may refer to:

- Vinz (singer), part of the duo Nico & Vinz, earlier known as Envy
- Ryan Vinz, American video technician
- Vinz (rapper), Albanian rapper
- Vinz Clortho, the Keymaster of Gozer, fictional character in the film Ghostbusters

== See also ==
- Purim Vinz, a Jewish anniversary commemorating the return, in 1616, of the Jews to Frankfurt after a group led by Vincenz Fettmilch organized a pogrom and expelled them out of the city
