= Tommy Comerford =

English gangster (1932–2003)

- Born: Thomas Anthony Comerford
- Died: October 2003 (aged 70–71); Liverpool, England
- Other names: "Tacker", "Top Cat"
- Occupation: Crime boss
- Years active: 1960s–1990s
- Convictions: Burglary (1970); Drug trafficking (1985); Drug trafficking (1996)
- Penalty: 10 years' imprisonment (1970); 14 years' imprisonment (1985); 10 years' imprisonment (1996)

Thomas Anthony "Tommy" Comerford (died October 2003), also known as "Tacker" and "Top Cat", was an English gangster. A longtime figure in Liverpool's underworld, Comerford dominated criminal activity in the Merseyside area, spending over 34 years in prison during the course of his criminal career. He was involved in narcotics, and was one of the first criminals to establish an international drug trafficking network in England.

== Criminal career ==
Comerford worked as a truck driver on the Liverpool docks and was also a petty criminal and thief before becoming involved in armed robbery. He was reportedly responsible for stopping the Kray twins from moving in on the city's rackets in the 1960s.

In August 1969, Comerford was part of a gang of robbers from the north of Liverpool who spent a bank holiday weekend tunnelling into a branch of the District Bank on Water Street in Liverpool city centre, using a thermal lance to open the safe and stealing over £140,000 in cash and £20,000 in property. Comerford allegedly gave a cigarette case which had been stolen during the break-in to his barrister, who later offered a senior police detective a cigarette from the case during a boxing match at the Britannia Adelphi Hotel. The detective reportedly recognised the case as being stolen from the bank, leading to the arrests of Comerford and the other robbers. In December 1970, Comerford was convicted of burglary and sentenced to ten years in prison. This was his second criminal conviction.

After his release from prison several years later, Comerford abandoned robbery and became involved in the drug trade. In the late 1970s, he formed the "Liverpool Mafia", a group of white, middle-aged former armed robbers who, using corrupt port officials and protected by corrupt police, smuggled major quantities of amphetamine, cannabis, cocaine, heroin and LSD through the Liverpool docks. The "Liverpool Mafia" gained strength by brokering a strategic alliance with young black gangs following the 1981 Toxteth riots, and became the richest crime group in the United Kingdom. Comerford recruited a gang, which included four dockers, to collect a consignment of cannabis from North Africa. The plot was discovered by the Merseyside Police drug squad, however, and he and his associates were arrested following a stakeout. Comerford was sentenced to seven years' imprisonment at Liverpool Crown Court, although his sentence was reduced to four years' upon appeal.

As one of the first Liverpudlians to become involved in international drug trafficking, Comerford was among Liverpool's leading criminals in the 1980s. Described as "a larger-than-life Scotland Road character", he lived an extravagant lifestyle, wearing expensive suits and watches, and regularly attending boxing dinners and the Grand National. Despite his wealth, Comerford was granted a council flat on Lee Vale Road and regular benefit payments from the Department of Health and Social Security (DHSS). At the same time, he was living in a luxury bungalow on Station Road in Gateacre. In 1983, he and his wife flew to New York to embark on a winter cruise onboard the Queen Elizabeth 2, a holiday costing almost £5,000. In the summer of 1984, Comerford and his associates came under heavy police surveillance as part of an investigation known as Operation Eagle. One of his senior dealers began cooperating with authorities after he was arrested following a police chase from Liverpool city centre into Anfield, and he led police to Comerford's council flat, which was used as the headquarters of his drug enterprise. It emerged that Comerford had used the flat to supply U.S. military personnel stationed in West Germany with vast quantities of drugs. He and an accomplice were arrested in possession of a half-kilogram of heroin as they arrived at Heathrow Airport from Stuttgart, and Comerford was sentenced to fourteen years in prison at the Old Bailey the following year.

In the mid-1990s, HM Customs and Excise launched another covert operation against Comerford after receiving intelligence that he was involved in a new drug conspiracy. He was arrested in November 1995 during a sting operation at the Hyatt Regency Birmingham in connection with a ten-kilogram cocaine shipment from Ecuador, valued at £1 million, which was seized at Felixstowe. He was given a ten-year prison sentence in November 1996.

Comerford was charged with possession with intent to supply in March 2003 after police stopped and searched a car he was travelling in with a group of friends, finding a stash of heroin valued at approximately £10,000. Although Comerford's solicitor Robert Broudie claimed that his client was unaware of the drugs in the car, the case was ultimately never settled as Comerford died before he could stand trial.

== Death ==
Comerford was diagnosed with liver cancer in August 2003, and he succumbed to the disease in October that year at the age of 70. He was buried at a small, low-key funeral attended by half a dozen friends and family.

A month after his death, police were granted £25,000 seized from his home following his March 2003 arrest. However, this was contested by family members who requested to have the money returned. Under the terms of the Proceeds of Crime Act, police were eventually granted a Forfeiture Order by the Liverpool Magistrates Court, following an investigation by the Money Laundering Investigation Team. The family withdrew their claim.

Comerford is considered one of Liverpool's first crime bosses and the predecessor to later drug kingpins of the city such as John Haase and Curtis Warren. Comerford's former solicitor Rex Makin said of him: "He was one the most charming criminals I have ever known. His career as a criminal on Merseyside was more colourful than any other in the last half century".
