= John Haase =

John Haase may refer to:

- John Haase (author)
- John Haase (criminal)
