= Kosovo Albanians =

Ethnic group in the Balkans

Kosovo Albanians Shqiptarët e Kosovës
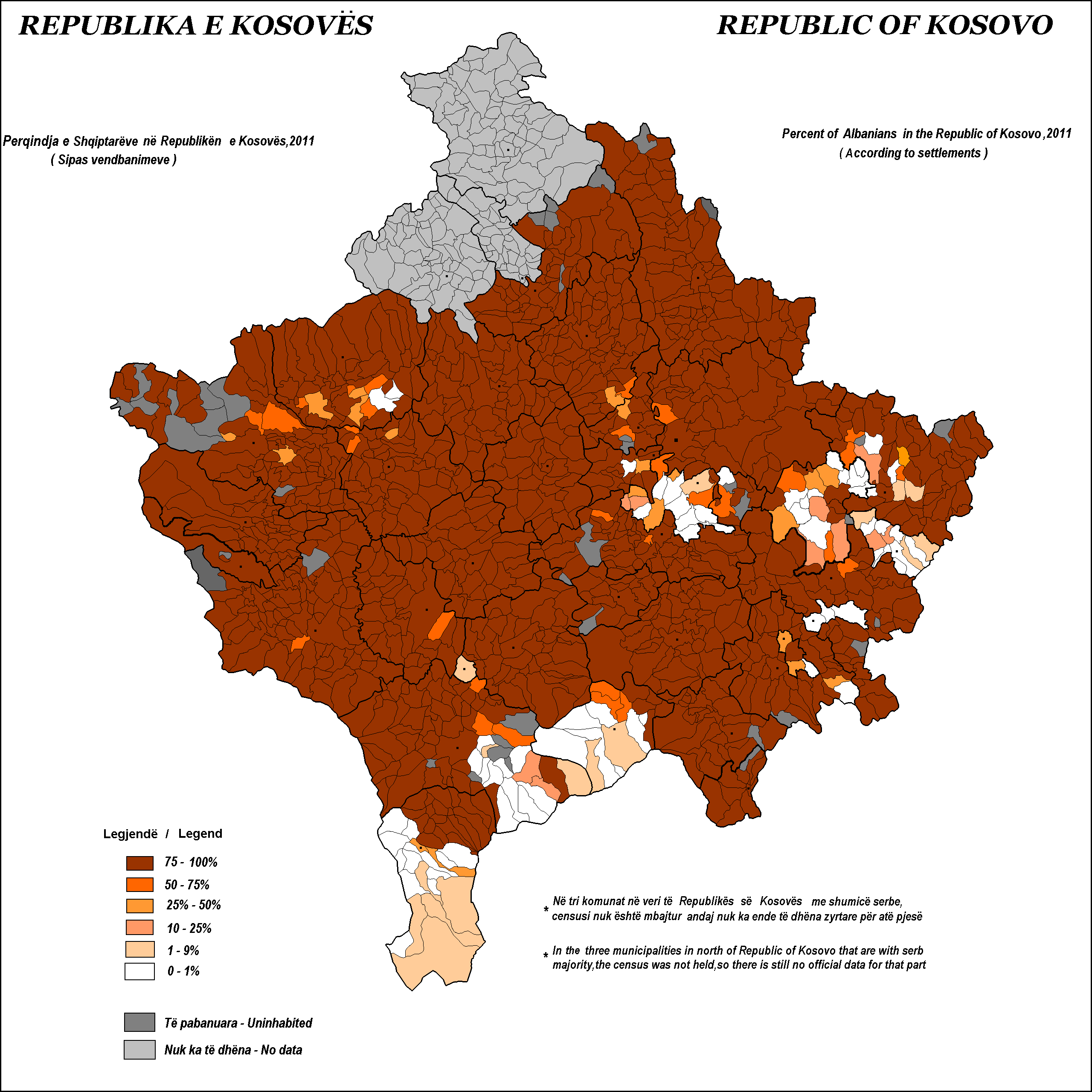
- Albanians in Kosovo (2011 census)

Regions with significant populations
- Kosovo 1,454,963 (2024)

Other regions
- Turkey: 600,000+
- Germany: 300,000
- Switzerland: 200,000
- Italy: 43,763
- France: 40,000
- Netherlands: 8,500
- Canada: 2,870

Languages
- Albanian (Gheg Albanian)

Religion
- Predominantly Sunni Islam; Christian minority (Catholic · Protestant)

Related ethnic groups
- Albanians

The Albanians of Kosovo (Albanian: Shqiptarët e Kosovës, pronounced [ʃcipˈtaɾət ɛ kɔˈsɔvəs]), commonly also called Kosovo Albanians, Kosovan Albanians or Kosovar Albanians, are an ethnic Albanian population native to Kosovo and constitute the country's largest ethnic group. They belong to the Gheg dialectal sub-group of Albanians, because they speak Gheg Albanian. (Note: more specifically the Northwestern and Northeastern Gheg variants) According to the 2024 national census by the ASK, Albanians comprise 91.8% of the population in Kosovo.

== History ==
=== Pre-7th century ===
Toponymical evidence suggests that Albanian was spoken in western and eastern Kosovo and the Niš region before the Migration Period. In this era, Albanian in Kosovo was in linguistic contact with Eastern Romance which was presumably spoken in contemporary eastern Serbia and Macedonia.

=== Middle Ages ===
Between 1246 and 1255, Stefan Uroš I had reported Albanian toponyms in the Drenica valley. A chrysobull of the Serbian Tsar Stefan Dušan that was given to the Monastery of Saint Mihail and Gavril in Prizren between the years of 1348–1353 states the presence of Albanians in the Plains of Dukagjin, the vicinity of Prizren and in the villages of Drenica. During Stefan Dušan's reign, Albanian Catholics in Kosovo were forcibly converted into Orthodoxy, many others were expelled, and Catholic churches were converted into Orthodox ones.

In the 14th century in two chrysobulls or decrees by Serbian rulers, villages of Albanians alongside Vlachs are cited in the first as being between the White Drin and Lim rivers (1330), and in the second (1348) a total of nine Albanian villages are cited within the vicinity of Prizren.

The Albanian villages Ujmir and Gjonaj are mentioned in Serbian scriptures from the 1300s. In Gjonaj stands possibly one of the oldest Catholic churches in Kosovo. Gjonaj is also believed to be the birthplace of Pjetër Bogdani. Other Albanian villages mentioned from the 14th and 15th centuries are Planeje, Zym, Gorozhub, Milaj, Kojushe, Batushe, Mazrek, and Voksh. Based on the anthroponomy in the Ottoman registers from 1452–53, Selami Pulaha considers that the Has region in Kosovo was inhabited by a Christian Albanian population. Villages that were identified in the defters and still exist today include Mazrek, Kojushe, Gorozhub, Zym, Zhur, Milaj, and Planeje. In the 1485 defter, which covered the Gjakova region of Western Kosovo, half of the villages had Albanian names or a mixture of Slavic-Albanian names.

The Ottomans defters of 15th and 16th century also recorded new arrivals into Kosovo and abandoned places. Nothing indicates the area was massively depopulated during this period nor massively settled by another population from outside. Ottoman records from the 15th century show western Kosovo had a large native Albanian population. Further research indicates the towns in Eastern Kosovo had a large Muslim Albanian population prior to the Austrian-Ottoman wars of 1690 and that the towns lost their population considerably due to the wars. During the 18th century and onwards there were also movements of people within these Albanian inhabited territories (Nish, Macedonia, Kosovo, Albania).

Kosovo was part of the Ottoman Empire from 1455 to 1912, at first as part of the eyalet of Rumelia, and from 1864 as a separate province (vilayet). During this time, Islam was introduced to the population. Today, Sunni Islam is the predominant religion of Kosovo Albanians.

The Ottoman term Arnavudluk (آرناوودلق) meaning Albania was used in Ottoman state records for areas such as southern Serbia and Kosovo. Evliya Çelebi (1611–1682) in his travels within the region during 1660 referred to the western and central part of what is today Kosovo as Arnavudluk and described the town of Vushtrri's inhabitants as having knowledge of Albanian or Turkish with few speakers of Slavic languages.

=== Modern period ===
==== 19th century ====
A large number of Albanians alongside smaller numbers of urban Turks (with some being of Albanian origin) were expelled and/or fled from what is now contemporary southern Serbia (Toplica and Morava regions) during the Serbian–Ottoman War (1876–78). Many settled in Kosovo, where they and their descendants are known as muhaxhir, also muhaxher ("exiles", from Arabic 'muhajir'), and some bear the surname Muhaxhiri/Muhaxheri or most others the village name of origin. During the late Ottoman period, ethno-national Albanian identity as expressed in contemporary times did not exist amongst the wider Kosovo Albanian-speaking population. Instead collective identities were based upon either socio-professional, socio-economic, regional, or religious identities and sometimes relations between Muslim and Christian Albanians were tense.

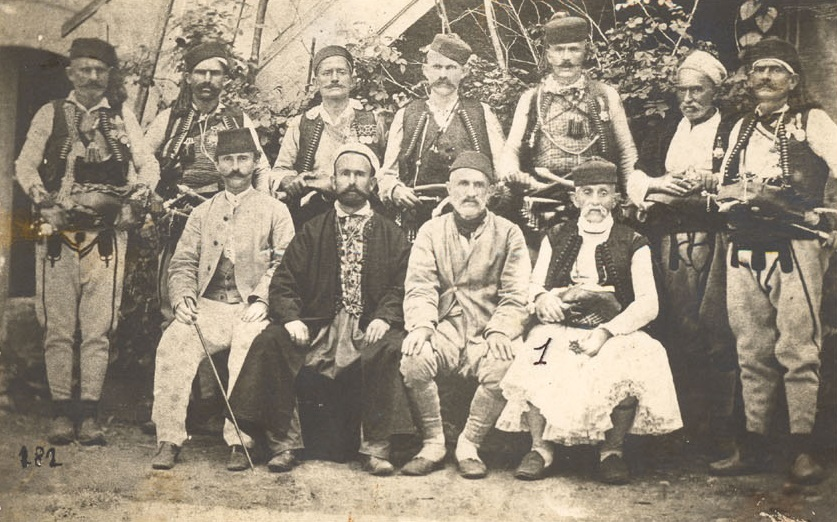
League of Prizren (1878)

As a reaction against the Congress of Berlin, which had given some Albanian-populated territories to Serbia and Montenegro, Albanians, mostly from Kosovo, formed the League of Prizren in Prizren in June 1878 with the goal of uniting Albanian inhabitants in the Ottoman Empire into a single vilayet. The Ottoman state briefly supported the league's claims viewing Albanian nationalism as possibly preventing further territorial losses to newly independent Balkan states. Failing to win their claims on a diplomatic level, Albanians embarked on the route of military conflict with their Balkan neighbors. After three years of war, the Albanians were defeated. Many of the leaders were executed and imprisoned or exiled.

In 1909-1910, an Albanian uprising spread from Pristina and lasted until the Ottoman Sultan's visit to Kosovo in June 1911 where he declared amnesty for the insurgents. At that time Serbs consisted about 25% of the whole Vilayet of Kosovo's overall population, and were opposing the Albanian aims along with Turks and other Slavs in Kosovo, which prevented the Albanian movements from establishing their rule over Kosovo.

==== 20th century ====
In 1912 during the Balkan Wars, most of eastern Kosovo was taken by the Kingdom of Serbia, while the Kingdom of Montenegro took western Kosovo, which a majority of its inhabitants call "the plateau of Dukagjin" (Rrafshi i Dukagjinit) and the Serbs call Metohija (Метохија), a Greek word meant for the landed dependencies of a monastery. Aside from many war crimes and atrocities committed by the Serbian Army on the Albanian population, colonist Serb families moved into Kosovo, while the Albanian population was decreased. As a result, the proportion of Albanians in Kosovo declined from 75 percent at the time of the invasion to slightly more than 65% percent by 1941.

The 1918–1929 period under the Kingdom of the Serbs, Croats and Slovenes was a time of persecution of the Kosovar Albanians. Kosovo was split into four counties—three being a part of official Serbia: Zvečan, Kosovo and southern Metohija; and one in Montenegro: northern Metohija. However, the new administration system since 26 April 1922 split Kosovo among three Regions in the Kingdom: Kosovo, Rascia and Zeta. In 1929 the Kingdom was transformed into the Kingdom of Yugoslavia. The territories of Kosovo were split among the Banate of Zeta, the Banate of Morava and the Banate of Vardar. The Kingdom lasted until the World War II Axis invasion of April 1941.

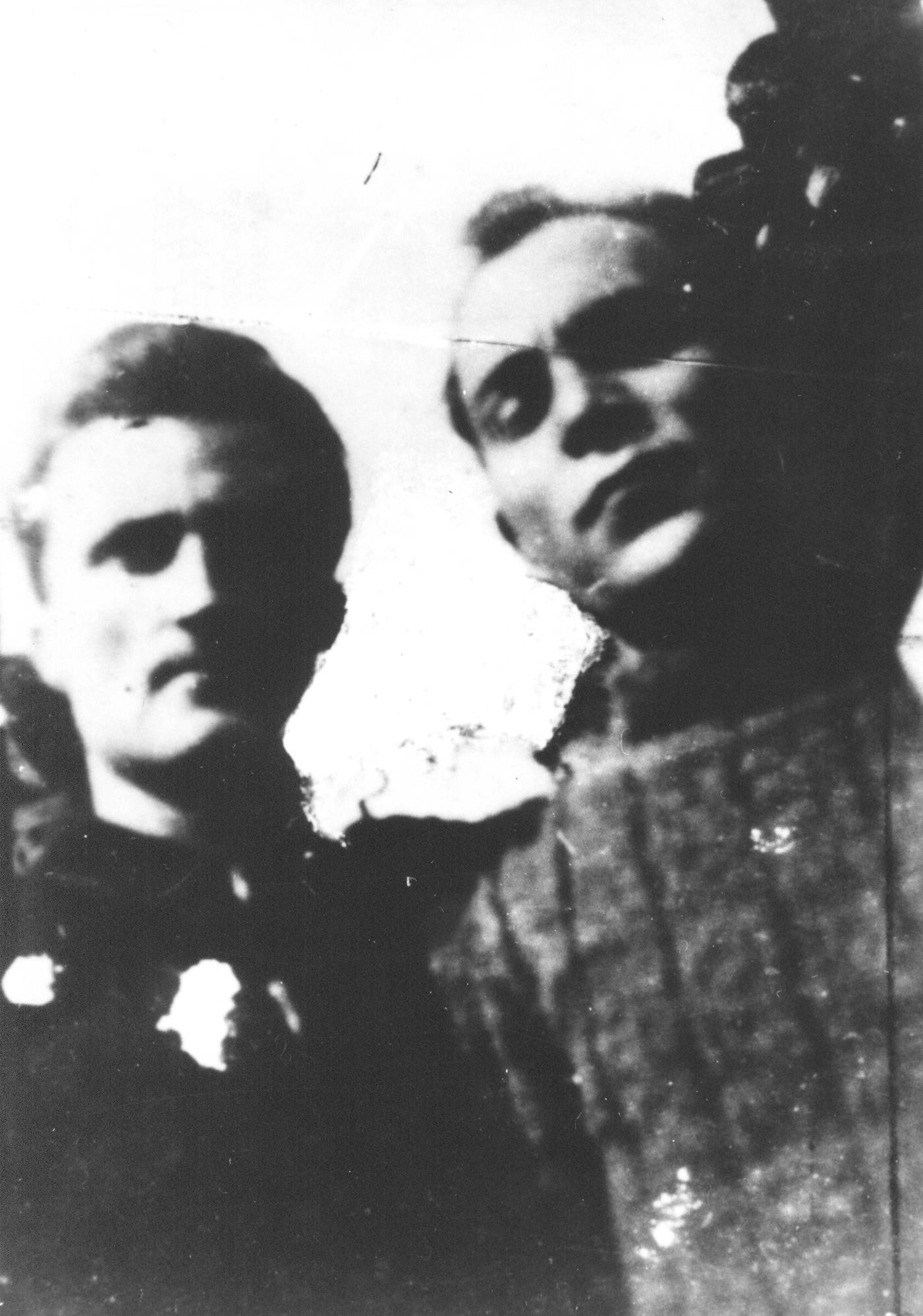
Ramiz Sadiku and Boro Vukmirović, People's Heroes of Yugoslavia and symbol of Serbian-Albanian friendship

After the Axis invasion, the greater part of Kosovo became a part of Italian-controlled Fascist Albania, and a smaller, Eastern part by the Axis allied Tsardom of Bulgaria and Nazi German-occupied Serbia. Since the Albanian Fascist political leadership had decided in the Conference of Bujan that Kosovo would remain a part of Albania they started expelling the Serbian and Montenegrin settlers "who had arrived in the 1920s and 1930s". Prior to the surrender of Fascist Italy in 1943, the German forces took over direct control of the region. After numerous Serbian and Yugoslav Partisans uprisings, Kosovo was liberated after 1944 with the help of the Albanian partisans of the Comintern, and became a province of Serbia within the Democratic Federal Yugoslavia.

The Province of Kosovo was formed in 1946 as an autonomous region to protect its regional Albanian majority within the People's Republic of Serbia as a member of the Federal People's Republic of Yugoslavia under the leadership of the former Partisan leader, Josip Broz Tito, with limited self-government. After Yugoslavia's name changed to the Socialist Federal Republic of Yugoslavia and Serbia's to the Socialist Republic of Serbia in 1963, the now-termed Autonomous Region of Kosovo and Metohija's status was equalized with that of Vojvodina; further constitutional amendments in 1968 elevated the autonomous provinces to constitutional elements of the federation while the term socialist was added and the term Metohija was removed from Kosovo. In the 1974 constitution, the Socialist Autonomous Province of Kosovo received higher powers, allowing it to have its own administration, assembly, and judiciary. It also received membership in the collective presidency and the federal parliament, in which it held veto power, though remaining as a Socialist Autonomous Region within the Socialist Republic of Serbia. Serbo-Croat and Albanian were defined official on the provincial level marking the two largest linguistic Kosovan groups: Serbs and Albanians.

In the 1970s, an Albanian nationalist movement pursued full recognition of the Province of Kosovo as another Republic within the Federation, while the most extreme elements aimed for full-scale independence. Tito's government dealt with the situation swiftly, but only giving it a temporary solution. In 1981, Kosovar Albanian students organised protests calling for Kosovo to become a republic within Yugoslavia or even union with Albania. Those protests were harshly contained by the centralist Yugoslav government.

Flag of Albanian minority in SFR Yugoslavia

In 1986, the Serbian Academy of Sciences and Arts (SANU) was working on a document, which later would be known as the SANU Memorandum. An unfinished edition was filtered to the press. In the essay, SANU portrayed the Serbian people as a victim and called for the revival of Serb nationalism, using both true and exaggerated facts for propaganda. During this time, Slobodan Milošević rose to power in the League of the Socialists of Serbia.

Soon afterwards, as approved by the Assembly in 1990, the autonomy of Kosovo was revoked, and the pre-1974 status reinstated. Milošević, however, did not remove Kosovo's seat from the Federal Presidency, but he installed his own supporters in that seat, so he could gain power in the Federal government. After Slovenia's secession from Yugoslavia in 1991, Milošević used the seat to obtain dominance over the Federal government, outvoting his opponents. Many Albanians organized a peaceful active resistance movement, following the job losses suffered by some of them, while other, more radical and nationalistic oriented Albanians, started violent purges of the non-Albanian residents of Kosovo.

On 2 July 1990, an unconstitutional ethnic Albanian parliament declared Kosovo an independent country, although this was not recognized by the Government since the ethnic Albanians refused to register themselves as legal citizens of Yugoslavia. In September of that year, the ethnic Albanian parliament, meeting in secrecy in the town of Kačanik, adopted the Constitution of the Republic of Kosova. A year later, the Parliament organized the 1991 Kosovan independence referendum, which was observed by international organisations, but the only country to recognize it was Albania. With an 87% turnout, 99.88% voted for Kosovo to be independent. The non-Albanian population, at the time comprising 10% of Kosovo's population, refused to vote since they considered the referendum to be illegal.

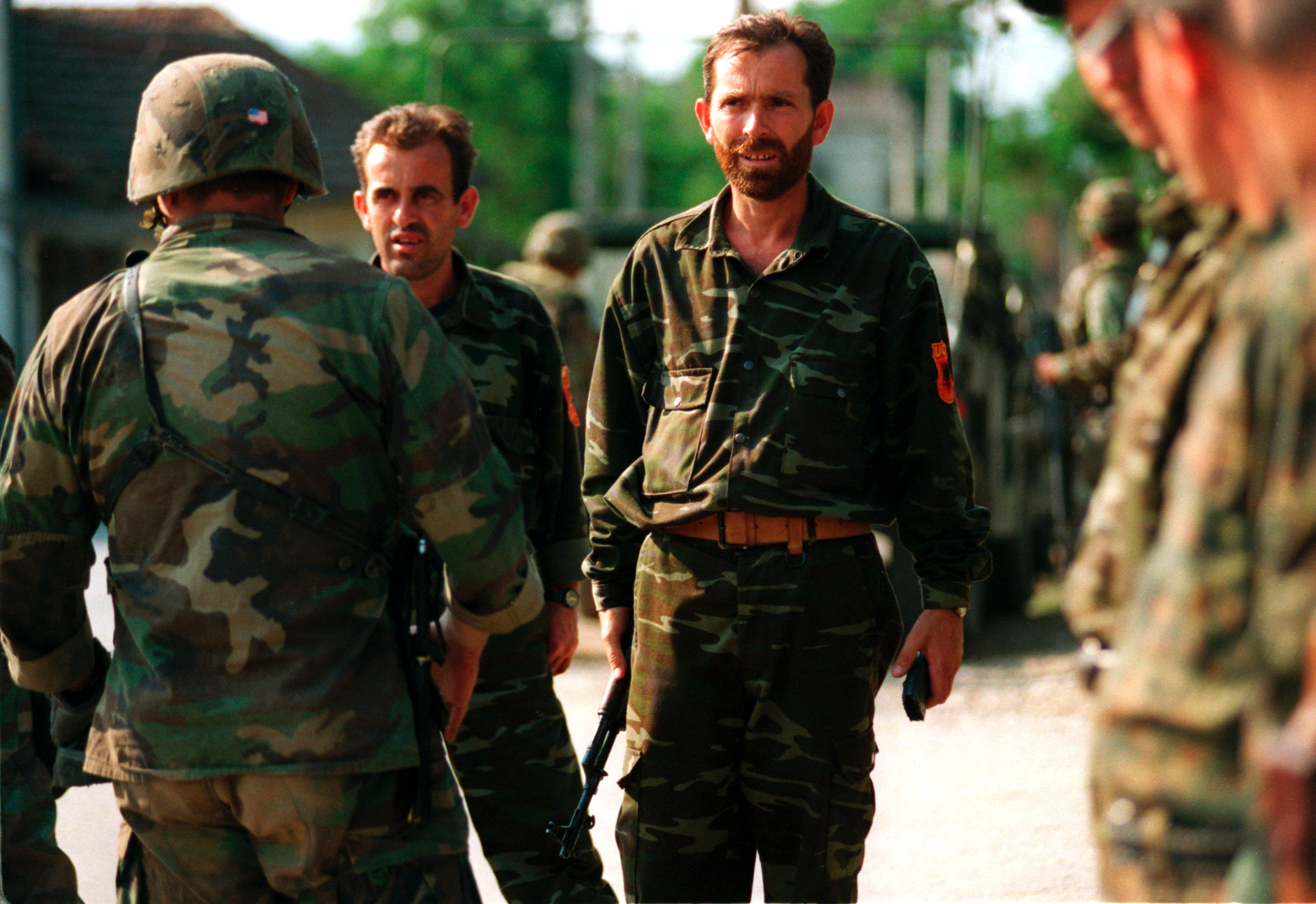
Kosovo Liberation Army handing over arms to U.S. forces, 30 June 1999

In 1992–1993, ethnic Albanians created the Kosovo Liberation Army (KLA). In 1995, the Dayton Agreement was signed in Dayton, Ohio. Finalized on 21 November 1995 and signed on 10 December 1995, the agreement ended the three-year-long Bosnian War. After the Bosnian War, the KLA began staging ambushes of Serb patrols as well as killing policemen, as they sought to capitalize on popular resentment among Kosovan Albanians against the Serbian regime.

From 1996 onwards, the KLA took responsibility for the attacks it committed. The KLA grew to a few hundred Albanians who attacked police stations and wounded many police officers from 1996–1997. Following the 1997 Albanian civil unrest, the KLA was enabled to acquire large amounts of weapons looted from Albanian armories. The KLA also received large funds from Albanian diaspora organizations.

The KLA-led campaign continued into January 1999 and was brought to the attention of the world media by the Račak massacre, the mass killing of about 45 Albanians (including 9 KLA insurgents) by Serbian security forces. An international conference was held in Rambouillet, France later that spring and resulted in a proposed peace agreement, called the Rambouillet Agreement, which was accepted by the ethnic Albanian side but rejected by the Yugoslav government. The failure of the talks at Rambouillet resulted in a NATO air campaign against the Federal Republic of Yugoslavia lasting from 24 March to 10 June when the Yugoslav authorities signed a military technical agreement.

==== 21st century ====
International negotiations began in 2006 to determine the final status of Kosovo, as envisaged under UN Security Council Resolution 1244, which ended the Kosovo conflict of 1999. While Serbia's continued sovereignty over Kosovo was recognised by much of the international community at the time, a clear majority of Kosovo's population preferred independence. The UN-backed talks, led by UN Special Envoy Martti Ahtisaari, began in February 2006. While progress was made on technical matters, both parties remained diametrically opposed on the question of status itself. In February 2007, Ahtisaari delivered a draft status settlement proposal to leaders in Belgrade and Pristina, the basis for a draft UN Security Council Resolution that proposes 'supervised independence' for the province.

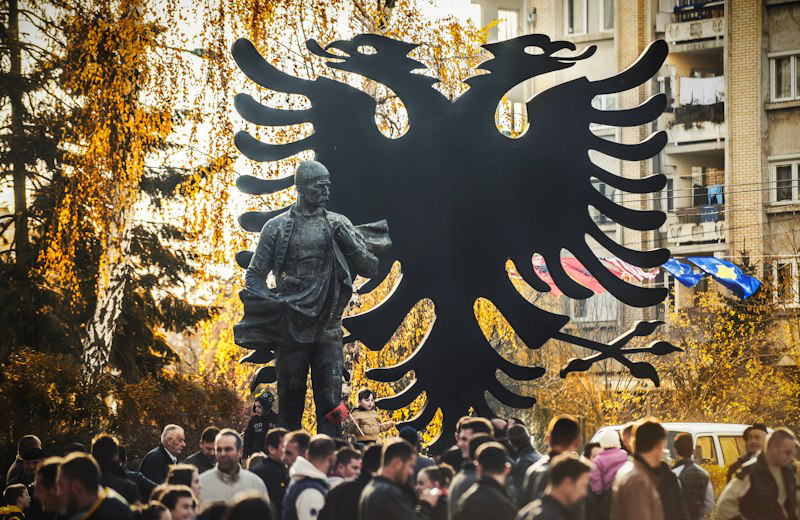
The Isa Boletini statue in the centre of Mitrovica, Kosovo inaugurated during the 100th anniversary of the independence of Albania

As of early July 2007 the draft resolution, which is backed by the United States, United Kingdom and other European members of the United Nations Security Council, had been rewritten four times to try to accommodate Russian concerns that such a resolution would undermine the principle of state sovereignty. Russia, which holds a veto in the Security Council as one of five permanent members, has stated that it will not support any resolution that is not acceptable to both Belgrade and Pristina. On 17 February 2008, the Assembly of Kosovo declared the Republic of Kosovo to be an independent and sovereign state. As of November 2023, more than 100 UN member states have recognised Kosovo as an independent country.

On 26 November 2019, an earthquake struck Albania. The Kosovo Albanian population reacted with sentiments of solidarity through fundraising initiatives and money, food, clothing and shelter donations. Volunteers and humanitarian aid in trucks, buses and hundreds of cars from Kosovo traveled to Albania to assist in the situation and people were involved in tasks such as the operation of mobile kitchens and gathering financial aid. Many Albanians in Kosovo have opened their homes to people displaced by the earthquake.

== Demographics ==
According to the 1991 Yugoslav census, boycotted by Albanians, there were 1,596,072 ethnic Albanians in Kosovo or 81.6% of population. By the estimation in the year 2000, there were between 1,584,000 and 1,733,600 Albanians in Kosovo or 88% of population; as of 2011, their population share is 92.93%.

Ethnic groups in Kosovo
Year	Albanians	Serbs	Others	Source and notes
1921	61%	33%	6%	
1931	58%	29%	13%	
1948	65%	26%	9%	ICTY
1953	65%	24%	10%	
1961	67%	23%	9%	
1971	73%	19%	7%	
1981	76%	16%	8%	
1991	80%	13%	7%	1991 Census
2000	87%	9%	4%	World Bank, OSCE
2007	92%	5%	3%	OSCE
2011	92.9%	1.5%	5.4%	2011 Census

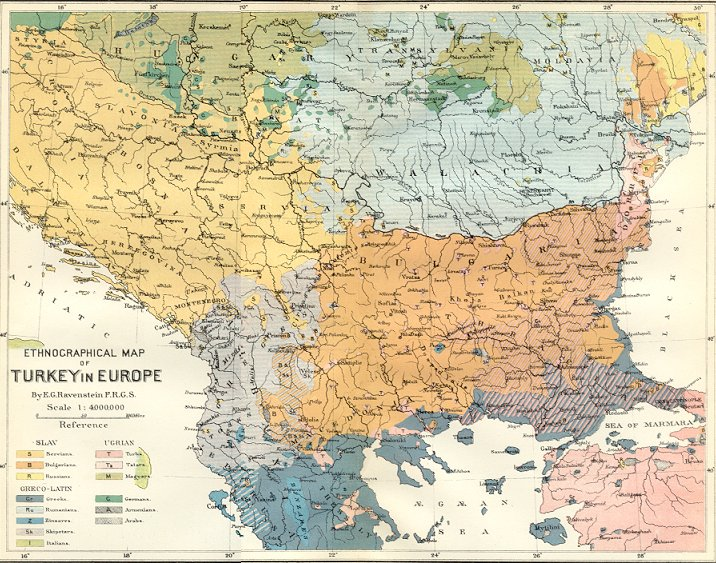
1880 ethnographic map of the Balkans

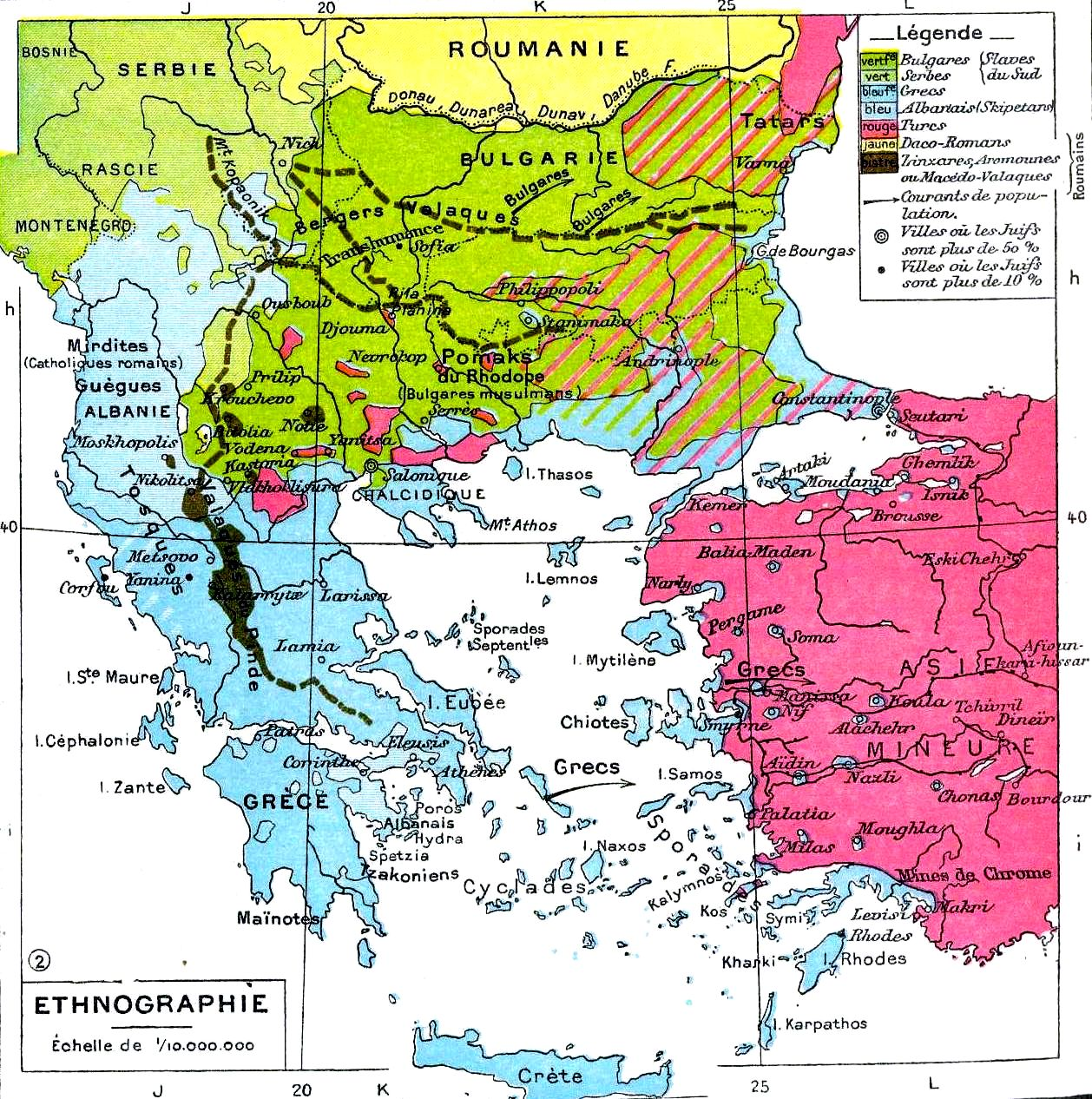
1898 ethnic composition of the Balkans according to a French source

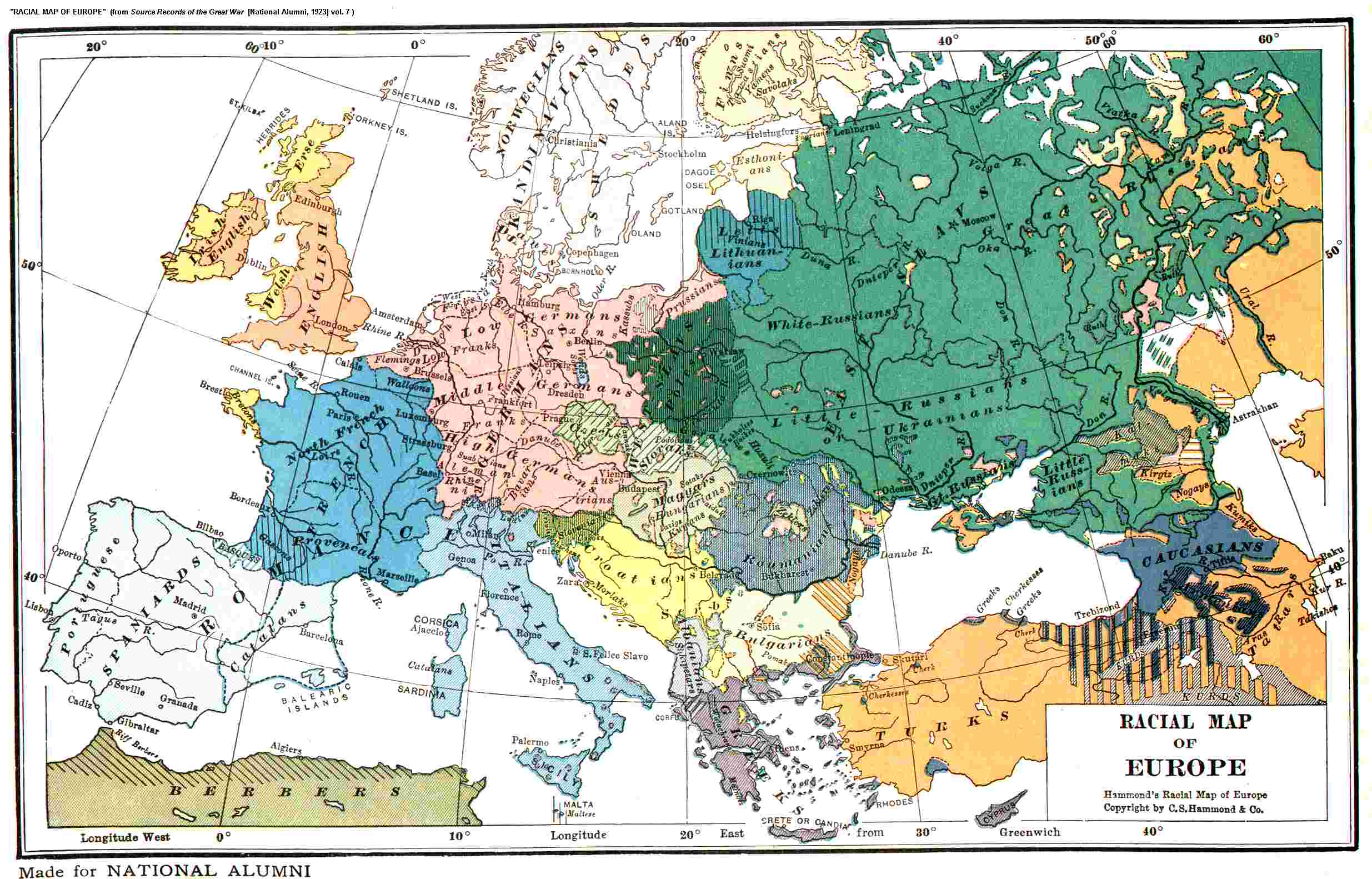
1922 ethnographic map of Europe

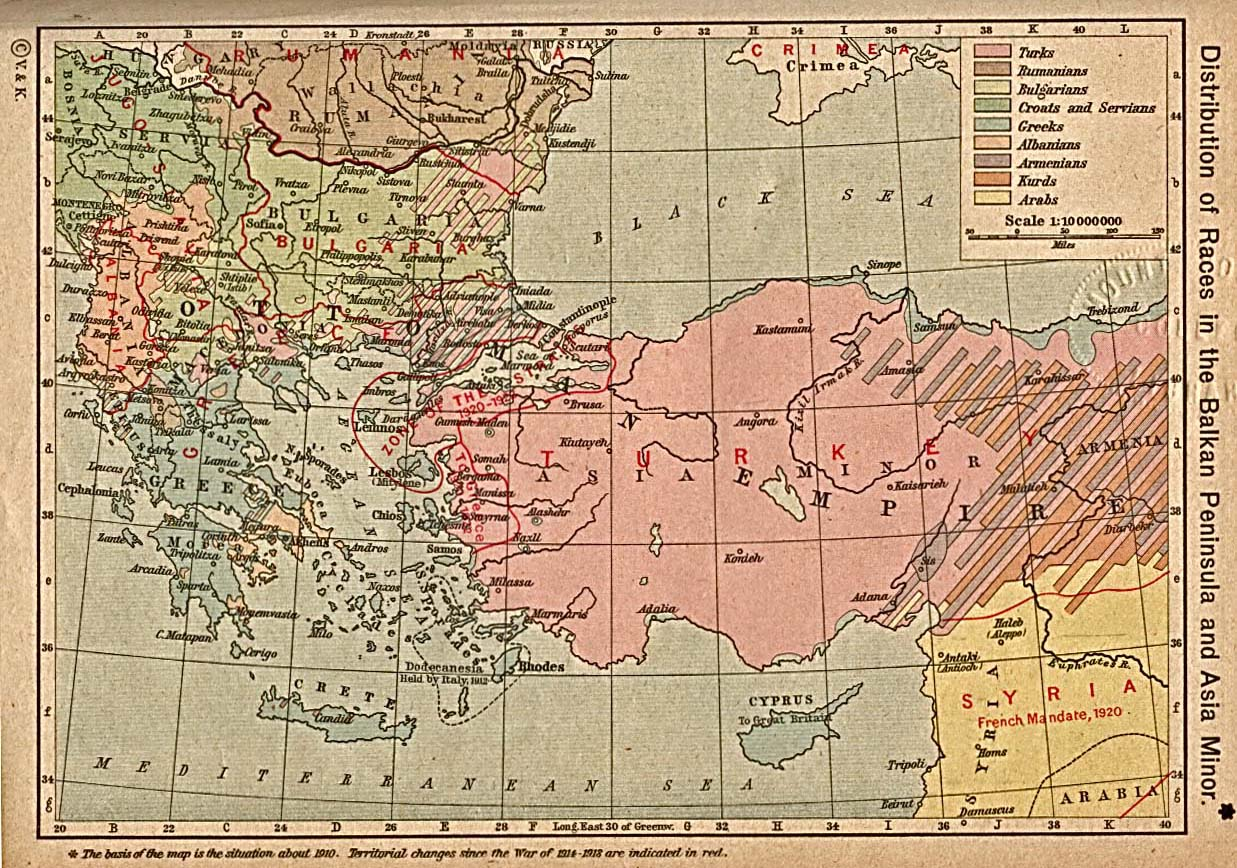
1923 ethnographic map of the Balkans and Turkey.

=== Diaspora ===
There is a large Kosovo Albanian diaspora in central Europe.

== Culture ==
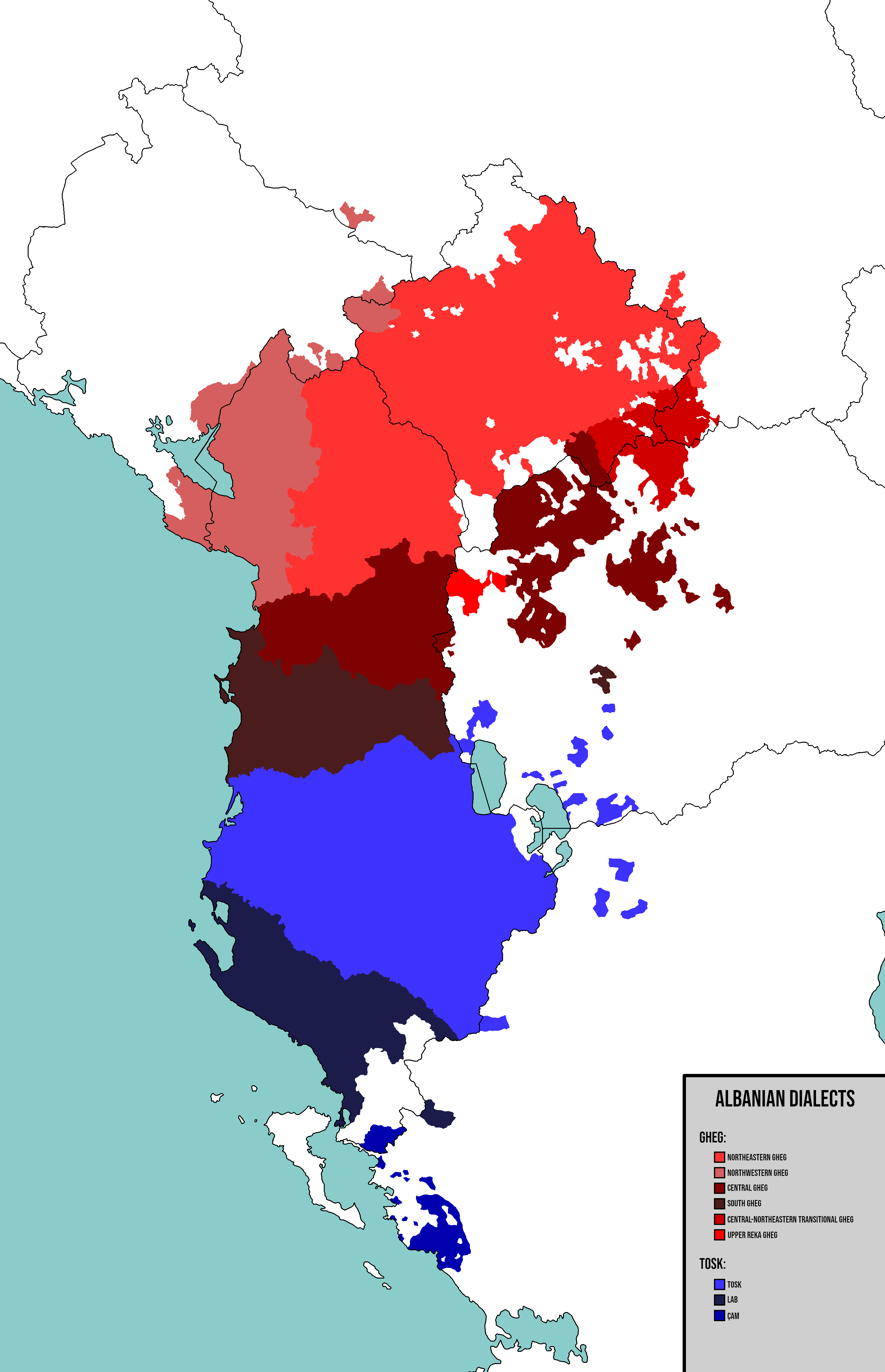
Kosovo Albanians speak the largest subgroup of the Albanian language, called Gheg

Culturally, Albanians in Kosovo are very closely related to Albanians in Albania. Traditions and customs differ even from town to town in Kosovo itself. The spoken dialect is Gheg, typical of northern Albanians. The language of state institutions, education, books, media and newspapers is the standard dialect of Albanian, which is closer to the Tosk dialect.

=== Religion ===
The vast majority of Kosovo Albanians are Sunni Muslims. There are also Catholic Albanian communities estimated between 60,000 to 65,000 in Kosovo, concentrated in Gjakova, Prizren, Klina and a few villages near Peja and Viti. Converting to Christianity has experienced some growth among Albanian Muslims in Kosovo in the 21st century.

=== Art ===
For a long period of time, Kosovafilm (1975‒2003) represented the Kosovan film industry. It released movies in Albanian, created by Kosovar Albanian movie-makers. The National Theatre of Kosovo is the main theatre where plays are shown regularly by Albanian and international artists.

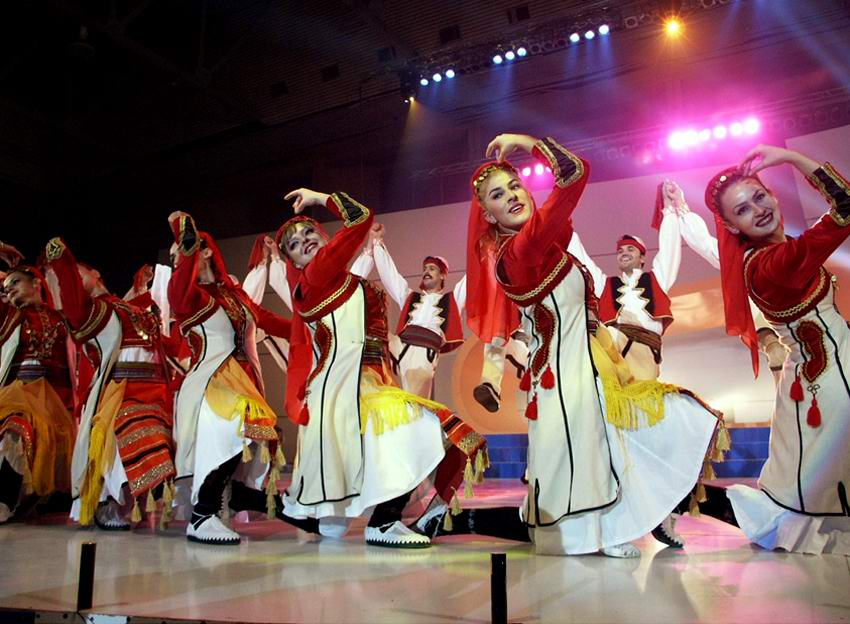
Kosovo Albanian ethnic costume and dance.

=== Music ===
Music has always been part of Albanian culture. Although in Kosovo music is diverse (as it was mixed with the cultures of different regimes dominating Kosovo), authentic Albanian music does still exist. It is characterized by use of çiftelia (an authentic Albanian instrument), mandolina, mandola and percussion. Folk music is very popular in Kosovo. There are many folk singers and ensembles. Modern music in Kosovo has its origin from western countries. The main modern genres include pop, hip hop/rap, rock, and jazz. Kosovo Radio televisions such as RTK, RTV21 and KTV have their musical shows.

=== Education ===
Education is provided for all levels, primary, secondary, and university degrees. University of Pristina is the public university of Kosovo, with several faculties and majors. The National Library (BK) is the main and the largest library in Kosovo, located in the centre of Pristina. There are many other private universities, among them American University in Kosovo (AUK), and many secondary schools and colleges such as Mehmet Akif College.

== See also ==
- Albanians in Serbia
- Albanian nationalism in Kosovo
- Albania-Kosovo relations

== Sources ==
- Curtis, Matthew (2012). Slavic-Albanian Language Contact, Convergence, and Coexistence. Ohio State University. ISBN 9781267580337.
- Kushner, Harvey W. (4 December 2002). Encyclopedia of Terrorism. SAGE Publications. pp. 206–. ISBN 978-1-4522-6550-6.
- Gawrych, George (2006). The crescent and the eagle: Ottoman rule, Islam and the Albanians, 1874–1913. London: IB Tauris. ISBN 978-1845112875.
- Malcolm, Noel (1998). Kosovo: A Short History. Macmillan. ISBN 0-333-66612-7.
- Marsden, Chris (16 March 2000). "British documentary substantiates US-KLA collusion in provoking war with Serbia". WSWS. Archived from the original on 13 September 2022.
