= Hellbanianz (gang) =

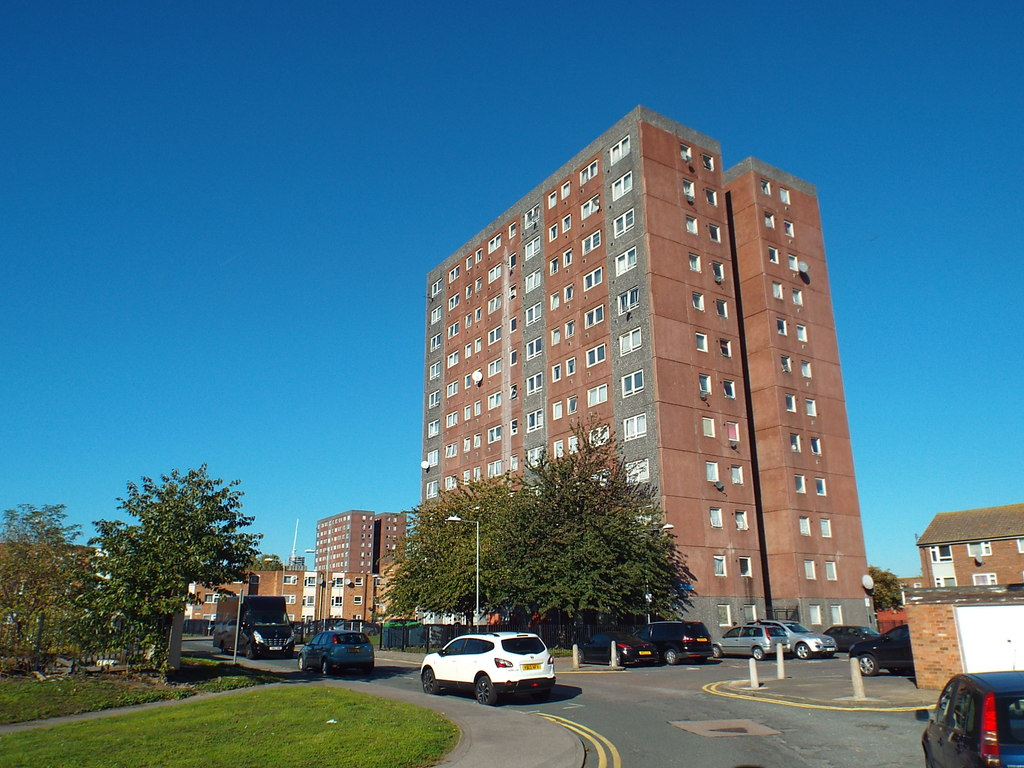
- View of Gascoigne Estate where the gang is based
- Founding location: Gascoigne Estate, Barking, London
- Territory: Barking
- Leader: Tristen Asllani
- Activities: Drug trafficking, Armed robbery
- Allies: Albanian mafia
- Rivals: Kinahan Cartel, A-team, Huyton Firm

Hellbanianz is an organised street gang based in the Gascoigne Estate in Barking, London.

== History ==
In 2016 Tristen Asllani, named by The Guardian as Hellbanianz's most prominent member, was sentenced to 25 years in prison for drug dealing and firearms offenses. Asllani was arrested after crashing a car into a shop in Crouch End after a police pursuit; the police found 21 kilograms of cocaine in the car. They also found a Škorpion submachine gun hidden by Asllani and £6 million worth of drugs at a property in Crouch End.

In 2017 Hellbanianz went viral by posting their wealth and firepower on Instagram and YouTube according to Muhamed Veliu, an investigative journalist, the images posted on the accounts were intended to convince Albanian youths that the "streets of the UK, Holland, France, Belgium, Italy, Switzerland and all of Europe are paved with gold." By 2018, their Instagram account had 115,000 followers and their Facebook page had 13,000 before they were taken down.

In 2019 it was found that rappers Vinz and Stealth were using music to recruit new members to the Hellbanianz; in response, YouTube took down their content.

In 2020 Azen "Ziro" Dajçi, Fabion Kuci and Ardi Sheta were sentenced to a combined 15 years in prison for their involvement in an armed robbery.
