= Brian Charrington =

British drug trafficker (1956 or 1957 – 2025)

- police mugshot c. 2015
- Born: 1956 or 1957; England
- Died: 22 July 2025 (aged 68); Villajoyosa, Spain
- Occupations: Drug trafficker, car dealership owner
- Status: Convicted
- Criminal charges: Conspiracy to smuggle cocaine, drug trafficking, money laundering, people trafficking
- Penalty: Seven years (Germany, 2003), Two years (France), 15 years (Spain, 2018)
- Accomplices: Curtis Warren; Brian Charrington Jr.

Brian Charrington (1956 or 1957 – 22 July 2025) was an English drug trafficker and owner of a car dealership in Middlesbrough who, along with Curtis "Cocky" Warren, operated in North East England during the late-1980s and eventually built a criminal empire with links to Germany, France, Spain and Austria as well as connections in South America and the United States.

== Biography ==
Using his personal yacht, the two men sailed to France on visitor passports and, with 10-year passports, travelled to Venezuela in September 1991 where they arranged with neighbouring Colombian drug cartels to smuggle large amounts of cocaine in steel boxes concealed in lead ingots into Great Britain. Although one ingot was examined in the first shipment, customs officials allowed the shipment to pass through.

However, later notified by Dutch police, customs stopped a second shipment which contained 907 kg of cocaine and had Charrington, Warren and twenty-six others placed under arrest in early 1992. Despite Charrington's status as an informant for the North-East Regional Crime Squad, customs officials went forward with their prosecution despite protests from his "handlers" Harry Knaggs and Ian Weedon. Eventually, through Tory MP Tim Devlin, a meeting was arranged in which Customs was ordered to drop charges against Charrington on 28 January 1993 (several months later, Knaggs was allegedly noticed by customs officials driving a £70,000 BMW registered to Charrington). Although British authorities were unable to bring him to trial in Manchester on his involvement in the smuggling of cocaine worth an estimated £150 million, Britain's security forces – who admitted he was their "supergrass" on Colombian cartels – re-homed him in Australia where his visa was revoked shortly after his arrival. Travelling to Spain, he resided at the Costa Blanca resort in Calpe and later, from a fortified villa, laundered millions of pounds which he used to bring hashish from Morocco across the border which he continued to sell.

During the late-1990s, Charrington would continue to be in court when, while at Bristol Crown Court, he was acquitted of charges after it was found customs officers had illegally boarded his boat carrying 4 tons of hashish worth £80 million in 1999. Illegally re-entering the country to see his family in 2002, he was arrested by police near Exeter and placed on trial at Leeds Crown Court involving two suspended detectives and a former detective which would be dismissed when the judge refused to admit phone tap recording as evidence.

Soon after his court appearance, a warrant was issued by the Bow Street Magistrates' Court for his extradition to Germany and, in July 2003, Charrington was sentenced to seven years in Frankfurt, Germany for conspiracy to smuggle cocaine into Germany (phone recordings linking Charrington to a smuggling operation run by his son Brian Charrington, Jr., who served four years and three months, were used in his conviction). In January 2009, Brian Charrington was attacked by Brian Charrington Jr. and hospitalised. This created a bitter rivalry between the two and both issued death threats.

Following his release in 2006, he was extradited to France to serve a two-year prison term after 650 kilos of hashish were found in his possession on his yacht in the English Channel in 1995.

In a civil suit filed by the Assets Recovery Agency (ARA) in 2004, the government agency ruled that assets seized from Charrington and Warren following their trial in 1992 had been acquired as a result of criminal activity, specifically money laundering and people trafficking. Although both men claimed ownership of the estimated £3.6 million, each had earlier denied ownership following the seizure of the original £2.2 million from Charrington's residence in Middlesbrough by HM Customs & Excise in 1992.

After Charrington's claim that the money had been earned from legitimate diamond dealing was rejected three months earlier by the High Court (who believed he had been laundering the money for Mario Halley), Warren was allowed additional time to provide evidence to back up his claim, however, his appeal was also rejected on 6 October. Subsequently, the ARA was granted its largest Civil Recovery Order with the proceeds going towards funding government crime reduction programmes.

In 2018 Charrington was detained by Spanish police. Spanish national police recovered some 220 kilos of cocaine allegedly hidden in his luxury villa in Spain. In November 2018, Charrington was ordered to serve a 15-year prison sentence by a court in Alicante, Spain.

The Spanish press referred to Charrington as "el narco que escribía en Wikipedia" (English translation "the narco who wrote on Wikipedia"), because of his reputation for updating and correcting his Wikipedia entry.

Charrington died on 22 July 2025, at the age of 68.
