= Vinz (rapper) =

Albanian rapper (born 1992)

- Born: Ervin Selita; 25 September 1992 (age 33); Burrel, Albania
- Genres: Albanian hip hop; gangsta rap; drill
- Occupations: Rapper; singer; songwriter
- Years active: 2015–present
- Label: HB Records
- Member of: Hellbanianz

Ervin Selita (born 25 September 1992), professionally known as Vinz, is an Albanian rapper and songwriter. He is one half of the music group Hellbanianz with fellow Albanian rapper Stealth.

In 2019 it was found that Vinz and Stealth were using music to recruit new members to the Hellbanianz gang; in response, YouTube took down their content.

== Discography ==
=== Singles ===
As lead artist

Title	Year	Peak chart positions	Album
Title	Year	ALB	Album
"My Shqipez"	2016	17	Non-album single
"Nobody" (featuring Stealth)	2016	35	Non-album single
"Hood Life" (featuring Stealth)	2017	—	Non-album single
"Corleone Remix" (featuring Baseman)	2017	—	Non-album single
"Young Shqipe"	2018	4	Non-album single
"Shqipet E Marr"	2019	—	Non-album single
"Freestyle"	2021		

Latest song's:

"Behind Bars"	2023	17	Non-album single

As featured artist

Title	Year	Peak chart positions	Album
Title	Year	ALB	Album
"Nuk Ka Dashni" Stealth (featuring Vinz)	2017	—	Non-album single
"Never Late" Stealth (featuring Vinz)	2018	—	Non-album single
"Gango" Stealth (featuring Cozman and Vinz)	2018	—	Non-album single

Latest song's:

"Hood Life 3" Stealth (featuring Vinz)	2023	—	Non-album single
"CAMORRA" Stealth (featuring Vinz, Azet)	2024	—	Non-album single
