= Turkish mafia =

General term for organized criminal groups based in Turkey

- Founded: 1970s
- Founding location: Turkey
- Years active: 1970s–present
- Territory: Turkey, Azerbaijan, Iraq, Germany, Sweden, United Kingdom, Russia, Italy, Bulgaria, Albania, Spain, Kazakhstan, Israel, Balkans, Turkmenistan, France, Netherlands, Belgium, United States, Switzerland, Norway, Romania
- Ethnicity: Turkish, Turkish Cypriots, Bulgarian Turks
- Criminal activities: Arms trafficking, assassination, assault, bank fraud, blackmailing, bribery, car bombing, car theft, contract killing, counterfeiting, drug trafficking, extortion, forced prostitution, fraud, human trafficking, infiltration of politics, illegal gambling, insurance fraud, kidnapping, money laundering, murder, police corruption, police impersonation, prostitution, racketeering, tax evasion, theft, witness intimidation, witness tampering
- Allies: British firms Albanian mafia Sicilian Mafia; Azerbaijani mafia Pakistani mafia Russian mafia Colombian cartels Bulgarian mafia Serbian mafia Sinaloa Cartel; Cartel of the Suns
- Rivals: Armenian mafia Greek mafia Kurdish mafia

Turkish mafia (Turkish: Türk mafyası) is the general term for criminal organizations based in Turkey and/or composed of current or former Turkish citizens. Crime groups with origins in Turkey are active throughout Western Europe (where a strong Turkish immigrant community exists) and less so in the Middle East. Turkish criminal groups participate in a wide range of criminal activities, internationally the most important being drug trafficking, especially heroin. In the trafficking of heroin they cooperate with Bulgarian mafia groups who transport the heroin further to countries such as Italy. Recently however, Turkish mafia groups have also stepped up in the cocaine trafficking world by directly participating in the massive cocaine smuggling pipeline that runs transnationally from South America to Europe. They allegedly have a lucrative partnership with the Venezuelan drug-trafficking organization known as the Cartel of the Suns who ships them cocaine along with criminal elements from Ecuador. Turkish organized crime has pushed into less traditional cocaine markets as well such as into Eastern Europe, the Caucasus, and the wealthy petro-states of the Persian Gulf. Cosa Nostra and the Turkish mafia are also known to be very close. Criminal activities such as the trafficking of other types of drugs, illegal gambling, human trafficking, prostitution or extortion are committed in Turkey itself as well as European countries with a sizeable Turkish community such as Germany, Netherlands, Belgium, Albania, and the United Kingdom.

== History ==
The Turkish mafia was involved in the weapons trade in the 1970s, and the heroin trade in the 1980s to present, and then moved along into human smuggling.

Bekir Çelenk was one of the members of the Turkish mafia and was involved in the plot to assassinate pope John Paul II.

=== Ties to deep state ===
Some members of the Turkish mafia have ties to the deep state in Turkey, including the National Intelligence Organization (MIT), as well as the far-right movement Grey Wolves. These ties became public during the Susurluk scandal.

The Grey Wolves represent an ideological organization close to certain mafia groups. This organization was an instrument to fight the Kurds of PKK. The ideology of the Grey Wolves unites many far-right radical nationalists close to the MHP and the AK Party.

== Crime groups ==
Criminal groups composed of Turks are active throughout the country and in communities with a large ethnically Turkish population. Certain Turkish criminal groups have strong links with corrupt politicians and corrupt members of the local law enforcement. They are active in different sections of organized crime and can often be linked to politically motivated groups, such as the Grey Wolves. This can especially be the case with criminals in immigrant Turkish communities. Powerful and important Turkish criminal organizations mostly have their origin in the Trabzon Province and incorporate members of the Turkish populations.

=== Eastern Black Sea crime groups ===
Even though crime groups composed of Turks come from all over the country, a relatively high amount of them have origins in the Black Sea region of Turkey, especially in Trabzon. These groups consisting of Turks are especially strong in the country itself. Eastern Black Sea crime bosses such as Alaattin Çakıcı are known from having links to or being members of the politically motivated group Grey Wolves.

=== Turkish Cypriot crime groups ===
Turkish organised crime groups have been active in the United Kingdom since the 1980s as a consequence of the wave of Turkish immigrants to the country in the previous two decades. Following the substantial immigration of Turkish Cypriots to London criminal gangs composed of Turkish Cypriots were formed in working-class neighborhoods. The South East-based Arifs controlled London's underworld for a brief time in the early 1990s. Mainly involved in drug trafficking, armed robbery, money laundering these crime clans have more in common with the traditional White British crime firms than with the Turkish mafia.

The fall of the Taliban during the 2001 invasion of Afghanistan saw the longtime ban on opium cultivation being lifted. In October 2001, Ian Burrell of The Independent speculated that opium might become a highly lucrative trade for Turkish criminal organisations who already controled the smuggling and distribution of heroin in Britain. This was disputed by British police officials at the time. This was supported by the National Criminal Intelligence Service reporting that that the street price of heroin "has remained stable for several years at about £70 a gram" despite a bumper crop being harvested under the Taliban in Afghanistan two years earlier.

== Notable Turkish mafiosi ==
- Nurullah Tevfik Ağansoy
- Arif family
- Hakan Ayik
- Alaattin Çakıcı
- Necati Arabaci
- Abdullah Çatlı
- Nedim Imac
- Dündar Kılıç
- Yasar Avni Musullulu
- Kürşat Yılmaz
- Sedat Peker

== See also ==
- Allegations of Grey Wolves drug trafficking
- Susurluk scandal
- Turkish mafia in Germany
