= Crime in Greater Manchester =

Crime in Greater Manchester has the second-highest incidence in England and Wales after Greater London. Crime in Greater Manchester is the responsibility of the GMP (Greater Manchester Police and its chief constable Ian Hopkins). Its PCC was abolished in May 2017.

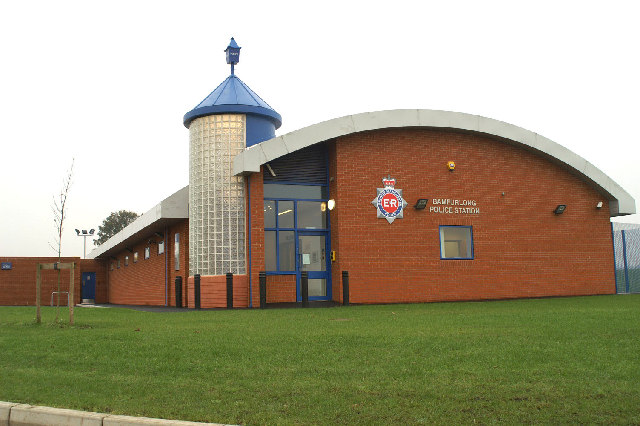
Bamfurlong police station in November 2005

== History ==
Greater Manchester is the second-largest metropolitan area in the UK outside of London. The area had around 334,000 recorded crimes in 2018, compared to around 165,000 for Lancashire and around 134,000 for Merseyside. Similar to Greater Manchester's number of crimes are West Yorkshire (291,000 in 2018), West Midlands (252,000 in 2018) and Kent (197,000). The Metropolitan Police had 835,000 recorded crimes in 2018.

== Types of crime ==
=== Violence against the person ===
Violence against the person accounts for 17% of total crime in the city.

Criminal damage accounts for 10% of total crime.

=== Burglary ===
For the quarter ending in December, 2020, the burglary rate in Greater Manchester was 1.96 crimes per thousand residents. The subsequent burglary rate reached a high of 2.33 crimes per thousand residents in the quarter ending in December 2021, and was as low as 1.40 crimes per thousand residents for the quarter ending December 2022.

=== Motoring ===
Around 124,000 speeding motorists were caught from 2018 to 2019, the most in the UK, and around 2,600 more than London.

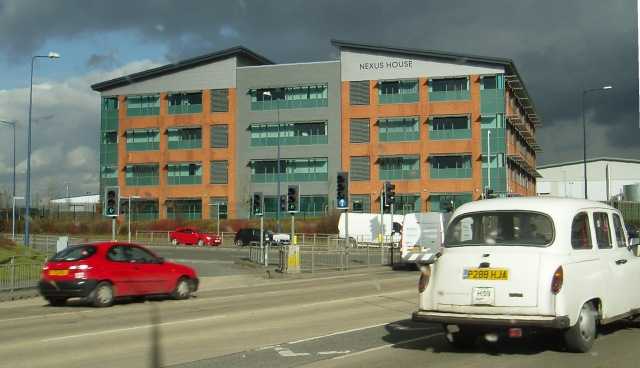
Nexus House, the headquarters of GMP in 2011

=== Terrorism ===
During the Troubles, the Provisional IRA carried out the 1996 Manchester Bombing using a lorry bomb, the largest bomb detonated in Great Britain since the Second World War. The attack left 212 injured, but caused no fatalities, and resulted in about £700 million worth of damage. Manchester had earlier been bombed by the IRA in a 1992 attack, also resulting in no fatalities.

In 2017, an Islamist extremist suicide bomber detonated a shrapnel-laden bomb, targeting people leaving Manchester Arena following an Ariana Grande concert. Twenty-three people were killed, including the bomber, and 239 were physically injured, in the deadliest terrorist attack in the United Kingdom since the 7 July 2005 London bombings.

== Areas ==
When talking about the most dangerous areas of Manchester; Moss Side, Salford, Cheetham Hill, Longsight, and Oldham are the places where criminal and illegal activities are on the top.

== Facilities ==
The National Ballistics Intelligence Service (NABIS), known as the Northern NABIS Hub, is in Manchester, where the organisation works with the Integrated Ballistics Identification System (IBIS).

== See also ==
- Crime in Merseyside
- Gun crime in south Manchester
- Greater Manchester Police Museum
- Law enforcement in the United Kingdom
