= Woolwich Boys =

Criminal organisation

- Founded: Late 1990s
- Founding location: Woolwich, south-east London, England
- Years active: 1990s–present
- Territory: Woolwich
- Ethnicity: Predominantly Somali and Black British
- Membership (est.): 300
- Criminal activities: Drug trafficking, murder, robbery, contract killing, attempted murder

The Woolwich Boys is an organised street gang based in Woolwich, south-east London.

== History ==
The Woolwich Boys emerged in and are named after the Woolwich neighbourhood in south-east London. Starting as a youth gang, mainly active in street crime, the Woolwich Boys are alleged to have grown into a well-structured criminal organisation mainly involved in drug trafficking and contract killing. Younger offshoots of the gang like the so-called Younger Woolwich Boys are mostly active in violent street crime, while older members are known for operating large cocaine-trafficking rings. The Woolwich Boys are said to be highly active in the contract killing business as well, operating small hit squads involved in the taxing and occasional killing of rival drug traffickers and targets. Cleavers, as well as AK-47's are said to have been used.

In 2007, younger members of the gang fought a turf war in Woolwich with rival youths. Due to heightened police pressure in the London area, the group had by early 2013 begun moving its operations outside of the city. In August 2013, police launched dawn raids in the Greenwich borough and Gillingham on the outskirts of London, breaking up a new drug distribution set up there by alleged gang members.
