= Arifs (gang) =

London criminal gang

Arif family
- Founded by: Mehmet Arif, Deniz Arif and Doğan Arif
- Founding location: South London
- Years active: 1980s–2016
- Territory: South London
- Ethnicity: Turkish Cypriot
- Criminal activities: Drug trafficking, armed robbery, arms trafficking, extortion
- Allies: Adams family Turkish mafia
- Rivals: Baybaşin family

The Arifs are a south-east London-based Turkish Cypriot criminal organisation heavily involved in armed robbery, drug trafficking and other racketeering-related activities within London's underworld since the late 1960s. Following the downfall of the Kray brothers, the Arifs were one of several criminal organisations who took control of the London underworld including the Clerkenwell crime syndicate and the Brindle family. with whom they were engaged in a highly publicised gangland war during the 1990s.

The Arifs were considered the leading crime family in the London area throughout the late 1980s before the arrest and conviction of most of its leadership, including most of the Arif family members, for armed robbery and drug-related offences in early 1990s. In 2004, the Irish Daily Mirror called the Arifs "Britain's No 1 crime family." This was also said by some media outlets in 2016.

== History ==
They are Turkish-Cypriot in origin have been operating in south-east London since the 1960s. After the demise of the Kray brothers, several criminal enterprises attempted to move into the vacuum left behind. The Arifs are known to be, or have been involved in racketeering, drug smuggling, armed robbery and murders. The gang is led by brothers Deniz, Mehmet and Doğan Arif but more brothers are involved in the various operations.

In November 1990, Deniz and Mehmet, wearing Ronald Reagan masks and wielding shotguns, were arrested in Woodhatch (Reigate, Surrey) as they attempted to rob a Securicor van. Mehmet Arif, who was driving a pick-up used in the robbery, was shot by police, but survived. His passenger, Kenneth Baker, was armed with a sawn-off shotgun, and was shot dead as he attempted to open fire on officers.

Bekir Arif, 52, known as "The Duke", one of seven brothers in the family, was convicted of conspiracy to supply 100 kg of heroin worth £12.5 million in 1999 and given a 23-year term of imprisonment. Dogan Arif, also jailed for drug smuggling, is said to be controlling the family fortune from prison. Their family is said to maintain ties with relations in Turkey who oversee shipments arriving in mainland Europe.
