= Huyton Firm =

British organized crime group

The Huyton Firm is an organised crime group based in the Huyton area of Liverpool, Merseyside, England. Founded in the 1990s, the group has been involved in large-scale drug trafficking, blackmail, contract killing and violent crime. The gang rose to prominence by filling a power vacuum left by other notorious Liverpool criminals, such as Curtis Warren and Colin "Smigger" Smith, following Warren’s imprisonment and Smith’s death. The Huyton Firm became one of the most powerful and secretive crime organizations in the UK, with significant international connections.

== History and Operations ==
⁣The Huyton Firm was founded in the 1990s by two brothers, Vincent and Francis Coggins from the Huyton area. The brothers set up a compound in Costa del Sol where they smuggled in drugs like cocaine and heroin through the Port of Liverpool to be smuggled across Glasgow, Swansea, Manchester and Plymouth as well as in Liverpool.

=== Major criminal activities ===
The Huyton Firm's operations primarily centred on drug trafficking, but they were also involved in blackmail, extortion, and violent attacks. In late 2010s, the Huyton Firm started a terror campaign to escalate a court case by throwing explosives and using firearms. In one instance, a grenade was left outside the house of Kenny Dalglish as a form of intimidation.

Paul Woodford, an enforcer for Huyton Firm, was responsible for inhumane acts which included scalping a women with a machete and torturing a man with hot iron. He was also allegedly responsible for the death of Jason Osu, but was found not guilty.

== Arrests and trials ==
In May of 2020, Jason and Craig Cox, together with Richard Caswell's crew raided their stash house in West Derby to steal a stash of cocaine worth £1,000,000 and injured a father and son. The Huyton Firm, vowing for revenge, set off to find the perpatrators of the attack. They relayed messages and plans to find and kill the robbers on EncroChat. CCTV footage of the robbery was obtained by Thomas Cashman to help their search. French and Dutch authorities had hacked into the encription of the messaging app and followed their plans closely alongside the North West Regional Organised Crime Unit and the National Crime Agency. They were subsequently arrested before their plans came to be.

Vincent Coggins, the gang's leader, was sentenced to 28 years in prison in early 2024 after being convicted of drug trafficking and blackmail. His trusted associates, including Paul Woodford and Michael Earle, were also jailed for their roles in the firm’s activities. Woodford, a known enforcer for the gang, received a 24-and-a-half-year sentence, while Earle was sentenced to 11 years.

Enforcer Paul Woodford was sentenced to 24 years and six months. Michael Earle and Paul Fitzsimmons were given 11 years and 12 years and six months respectively.

Edward Jarvis, an important senior figure in the cartel, was sentenced to 25 years in prison for cocaine and heroin trafficking and conspiracy to blackmail.

His brother Francis Coggins remained on the run until he was arrested in June 2025 in the Netherlands and was extradited back to the UK. He was subsequently sentenced to 18 years in prison.

== See also ==
Gangs in Liverpool
