= Progress Jersey =

Progress Jersey is a charity and pressure group in Jersey. It was formed in November 2005 by Darius Pearce, Daren O'Toole and Gino Risoli. The original aim of Progress Jersey was to encourage electoral participation however it soon became a regular contributor to the Scrutiny process and has lobbied primarily on issues relating to compliance with the European Convention of Human Rights.

Its active membership is chiefly drawn from the members of the Municipality of the Parish of Saint Helier.

== Organisation ==
At the first annual meeting the members renewed their commitment to avoid adopting a formal structure and organisations and decisions are made by majority vote of members attending each meeting. Four authorised spokespersons were appointed at this time. In January 2007 it was recognised that a more formal approach had to be taken and they would organise as a charity.

In May 2007, Darius Pearce announced that he should stand at the next election it would be as a member of the Jersey Conservative Party and resigned from the board to ensure complete separation of the personnel of the charity and the political party.

Progress Jersey has been active in online political discussions.

== Activities ==
Progress Jersey commenced production of a quarterly newsletter for the Parish of St Helier called Parish Matters in Quarter One of 2007 and undertakes 'independent of government' surveys of political opinion amongst Jersey residents.

== Legislative successes ==
=== Abuse of trust ===
As the States of Jersey considered reform of the age of consent, Progress Jersey spearheaded the campaign to introduce greater safeguards for children before any changes were made. The proposition was withdrawn at the first attempt following an e-mail circulated to States Members on the eve of the debate by and a revised law with Abuse of Trust provisions was submitted subsequently and accepted.

=== Civil partnerships ===
Progress Jersey spearheaded the campaign to introduce homosexual civil partnerships in Jersey. Originally a submission was made to Jersey Scrutiny which was passed to the Legislation Committee. In 2006 Senator Philip Ozouf announced his support for the petition organized by Progress Jersey. In May 2011 the legislation was passed.

=== Reform of Jersey Legitimacy Laws ===
Progress Jersey made a submission to Jersey Scrutiny highlighting the inconsistency of the Legitimacy (Jersey) Law 1973, as amended with the position of Jersey as a signatory to the European Convention of Human Rights.

The proposition was accepted by Scrutiny in June 2006 and the matter referred to the Legislation Committee.

In January 2007, following the introduction of the Human Rights (Jersey) Law 2000 a case was brought before the Royal Court by a local lawyer who claimed that her illegitimate child was being discriminated against as he could not take the name of his father and that recording his fatherhood was not allowed.

In June 2007 as part of her announcement to step down from office, the Home Affairs Minister Wendy Kinnard indicated that it was her intention to bring a change to the Legitimacy Law.

The law was altered in 2010.

== Ongoing campaigns ==
=== Separation of Judiciary from Legislature ===
It is Progress Jersey's contention that the three situations outlined above are in breach of the European Convention of Human Rights.
