= Crime in Merseyside =

Third highest crime rate in Northwest England

Crime in Merseyside is the third highest in North West England after Greater Manchester and Lancashire. Crime in Merseyside is the responsibility of Merseyside Police, and its chief constable Rob Carden. Unlike Greater Manchester where the role is combined with the Mayor of Greater Manchester, Merseyside has a stand-alone Police and Crime Commissioner.

== History ==
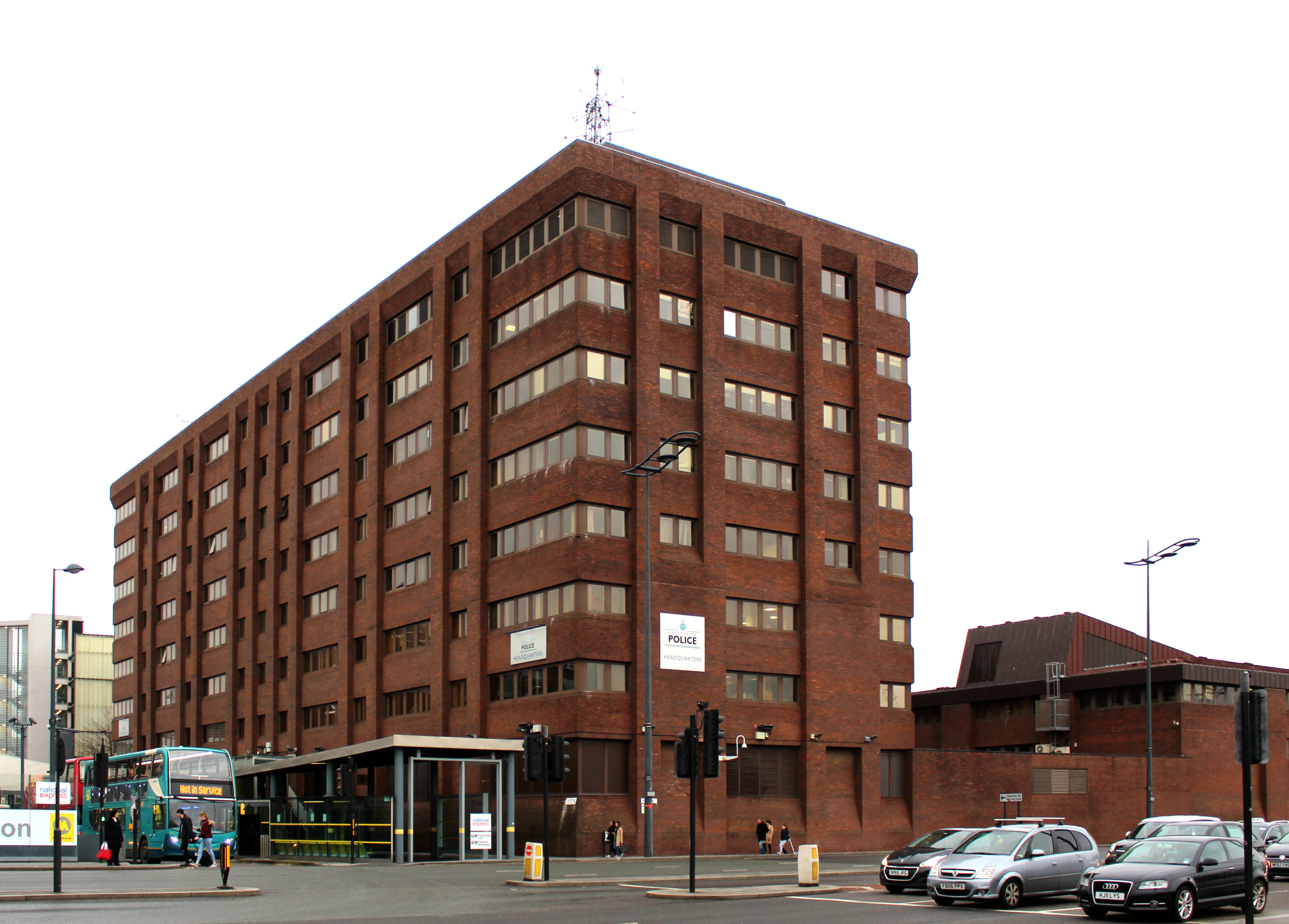
Merseyside Police headquarters in Liverpool in December 2017

In the year ending 2018, Greater Manchester had around 334,000 recorded crimes, Lancashire had around 165,000 recorded crimes, and Merseyside had 134,000 recorded crimes.

== Types of crime ==
In a 2017-18 report, it said that there were 153 active organised crime gangs in Merseyside.

=== Burglary ===
In a 2017-18 report by the Police and Crime Commissioner, it was found that four out of five burglaries in the area went unsolved. The Press Association found that 86% of burglaries had no identified suspect.

=== Rape ===
There are 94 recorded rapes per month in the area.

== Areas ==
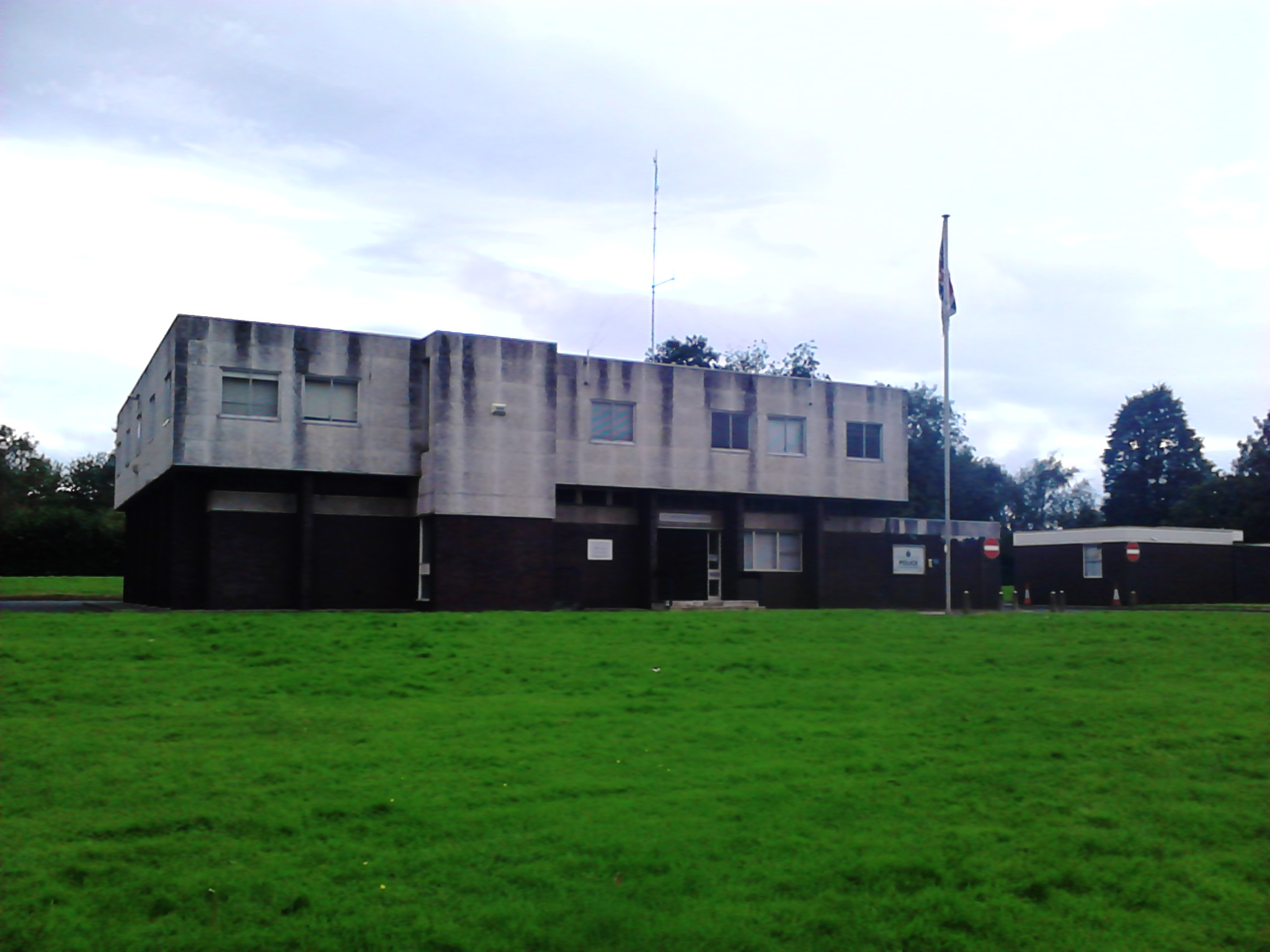
Bebington police station in September 2012

Police in the area have to deal with around 340 crimes per day. The police get around 1 million calls a year in the area.

== See also ==
- Crime in Greater Manchester
