= Albanian hip-hop =

Subgenre of hip hop

Albanian hip hop refers to hip hop from artists from Albania, Kosovo, North Macedonia and surrounding areas where the Albanian language is spoken. Albanian hip hop may also refer to hip hop from the Albanian diaspora in other countries and in other languages.
