= Curtis Warren =

English gangster (born 1963)

- Born: Curtis Francis Warren; 31 May 1963 (age 63); Toxteth, Liverpool, England
- Other name: Cocky
- Status: Released
- Penalty: Juvenile crime: borstal Armed robbery: 5 years Shipment of drugs to the Netherlands: 12 years Manslaughter: 4 years Conspiracy to smuggle cannabis: 13 years

Curtis Francis Warren (born 31 May 1963), also known as Cocky, is an English gangster and drugs trafficker who was formerly Interpol's Target One and was once listed on The Sunday Times Rich List.

== Biography ==
Curtis Warren is the second son of South American born Curtis Aloysius Warren, a seaman with the Norwegian Merchant Navy, and Liverpool born Antonia Chantre, the daughter of a shipyard boiler attendant. He grew up with his elder brother Ramon and sister Maria in Toxteth, Liverpool.

=== Bouncer ===
After Warren was released from jail, local police commented that he had turned his life around, working as a bouncer at a Liverpool nightclub. But it was here that he learnt about the drugs trade, as bouncers have the power to control who comes in and out of a venue. He was able to control dealers' access and then befriend them, giving him an inside education.

=== Charrington and acquittal ===
In the late 1980s, he came to an agreement with Middlesbrough car dealer Brian Charrington. In September 1991, the two men sailed to France on Charrington's personal yacht on then-legal British visitor passports. They then travelled to Venezuela on British 10-year passports, and arranged a deal with the Cali cartel to smuggle cocaine in steel boxes, concealed in lead ingots.

On arrival in the UK, HM Customs and Excise cut open one ingot, but found nothing. Having let the shipment pass, they were later informed by Dutch police that the drugs were held in the steel boxes; by which time Charrington, Warren and the shipment were untraceable. However, a second shipment of 907 kilograms (2,000 lb) using the same method was already in transit from South America.

When the shipment landed in the UK in early 1992, Charrington, Warren and twenty-six others were placed under arrest in a prosecution brought by HM Customs and Excise. However, in preliminary court procedures, it was revealed by police that Charrington was a police informant for the North-East Regional Crime Squad. HM Customs officials went forward with their prosecution, despite protests from his police "handlers" Harry Knaggs and Ian Weedon. In Newcastle Crown Court, it was alleged that Warren was so well informed, that he knew the length of the largest drill bit owned by HM Customs, and therefore the size/depth of the required ingots. Eventually, through Conservative MP Tim Devlin, a meeting was arranged in which Customs was ordered to drop charges against Charrington on 28 January 1993. The case was dropped, with all accused including Warren acquitted of all charges.

It is alleged that on release, Warren purposefully walked past the HM Customs agents, saying: "I'm off to spend my £87 million from the first shipment and you can't touch me." Several months later, Knaggs was spotted by HM Customs officials driving a £70,000 BMW, previously registered to Charrington.

=== The Netherlands ===
Warren returned to Liverpool. But with the combination of various ritual killings of several organised crime figures, and the police pursuing him following the high-profile case failure, he had to move.

In 1995, Warren relocated to a villa in Sassenheim in the Netherlands. He owned casinos in Spain, discos in Turkey, a vineyard in Bulgaria, land in the Gambia and had money stashed away in Swiss bank accounts. He could have retired rich, but decided to continue importing drugs.

Monitored by police while calling his contacts in the UK, it was now apparent that Warren's photographic memory was useful for him: he never called contacts by their names, but code words. All Swiss bank account details were kept in his head, and never written down. He never kept accounts for his drug dealing business. The result was that he had an unlimited credit line from cartels in South America, and with cannabis traffickers in Turkey and Eastern Europe.

=== Dutch arrest and prison ===
On 24 October 1996, Brigade Speciale Beveiligingsopdrachten raided Warren's villa, and other property he owned in the Netherlands. Warren and several associates were arrested, with police finding three guns, ammunition; hand grenades, crates with 960 CS gas canisters, 400 kilograms (880 lb) of cocaine, 1,500 kilograms (3,300 lb) of cannabis resin, 60 kilograms (130 lb) of heroin, 50 kilograms (110 lb) of ecstasy, and 400,000 Dutch guilder plus 600,000 US Dollars in cash. The whole haul was estimated to be worth £125 million.

In 1998, Warren made his only appearance in The Sunday Times Rich List, which stated that as a property developer his fortune was estimated at £40 million. His conviction in the subsequent trial ensured his removal from the list.

In court, Warren's plan was shown to be the shipment of South American cocaine to Bulgaria. Shipped to his vineyard, the drugs were then suspended in wine for onward shipment to the Netherlands and Liverpool in the UK. In total, police had retained illegal goods, drugs and wine valued at £125 million. Warren was sentenced to 12 years in jail, in the maximum security Nieuw Vosseveld prison in Vught. However, further forensic accounting investigation only found £20 million of his estimated £120 million fortune, and none of that could be legally touched or confiscated by Dutch police, British police or Interpol.

==== Manslaughter conviction ====
On the afternoon of 15 September 1999, Warren had a fight in the prison yard with Turkish national Cemal Guclu, who was serving a 20-year sentence for murder and attempted murder. Yelling abuse at Warren, Guclu walked towards him and tried to punch him in the face. Evading the punch, a short fight ensued, during which Guclu fell to the ground, and Warren kicked him in the head four times, Guclu got up and again went for Warren and was again punched to the ground. He hit his head, was knocked unconscious and never recovered, later dying in hospital. In his trial defence in 2001, Warren said he "acted in self defence." Finding Warren guilty of manslaughter, the Dutch judge commented that "the defendant had used excessive violence," sentencing him to an additional four years with release scheduled in 2014.

In 2002, Dutch police still investigating the Bulgarian shipment obtained an asset seizure order against Warren. Although they could only find £180,000, they legally charged him to repay 26 million guilders ($14 million) under the proceeds of crime act, or face an added 5 years in prison; this would have extended his release date to 2019. After legal discussion ensued, Warren agreed to pay Dutch police 15 million guilders ($8 million).

==== Trafficking case and release ====
In February 2005, Warren was charged by Dutch authorities with running an international drugs smuggling cartel from his Dutch prison cell. Moved around six jails during his trial for his own safety, he was found guilty but successfully appealed, and was released from prison in June 2007.

Refused a passport by the British, Irish and Portuguese governments, the UK's Serious Organised Crime Agency (SOCA) then followed Warren's every move as part of a "lifetime offender management" programme, under the codename Operation Floss.

In November 2007, Warren's former right-hand man, Colin Smith, was shot dead while leaving Nel's gym in Speke.

=== Jersey conviction ===
Under SOCA's "Operation Floss," just three weeks after being freed from prison in the Netherlands, on Saturday, 30 June 2007, SOCA called Jersey Police to inform them that Warren had arrived at Manchester Airport, and paid cash for a plane ticket. Observed in Jersey with known Liverpool associate and now Jersey resident Taffin Carter, the pair drove around in Carter's VW Golf to various locations, including the isolated St Catherine's Breakwater.

With drugs at three times the street price in Jersey compared with the UK or France, after Warren returned to the UK, Jersey Police created "Operation Koala," monitoring and bugging various locations, including phone boxes and the home of Taffin's girlfriend, Suzanne Scurr. From this, they discovered that a friend of Warren, John Welsh, intended to travel to Amsterdam to meet known Warren associate, Moroccan Mohammed Liazid. Jersey Police wanted to bug Welsh's hire car from Saint-Malo, but were refused permission by French and Belgian police, saying it was a breach of the European Convention on Human Rights. In what Judge Sir Richard Tucker later described as a "reprehensible" and "unlawful" act, Jersey Police, which is not signed into but bound by the ECHR, bugged the car anyway, and with Dutch Police, SOCA and Interpol monitored the transmissions.

In subsequent operations, SOCA monitored Warren in Liverpool, while Dutch police monitored police informant Liazid in Amsterdam, and co-ordinated information from various phone boxes to correlate who was speaking to whom. In the subsequent trial, it was revealed that Warren had three UK and one Jersey mobile, and had made 1,587 telephone calls in three weeks from these and phone boxes across the northwest and North Wales, including the Wirral, Liverpool, Manchester, Llangollen, and Chester to Liazid.

In 2007, Warren was arrested in St Helens, over conspiracy to smuggle drugs; after a joint investigation involving Jersey police, Merseyside Police, SOCA, and law enforcement from Belgium, France and the Netherlands. He pleaded not guilty, and there ensued a two-year legal argument over the legality of the information obtained by the bugging of Welsh's car. After agreement that there was sufficient evidence from other sources to substantiate the case, Jersey Police offered him a deal for pleading guilty of an 8-year jail term and no confiscation of assets: Warren turned this down. The Metropolitan Police agreed to lend Jersey Police a manned armoured prisoner transfer van, so Warren and his associates could be transferred safely during each day of the trial. The court heard that no drugs had been imported as the Jersey contacts had "failed to come up with the money". Senator Ben Shenton raised concerns that Warren's legal representation was at the cost of the Jersey taxpayer, while Progress Jersey raised concerns that the entire resources of the Jersey drug squad had been targeted at Warren.

Warren was found guilty on 7 October for conspiracy to smuggle cannabis. He was sentenced on 3 December 2009 to 13 years imprisonment for his part in the plot. Jersey Police are also starting an investigation into his wealth, with the aim of confiscating his gains from drugs trafficking.

After initially serving his sentence in HMP Full Sutton near York, he was moved to HMP Belmarsh. On two occasions, he has unsuccessfully appealed to the Lieutenant Governor of Jersey General Sir John McColl for leave to appeal his conviction, once in March 2011, and secondly in September 2011.

In November 2013, Warren was ordered to pay a £198m confiscation order, or face another ten years in jail. On 27 March 2014 it was reported that Warren had lost his appeal over his failure to pay the order, and so would remain in prison.

In 2020, Stephanie Smithwhite, a prison officer, was jailed for two years after having intimate relations with him.

In November 2022, Warren was released from prison.

On 27 August 2024, Warren pleaded guilty to six breaches of his Serious Crime Prevention Order (SCPO) at Liverpool Crown Court. He was sentenced to 14 months, suspended for 18 months.
