= John Haase (criminal) =

English gangster (born 1948)

- Born: 1948 (age 77–78); Liverpool, England
- Occupation: Gangster

John Haase (born 1948) is an English gangster and drug dealer. Haase and his nephew Paul Bennett are career criminals with convictions for bank robbery and drug smuggling. In 1996, Haase and Bennett were given a Royal Pardon 11 months into 18-year prison sentences for heroin smuggling, having provided information leading to the seizure of firearms. The Home Secretary, Michael Howard, was criticized for the decision, and in 2008 Haase and Bennett were convicted of having set up the weapons finds to earn them their release, and sentenced to 20 and 22 years in prison respectively.

== Smuggling investigation ==
Haase and Bennett were arrested in 1993 following a long investigation by the British Customs and Excise organisation which was subsequently described in a book by one of the investigating officers. Officers followed a major heroin shipment (worth approximately £18 million) destined for Liverpool as part of a larger investigation into 'Volkan', a Turkish heroin smuggler. As the officers arrested many members of the gang in and around Liverpool, Haase and Bennett nearly slipped through the net, but were arrested in Croydon, south London.

== Trial and sentence ==
After sentencing the two men to 18 years each in prison, Judge David Lynch was contacted by the customs officer in charge of the investigation, Paul Cook. He had been in discussions with Haase and Bennett's solicitor, Tony Nelson, who suggested that in return for their providing information, Customs would undertake to bring any help they gave to the notice of the trial judge, so that they could seek a reduced sentence. The trial judge then wrote privately to the Home Secretary, recommending that he 'exercise the Royal prerogative of mercy' on account of information that the pair had given that had led to the seizure of illegal firearms. Michael Howard ordered their release, which took place on 4 July 1996, and they served less than a year of the sentence. When questioned about his decision, Howard wrote, "I can neither reveal, nor overstate the risks which would flow from revealing any of the details which confidentially had been placed before him (the judge) by the prosecuting authorities, save to say that the information had proved to offer quite enormous and unique assistance to the law-enforcement agencies". Police recovered many firearms, including AK-47 and M16A2 assault rifles, Czechoslovak Sa vz. 23 submachine guns, Thompson submachine guns, Uzi sub-machine guns, shotguns, ammunition and Semtex explosive.

== Perversion of the course of justice case ==
Doubts were expressed by police and Customs and Excise officers as to the authenticity of the information that Haase and Bennett gave, and local Liverpool MP, Peter Kilfoyle campaigned for an investigation.

In March 2001, Kilfoyle was granted a half-hour Adjournment debate in the House of Commons at which he brought up the subject of Haase and Bennett; specifically the damage done to the people of Liverpool by them being allowed back onto the street after such a short period of time in prison, and the basis on which they got out (that is, the Royal pardon they received).

During 2003, it was widely reported that a drug dealer and associate of the two heroin smugglers, Simon Bakerman, who was a cousin of Michael Howard and who openly boasted of his relationship with him, had received a bribe of £400,000 from Haase, which may have been intended to be passed on to the politician. There is no evidence that any such monies were passed on, or that Howard acted in any inappropriate way. Merseyside Police now believe that Customs, the trial judge and Howard himself were duped by an elaborate plot by Haase and Bennett, who arranged for the drugs and guns to be planted where the authorities could find them.

In May 2004, Kilfoyle again brought up the matter at an Adjournment debate. He had visited Haase in prison earlier in 2004, and had obtained a sworn affidavit. The drug smuggler had provided "leads" about the guns which had in fact been planted at the request of him and his accomplice, Bennett. In the affidavit, Haase admitted contacting his acquaintances who were not in prison and getting them to plant guns across Merseyside and the North West of England. He then passed information about the guns' locations to his customs handler Paul Cook, suggesting the guns belonged to other criminals. Haase added, "It was a con all the way." Kilfoyle concluded his comments in the Adjournment debate by saying:

I cannot believe that everyone touching on this case missed the obvious. To a simple-minded lay person such as myself, there can be only two possible conclusions. The first is that Customs and Excise, the Prison Service, the police, the judiciary and the Home Office were all duped by Haase and Bennett. The alternative is that there was, at some stage, some truth in the allegations that bribery played a part in securing Haase and Bennett's release. I do not want to believe that. All of my instincts say that that is not possible. Yet I also find it difficult to believe that no one within the system smelled a rat in the way in which the gun stashes were set up. I just hope that today the Minister can throw some real light on this sordid saga, so that I can explain to my constituents why it is that these people were allowed out.

Following the conclusion of the trial at which the two drug barons received sentences of 20 and 22 years for perverting the course of justice in 2008, Kilfoyle called for an independent enquiry into the issues surrounding the case. He said:

I believe that we need a full, open and independent inquiry into this case, which strikes at the very heart of our criminal justice system. In fact, for quite a while, these people were successful at completely subverting the criminal justice system. On the face of it, the customs were duped, the police were duped, the Home Office was duped, the judge and the judiciary were duped. Everybody was duped by two career criminals. Yet to the best of my knowledge, no one in government has ever accepted any responsibility for this. It is as if it just happened as an act of God. It did not; it happened because the systems were not in place to deal with it.
