= Ghost (communication network) =

Australian-based communications network

Ghost was an Australian-based communications network and service provider that offered modified smartphones allowing encrypted communications among subscribers.

== Background ==
Ghost was originally created around 2015.

== Devices ==
The modified handsets were sold for A$2,350 each which paid for the device and a six-month subscription.

== Infiltration ==
The infiltration was led by the FBI, the National Gendarmerie of France, along with Europol, the Australian Federal Police, the Royal Canadian Mounted Police, an Garda Síochána, Icelandic police, Swedish police, Dutch police, and the Italian Central Directorate for Anti-Drug Service. The operation to infiltrate the network was codenamed "Operation Kraken".

The raids took place on 17 and 18 September 2024.

=== Lead suspect ===
On 18 September Australian national Jay Je Yoon Jung of Narwee, New South Wales faced five charges relating to the development and administration of Ghost in a Sydney court.

== Impact ==
=== Europol ===
Catherine De Bolle, head of Europol said "Today we have made it clear that no matter how hidden criminal networks think they are, they can't evade our collective effort. Law enforcement from nine countries, together with Europol, have dismantled a tool which was a lifeline for serious organized crime. This operation is what Europol is all about: Turning collaboration into concrete results by bringing together the right people, tools, and expertise to address every aspect of this complex operation. The work carried out is part of our ongoing commitment to tackling organized crime wherever it operates. I want to extend my gratitude to all our global partners who played a vital role in making this operation a success."

=== Australia ===
Australian Federal police believe there were around 376 handsets were active in Australia.

=== Ireland ===
An Garda Síochána believed there were 42 of the devices active at the time of the raids. The head of the Garda Drugs and Organised Crime Bureau, Justin Kelly said that Ireland had the second largest userbase of Ghost devices in the world and that four organised crime gangs were targeted through access to Ghost. He also said "During this operation, we targeted four Irish organized crime groups who were involved in drugs trafficking, frequently using violence and intimidation to enforce their illicit trade" and "Most significantly, we have dismantled a primary drugs trafficking route into our country, and in doing so have seized drugs with an approximate street value of €16 million ($17.82 million). We deployed over 300 specialist officers and searched 33 premises across the country during this operation. Our activity to date has resulted in 11 arrests and the seizure of €350,000 ($389,830) in cash, and I can assure you that there will indeed be further arrests. During our operation, we also targeted the key facilitators of this encrypted phone network, and importantly, seized a number of the suspect handsets." He declined to say whether the Kinahan Organised Crime Group were one of the four gangs targeted but reckoned that those targeted were of "extremely high value".

=== Italy ===
Europol said that one member of Sacra Corona Unita had been arrested. They were not named but were said to be a high-ranking figure and were wanted since 2023.

== See also ==
- EncroChat
- Phantom Secure
- ANOM
- MPC
- Sky ECC
- Ennetcom
