= Matrix (app) =

Messaging app seized in 2024

Matrix was an instant messaging (IM) and communications network that was shut down by cooperation between Dutch and French police in December 2024. It was also known by the names Mactrix, Totalsec, X-Quantum and Q-Safe.

== History ==
Dutch police discovered the network while investigating the murder of Peter de Vries in 2021. A mobile phone was found in the getaway car. The phone was found to be connected to the Matrix network.

A joint task force involving Dutch and French police was formed, with 2.3 million messages in 33 languages intercepted. Police forces in Italy, Lithuania, Spain and Germany were also involved. Europol and Eurojust coordinated the investigation.

== Infrastructure ==
The service operated on around 40 servers throughout Europe and had about 8000 users. Users paid between $1350 and $1700 in cryptocurrency for a Google Pixel handset and six months subscription to the service.

== Seizures and arrests ==
Simultaneous raids and searches took place on 3 December 2024 in four countries, leading to the arrest of five suspects in Spain and France, the shutdown of 40 servers in France and Germany, the seizure of 970 encrypted phones, €145,000 in cash, €500,000 in cryptocurrency and four vehicles. A 52-year-old Lithuanian man who was arrested is believed to be the primary owner and operator.

A 30-year-old Dutch man who used the app was arrested. He is suspected of smuggling cocaine in 2020.

== Closure ==
Users of the network were informed of it closing by a splash screen.

== See also ==
- Operation Trojan Shield – a sting operation to intercept messages from criminals via the AN0M app
- EncroChat – a network infiltrated by law enforcement to investigate organized crime in Europe
- Ennetcom – a network seized by Dutch authorities, who used it to make arrests
- Sky Global – a communications network and service provider based in Vancouver, Canada
