= Ciphr =

Software company

Ciphr is a secure messaging company that produces encrypted phones.

In September 2021, after the closure of AN0M, Ciphr closed its operations in Australia. A source told Vice magazine that the company had stopped operations in America, but provided no evidence.

The company provided the following apps running on Android software:

App	Description
Ciphr Text	Instant-messaging app, encrypted end-to-end
Ciphr Mail	Email app
Ciphr Vault	Encrypted storage on device

The company was used heavily by criminal groups, in particular those who smuggled large amounts of illegal narcotics.

A former distributor of Phantom Secure phones said of a meeting with Ciphr representatives: "I felt like I was in a mafia-esque situation during that meeting".

In 2022, it changed its reseller business model. The move was part of the attempt to clean-up its client base after a series law enforcement actions against similar companies that cater to the black market. The new model shifted responsibility to resellers of its encryption technology. The company later announced that it will cease operations after resellers refused to sell Ciphr's products due to the assumed legal liability.

In 2023 OnyxCorp, the company behind the Ciphr app, announced the beta-test of an app called Mode, intended for enterprise applications.
