= Ortis =

Ortis may refer to:

- Ortis Deley (born 1973), British television presenter and actor
- Cameron Ortis, former Director General of the Canadian National Intelligence Coordination Centre convicted in 2023 for leaking secrets and imprisoned
- Samuele Ortis (born 1996), Italian rugby union player
- Venanzio Ortis (born 1955), Italian retired long-distance runner
- Jacopo Ortis, a fictional character in the novel The Last Letters of Jacopo Ortis and the film Jacopo Ortis

== See also ==
- Ortiz, a Spanish-language surname
- Ortiz (disambiguation)
