= EncroChat =

Communications network and service provider

- Industry: Computer software
- Founded: 2016
- Defunct: June 2020
- Area served: Worldwide
- Website: encrochat.network at the Wayback Machine (archived 2018-08-07)

EncroChat was a Europe-based communications network and service provider that offered modified smartphones allowing encrypted communication among subscribers. It was used primarily by organised crime members to plan criminal activities.

Police infiltrated the network between at least March and June 2020 during a Europe-wide investigation. An unidentified source associated with EncroChat announced on the night of 12–13 June 2020 that the company would cease operations because of the police investigation.

The service had around 60,000 subscribers at the time of its closure. In the UK, the National Crime Agency led an operation resulting in over 2,600 arrests and 1,384 criminal charges.

== Background ==
EncroChat handsets emerged in 2016 as a replacement for a previously disabled end-to-end encrypted service. The company had revealed on 31 December 2015 the Version 115 of EncroChat OS, which appears to be the first public release of its operating system.

According to a May 2019 report by the Gloucester Citizen, EncroChat was originally developed for "celebrities who feared their phone conversations were being hacked". In the 2015 murder of English mobster Paul Massey, the killers used a similar service providing encrypted BlackBerry phones based on PGP. After the Dutch and Canadian police compromised its server in 2016, EncroChat turned into a popular alternative among criminals for its security-oriented services in 2017–2018.

The founders and owners of EncroChat are not known. According to Dutch journalist Jan Meeus, a Dutch organised crime gang was involved and financed the developers.

Through a marketing strategy of "relentless online advertising", EncroChat rapidly expanded during its four and a half years of existence, benefiting from the closure of its competitors Amsterdam-based PGP Safe (customised BlackBerry) and Ennetcom. The network eventually reached an estimated 60,000 total subscribers at the time of its closure in June 2020. According to the French National Gendarmerie, 90% of subscribers were criminals, and the British National Crime Agency (NCA) said it found no evidence of non-criminals using it.

EncroChat first came to the attention of the media when it was revealed that high-profile criminals Mark Fellows and Steven Boyle had been using the encrypted devices to communicate during the May 2018 gangland murder of John Kinsella in Rainhill, England. The service resurfaced in the media during the summer of 2020 after law enforcement agencies announced that they had infiltrated the encrypted network and investigative journalist Joseph Cox, who had been reviewing EncroChat for months, published an exposé in Vice Motherboard.

== Functionality and services ==
EncroChat OS
- Homescreen of EncroChat OS
- Developer: EncroChat
- OS family: Unix-like (Linux)
- Working state: Discontinued
- Source model: Based on open source Android
- Initial release: 31 December 2015; 10 years ago
- Supported platforms: BQ Aquaris X2 and others
- Official website: www.encrochat.com

The EncroChat service was available for handsets called "carbon units", whose GPS, camera and microphone functions were disabled by the company for privacy reasons. Devices were sold with pre-installed applications, including EncroChat, an OTR-based messaging app which routed conversations through a central server based in France, EncroTalk, a ZRTP-based voice call service, and EncroNotes, which allowed users to write encrypted private notes. They generally used modified Android devices, with some models based on the BQ Aquaris X2 phone hardware, others on Samsung phones, and sometimes on non-Android BlackBerrys.

Devices with EncroChat were able to boot in two modes. When only the power button was pressed to turn the handset on, they booted into a dummy Android home screen. But when the handset was switched on by pressing the power button together with the volume button, the phone booted to a secret, encrypted partition which facilitated secret communication via EncroChat's French servers. A "panic button" feature was available, where a certain PIN input to the device via the unlock screen would erase all data on the phone. According to journalist Jurre van Bergen, the IP of EncroChat's server was associated with the French web hosting company OVH. EncroChat's SIM provider was the Dutch telecommunications firm KPN.

EncroChat devices were particularly popular in Europe, although they were also sold in the Middle East and elsewhere in the world. One source told Vice Motherboard that they became the "industry standard" among criminals. They were reported in July 2020 to cost €1,000 (£900) each, then €1,500 (£1,350) for a six-month contract to use EncroChat's service. EncroChat's website says that the firm had resellers in Amsterdam, Rotterdam, Madrid and Dubai, although Cox describes EncroChat as a "highly secretive" firm which "does not operate like a normal technology company". The phones were reportedly bought via a physical transaction which "looked like a drug deal", and at least one case involves an ex-military operative selling devices in Northern Ireland.

== Infiltration ==
The EncroChat encrypted messaging service and the related customised phones were discovered by France's National Gendarmerie in 2017 when conducting operations against organised crime gangs. At the time of the Fellows and Boyle trial in December 2018, the NCA struggled to crack the lock screen passcode, as anything was wiped out after a set number of attempts.

The investigation accelerated in early 2019 after receiving EU funding. At the end of January 2020, a judge in Lille, France, authorised the infiltration of the EncroChat servers. Intelligence and technical collaboration between the NCA, the National Gendarmerie and Dutch police culminated in gaining access to messages after the National Gendarmerie put a "technical tool" on EncroChat's servers in France. The malware allowed them to read messages before they were sent and record lock screen passwords. Messages could be read by law enforcement beginning in April. EncroChat estimated that around 50% of devices in Europe were affected in June 2020.

The National Gendarmerie formed a special unit to investigate the hacked information on 15 March 2020, then signed an agreement with the Dutch Police to form a joint investigation team (JIT) on 10 April, co-operating through Eurojust with the support of Europol. The data was distributed by the JIT to other European partners, including the UK, Sweden and Norway. The NCA began to receive information about the content of messages on 1 April 2020, then started to build data analysis technology to automatically "identify and locate offenders by analysing millions of messages and hundreds of thousands of images". The chief of the Dutch National Police Force, Jannine van den Berg, compared the malware to "sitting at the table where criminals were chatting among themselves". In May 2020, the wipe feature was disabled at distance by law enforcement in some units. The company initially tried to push an update in response to what was initially regarded as a bug, but the devices were struck again by malware altering lock screen passwords.

On the night of 12–13 June 2020, once EncroChat suspected the infiltration by law enforcement had occurred, users received a secret message:

Today, we had our domain seized illegally by government entities(s). They repurposed our domain to launch an attack to compromise the carbon units. ... Due to the level of sophistication of the attack and the malware code, we can no longer guarantee the security of your device. ... You are advises [sic] to power off and physically dispose your device immediately.

A few days later, an "email address long associated with EncroChat" informed Vice Motherboard that the service was shutting down permanently "following several attacks carried out by a foreign organisation that seems to originate in the UK"; Cox publicly disclosed excerpts of the email on 22 June. Europol and the National Crime Agency refused to comment at the time. The identity of the persons in charge of EncroChat has not been revealed as of 3 July 2020.

== Impact ==
=== European joint investigation team, 2020 ===
The Europol-supported JIT, code named Emma 95 in France and 26Lemont in the Netherlands, allowed the gathering in real time of millions of messages between suspects. Information was also shared with law enforcement in several countries that were not participating in the JIT, including the UK, Sweden and Norway.

The Dutch police arrested more than 100 suspects and seized more than 8 tonnes of cocaine, around 1.2 tonnes of crystal methamphetamine, 19 synthetic drug laboratories, dozens of guns and luxury cars, and around €20 million in cash. On 22 June 2020 in a property in Rotterdam, authorities found police uniforms, stolen vehicles, 25 firearms, and 25 kg (55 lb) of drugs in a different property. On 22 June 2020, the Dutch police also discovered a "torture chamber" in a warehouse near the town of Wouwse Plantage about 7 km (5 miles) east of Bergen op Zoom. The facility, which was still under construction when discovered, consisted of seven cells made out of sound-proofed shipping containers; torture tools were found including a dentist's chair, hedge trimmers, scalpels and pliers. The place was nicknamed by criminals the "treatment room" or the "ebi", in reference to Extra Beveiligde Inrichting (EBI), a Dutch maximum security prison.

EncroChat probes in Ireland left criminals scrambling for cover. €1.1 million worth of cocaine was seized in an Amsterdam flat, and €5.5 million of cannabis in a trailer in County Wexford, both belonging to Irish gangs. Prominent Irish gang boss Daniel Kinahan was reported to have fled his "safe-haven" of Dubai on 9 July 2020.

Arrests were also made in Sweden. French authorities declined to disclose information publicly about the arrests in July 2020.

=== European joint investigation against Ndrangheta, 2023 ===
In May 2023, "Operation Eureka" led to arrests of 108 people suspected of being involved with 'Ndrangheta in Italy and more than 30 arrests in Germany after 4 years of investigations and having been able to crack EncroChat and Sky ECC.

=== United Kingdom ===
Operation Venetic
- Operation name: Operation Venetic
- Scope: multinational

Participants
- Planned by: France, United Kingdom
- Initiated by: France
- Executed by: National Crime Agency
- Countries participating: United Kingdom, France
- No. of countries participating: 2

Mission
- Objective: To deploy malicious code to the Encrochat devices, and eavesdrop on criminal communications.
- Method: Network Intrusion Technique (NIT)

Results
- Arrests: 3,100
- Convictions: 1,240
- Miscellaneous results: Seized £54 million in cash, 751 kg (1655 lb) cocaine,

==== Operation Venetic ====
Operation Eternal
- Operation name: Operation Eternal
- Scope: multinational

Participants
- Planned by: France, United Kingdom
- Initiated by: France
- Executed by: U.K. Metropolitan Police Service
- Countries participating: United Kingdom, France
- No. of countries participating: 3

Results
- Suspects: 1,400
- Arrests: 942
- Convictions: 426
- Miscellaneous results: £19 Million Cash, 49 Firearms, 500 rounds of ammunition, 620kg (1400 lb) Class A drugs

Operation Venetic was a British national response initiated by the National Crime Agency (NCA). In June 2020, EncroChat had 10,000 users in the UK alone. As a result of the infiltration of the network, UK police arrested 746 individuals, including major crime bosses, intercepted two tonnes of drugs (with a street value at the time in excess of £100 million), seized £54 million in cash, as well as weapons, including submachine guns, handguns, grenades, an AK-47 assault rifle, and more than 1,800 rounds of ammunition. More than 28 million tablets of the sedative Etizolam were found in a factory in Rochester, Kent. Additionally, 354 kg (780 lb) of cocaine were seized by the Eastern unit in Essex and East Anglia, and 233 kg (514 lb) by the West Midlands unit. Police Scotland seized 164 kg (362 lb) of cocaine, £200,000 of cannabis and £750,000 in cash in several busts. In May 2020, police found two suitcases containing £1.1 million in Sheffield.

- On 24 March 2020 NCA Agent and G3 Operations Manager J. Wayne filled out the Application for a Targeted Equipment Interference Warrant Under the Investigatory Powers Act 2016 form for TEI warrant 91-TEI-0141-2020.
- On 25 March 2020 the NCA applied to their judiciary for an amendment to also scan for wi-fi networks that were adjacent to the infected Encrochat devices.
- On 26 March 2020 the TEI was granted by the Judicial Commissioner. The warrant was further approved by the NCA director-general Dame Lynne Owens QPM CBE.
- As of 8 July 2020, four people had been charged by the NCA with conspiracy to murder. British police claimed to have prevented up to 200 gangland killings, although Vice News noted that "the number of homicides linked to high level organised crime—as opposed to street gangs—in this county is relatively low". Two corrupt law enforcement officers were also arrested as a result of the operation.
- On 22 December 2020, Thomas Maher was jailed for 14 years and 8 months at Liverpool Crown Court. He had pleaded guilty to four counts of conspiracy to commit a crime at an earlier hearing. He was involved in conspiracies to smuggle about £1.5 million (€1.6m) of cocaine from the Netherlands to Ireland as well as laundering about £1 million (€1.09m) in cash between Ireland and the Netherlands. He had used two EncroChat phones, which were not recovered, using the aliases "Satirical" and "Snacker".
- In March 2022 the first murder plot convictions due to EncroChat were secured, against Paul Fontaine and Frankie Sinclair. By that time the NCA said that 2,631 people had been arrested in the UK as part of Operation Venetic; 1,384 had been charged, 260 convicted and over five and a half tons of class A drugs, 165 weapons and £75m in criminal cash had been seized.
- By 9 October 2023, Operation Venetic had led to more than 3,100 arrests, 1,240 convictions and a combined 7,938 years in prison sentences. The operation had also recovered 173 firearms, 3459 rounds of ammunition and more than 9 tonnes of class A drugs.
- In November 2023 Natalie Mottram, a former police analyst, was sentenced to almost four years imprisonment for misconduct in public office, perverting the course of justice and unauthorised access to computer material. She had told a criminal friend that police were monitoring EncroChat messages and that the police had information on him.
- On 2 February 2026 Francis Ventre, a former Barrow A.F.C. player, was jailed for nine years for playing a leading role in a conspiracy to supply cocaine and ketamine worth £479,500.

===== Warrant legality =====
The legality of the Targeted Equipment Interference (TEI) warrant (91-TEI-0141-2020) was questioned due to the unorthodox nature of the warrant as well as the legal arguments in the affidavit in application of a TEI warrant. There is nothing new in arguing the merits of obtaining the identities of the users of a system and bringing them to justice. Neither is it particularly unusual to exaggerate the number of criminals that will be arrested, or to downplay the number of innocent people that will be affected by the intrusion, however unethical that method may be. However, in this warrant the NCA essentially indicated that if the warrant wasn't granted, then the French would proceed with the operation anyway, and the NCA would be exposed as culpable as to having violated civil and criminal statutes in the United Kingdom. (see page 9) "...there is a significant risk that the NCA is encouraging an offense under the CMA, which may amount to an offence under ss. 44, 45, 46 of the Serious Crime Act 2007 (the "SCA 2007)"..." In other words, the NCA's arguments for obtaining the warrant was, "if you don't grant this, we could be prosecuted for criminally participating in the hacking of United Kingdom citizens devices." After granting the initial warrant, amendments to the initial warrant were requested on 24 March 2020 to allow for the scanning of wireless access points available to the Encrochat devices.

An Investigatory Powers Tribunal (IPT) into Operation Venetic was conducted from September 2022 to May 2023. The defence barristers accused the NCA of "Deliberately concealing" information when it applied for the EncroChat warrants. In addition to the issues surrounding the text of the TEI warrant, the defence attorneys argued that the application for a TEI warrant vs. a TI warrant was in and of itself a "serious and fundamental error" and the position was "tenuous at best". "The NCA started with the result they wanted and tried to fit that into the Investigatory Powers Act. They wanted a TEI and nothing else," a barrister acting for complainants told the court. "Their motive was understandable. They wanted to make the intercept available in court."
The Investigatory Powers Tribunal (IPT) concluded that the National Crime Agency (NCA) did not deliberately conceal information from the Judicial Commissioner when applying for the Targeted Equipment Interference (TEI) warrant. The tribunal found that the NCA's actions were lawful and that they were not wrong in seeking a TEI warrant instead of a Targeted Interception (TI) warrant. The tribunal dismissed various claims and complaints, declaring that the TEI warrant was lawfully issued and that the NCA did not fail in its duty of candor.

In a separate case arising from drug-trafficking proceedings in Germany, the Court of Justice ruled on 30 April 2024 (Case C-670/22, M.N.) on the use of EncroChat data whose transfer to Germany had been authorised by a French court. It held that a European Investigation Order seeking evidence already held by another Member State, in this case France, need not necessarily be issued by a judge and may be issued by a public prosecutor under certain conditions. It also held that national criminal courts must disregard such evidence if the person concerned cannot comment on it and it could carry preponderant weight in the findings of fact.

==== Operation Eternal ====
Operation Eternal, the London Metropolitan Police arm of the EncroChat operation, described itself as "the most significant operation the Metropolitan Police Service has ever launched against serious and organised crime". Around 1,400 EncroChat users were based in London at the time of its closure in June 2020. The Metropolitan Police seized more than £13.4 million in cash, 16 firearms, more than 500 rounds of ammunition, 620 kg (1400 lb) of Class A drugs, and arrested 171 people. As of 8 July 2020, 113 of them have been charged; 88 face charges of conspiracy to supply Class A drugs, and 16 have been charged with firearms offences.

In September 2020 nine people were arrested after raids in Brighton, Portslade, Kent and London linked to Operation Eternal. Three men were arrested in Brighton and Portslade, five men and a woman in Kent and London. They were arrested for a variety of charges, including conspiracy to supply cocaine. Police seized 10 kg (20 lb) of Class A drugs and £60,000.

By 9 October 2023, Operation Eternal had led to 942 arrests and 426 convictions with a combined prison sentences of 3,722 years. Around £19 million in cash had been seized along with more than three tonnes of class A and B drugs and 49 guns.

== Convictions ==
On 21 May 2021, Carl Stewart of Gem Street, Liverpool was sentenced to 13 years and 6 months at Liverpool Crown Court after pleading guilty to attempting to smuggle cocaine, heroin, MDMA and ketamine, as well as transferring criminal property. He had used EncroChat to transfer large amounts of class A and B drugs under the alias "ToffeeForce" (a reference to Everton F.C.). He was identified from a photo he had sent via Encrochat showing his hands holding a block of Blue Stilton. Police were able to identify him via his fingerprints in the photo.

Vincent Coggins, a boss in the Huyton Firm organised crime group, used EncroChat, and was jailed for 28 years.

In July 2024, former Gibraltar international footballer Jason Pusey was sentenced to 11 years in prison for his involvement in a large-scale drug operation, coordinating the supply of significant quantities of cocaine, ketamine, and cannabis.

== Similar products ==
- The Canada-based company Phantom Secure, which started as a legitimate firm selling modified mobile phones, provided "secure communications to high-level drug traffickers and other criminal organisation leaders" according to a 2018 FBI takedown announcement. Its CEO, Vincent Ramos, was sentenced in 2019 to a nine-year prison sentence after telling undercover agents that he created the device to help drug traffickers. Customers included members of the Sinaloa Cartel, and the FBI reportedly asked Ramos to plant a backdoor in Phantom Secure's encrypted network, which he refused to do.
- The "secure messenger" ANOM was launched after Phantom Secure was shut down, but in 2021 was revealed to be a sting operation run by law enforcement agencies. The shutdown of EncroChat helped give rise to ANOM.
- The secure mobile phone company MPC was revealed in 2019 to have been created by Scottish criminals James and Barrie Gillespie. Christopher Hughes, a former employee of the company, is wanted by Dutch police for the murder of criminal turned blogger Martin Kok in December 2016.
- Sky ECC was an encrypted chat service by Sky Global, a Canadian service provider. In March 2021, Dutch and Belgian police claimed to have accessed and decrypted the system traffic, leading to numerous arrests.
- Ennetcom was a Dutch telecom provider accused of having retailed its customised phones for €1,500 each largely for use by criminals, with traffic of the company's servers (mostly Canada-based) used for routing encrypted messages between its about 19,000 subscribers.
- Ghost was an encrypted communications platform whose alleged creator and administrator was charged by the Australian Federal Police in September 2024 as part of Operation Kraken.
- Exclu was an encrypted communications platform that Dutch police said in February 2023 they had dismantled. Searches in the Netherlands, Germany and Belgium led to 42 arrests.
