= Hassan Abbaspour =

Iranian politician

Hassan Abbaspour (Persian: حسن عباسپور, September 29, 1944 in Tehran – June 28, 1981) was an Iranian politician who served as the minister of energy from 1979 to 1981. Abbaspour was assassinated along with more than 70 members of the Islamic Republic Party in the Haft-e Tir bombing on 28 June 1981.

== See also ==
- Hafte Tir bombing
- Mahmoud Ghandi
