= Carbon unit =

A carbon unit may be:

- A carbon credit, a generic term for any tradable certificate or permit representing the right to emit one tonne of carbon dioxide or the equivalent amount of another greenhouse gas
- A name or codename for a mobile-phone-type handset used for communication in the (now closed down) EncroChat undercover communication system
