= Matrice (disambiguation) =

Matrice is an Italian commune.

Matrice may also refer to:

== Places ==
- La Matrice, Linguaglossa, Catania, Sicily, Italy; a church
- Piazza Matrice, the public square containing the church San Cristofero, Chiesa Madre, Valguarnera Caropepe, Enna, Sicily, Italy
- Matrice, Hispania, Roman Empire; the Roman settlement that eventually became Madrid, Spain; see List of national capital city name etymologies

== Products ==
- DJI Matrice, an industrial drone
- Matrice, a 1989 album by Gérard Manset

== Other uses ==
- Mother church (aka "matrice"), in Christianity
- matrice, a 19th century word for womb
- Matrice (horse), an Australian thoroughbred of the 1970s; see Leading sire in Australia
- Matrice (horse), an Australian racehorse of the 1950s, winner of the Linlithgow Stakes

== See also ==
- Matrix (disambiguation)
