= Matrix model =

Matrix model may refer to:

- a model using a matrix in mathematics
- Matrix models (physics), a simplified quantum gauge theory and related mathematical techniques used to study a wide range of topics in theoretical and mathematical physics
- Matrix theory (physics), a quantum mechanical model
- Matrix population models, a type of population model that uses matrix algebra
- Matrix management, an organizational structure

== See also ==
- Matrix (disambiguation)
- Algebraic logic
- Complete graph
- Lax pair
- String theory
