= Naoufal Fassih =

Dutch criminal convicted of attempted murder

Naoufal Fassih (born 1980 in Rotterdam) is a Dutch criminal of Moroccan (Taza) origins. He has been at the centre of a longrunning feud between two Dutch crime gangs.

== Criminal background ==
He has criminal links to Spain, Ireland and Morocco.

=== Feud ===
In March 2012 customs seized 200 to 400 kg of cocaine in Antwerp. The seizure was not announced, leading the gang in question to think they had been ripped off by rival criminals.

Fassih was associated with Gwenette Martha, who was assassinated in Amsterdam in May 2014 when 80 rounds were fired at him as he left a kebab shop.

Fassih was allegedly present at another assassination, that of Samir Bouyakhrichan, in Benahavis, near Marbella in August 2014. Dutch police believe that he was there with five others.

Bouyakhrichan was associated with another criminal called Danny Kuiters (a.k.a. Danny Daimler). One of Kuiter's enforcers was Peter Raap.

On 4 November 2015 Dutch police bugging a car heard Wafaa Balfallah, Fassih's girlfriend, counting out €8,000 in €500 notes and giving the cash to a man in Eindhoven. Dutch police believe she then flew to Dublin, from where she contacted Fassih.

The following day an attempt was made to murder Peter Raap near Amsterdam. Forty shots were fired and the victim was hit seven times, though he survived. He was sitting in his car on the outskirts of Amsterdam beside a canal when the attack happened. He managed to climb out of the car and conceal himself in the canal.

A witness got the number of the assailants' car and Dutch police arrested three men. Dutch police found a BlackBerry on one of the three where the contact details for Fassih were stored under "Buik".

== Arrest in Dublin ==
In April 2016 Gardaí were executing a search warrant on an apartment in Baggot Street that they believe belonged to the Kinahan gang when Fassih answered the door. Gardaí did not know who he was, though they suspected he was connected to organised crime. Gardaí found a fake Dutch passport, a fake Belgian ID card, three designer watches worth up to €90,000, phones, memory sticks, €12,825 in cash and £300 in sterling. He was wearing €800 trainers.

He told them he was Omar Ghazouani.

He was identified when his fingerprints were sent to Interpol. Two arrest warrants were sent - one for a fight on a Dutch street and money-laundering in the Netherlands, the second for money-laundering relating to the cash found in the apartment in Dublin with him. Messages on the phone from him criticised the gang for their failure to kill Raap.

Gardaí described him as being easy to deal with when in custody. When a third warrant, alleging complicity in the attempt on Peter Raap, he became agitated.

== Convictions ==
He was jailed in April 2018 for 18 years for his part in the attempt on the life of Peter Raap. He was the sixth person to be convicted for a role in the crime, others having received sentences from 17 to 20 years. He was convicted because he had issued instructions to kill Raap.

He was also convicted of involvement with the murder of Ali Motamed. He subcontracted the murder to hitmen in the Netherlands. Evidence seized from Ennetcom led to him being convicted of one charge of murder and one of attempted murder. Emails revealed that €130,000 was offered for the murder of Motamed, though the identity of whoever offered the money has never been established. However, on appeal this conviction was overturned in January 2025 and Fassih was found not guilty of the murder of Motamed.
