= Haft-e Tir bombing =

1981 attack on the Islamic Republican Party headquarters in Tehran, Iran

Hafte Tir bombing
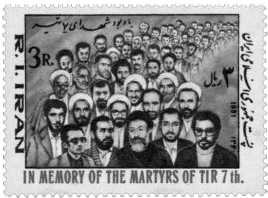
- Martyrs of 7th Tir on stamp
- Location: Tehran, Iran
- Date: 28 June 1981; 20:20 local time (UTC+3)
- Target: IRP leaders
- Attack type: Suicide bombing
- Deaths: 74

On 28 June 1981 (7 Tir 1360 in the Iranian calendar; Persian: هفت تیر, romanized: Haft-e Tir), a powerful bomb went off at the headquarters of the Islamic Republican Party (IRP) in Tehran, while a meeting of party leaders was in progress. Seventy-four leading officials of the Islamic Republic of Iran were killed, including Chief Justice Ayatollah Mohammad Beheshti, who was the second most powerful figure in the Iranian Revolution (after Ayatollah Ruhollah Khomeini).

The Iranian government first blamed SAVAK and the Iraqi regime. Two days later, on 30 June, the People's Mujahedin of Iran was accused by Khomeini of being behind the attack. The Iranian government also put blame on the United States for the bombing.

A few years afterward, a tribunal in Kermanshah sentenced four alleged "Iraqi agents" to death for their supposed role in the incident. Separately, a Tehran tribunal executed Mehdi Tafari on the same charges. By 1985, however, the head of military intelligence publicly claimed that the operation had in fact been carried out by royalist army officers.

== Bombing ==
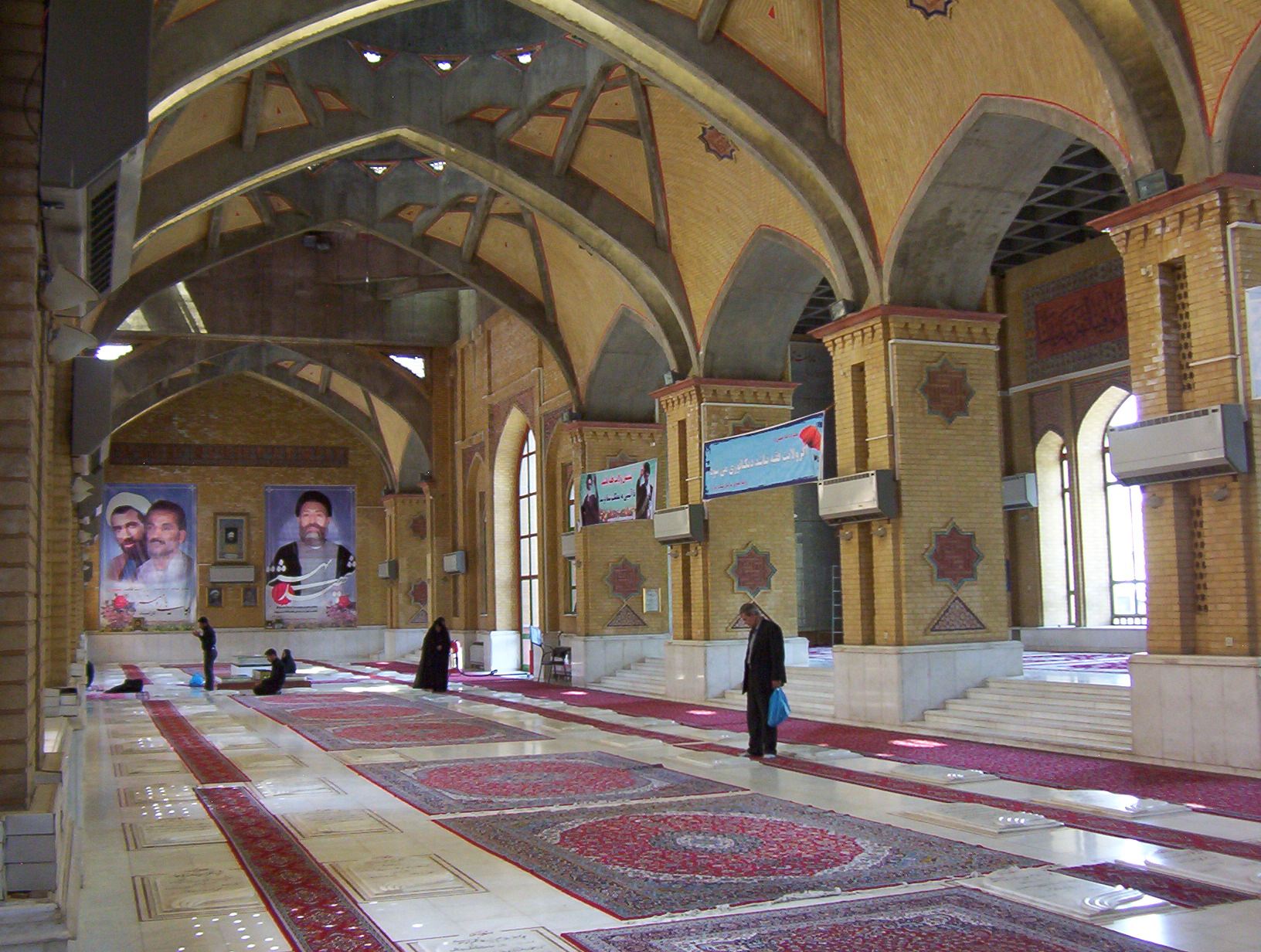
Haft-e Tir bombing victims mausoleum, designed by Mir-Hossein Mousavi

On 28 June 1981, the Haft-e Tir bombing occurred, killing the chief justice and party secretary Ayatollah Mohammad Beheshti, four cabinet ministers (health, transport, telecommunications and energy ministers), twenty-seven members of the Majlis, including the son of the deputy supreme leader Hussein-Ali Montazeri, Mohammad Montazeri, and many other government officials.

== Immediate aftermath ==
Khomeini accused the PMOI to be responsible and, according to BBC journalist Baqer Moin, the Mujahedin were "generally perceived as the culprits" for the bombing in Iran. The Mujahedin never publicly confirmed or denied any responsibility for the deed. They stated that the attack was "a natural and necessary reaction to the regime's atrocities."

== Iranian investigation and judicial proceedings ==
SAVAK and Iraq were immediately held responsible by Iranian authorities, but two days later the People's Mujahedin of Iran (MEK) was blamed. On 6 July, the bomber was finally identified as a 23-year-old man named Mohammad Reza Kolahi. Kolahi had secured a job in the building disguised as a sound engineer. Iran accused Kolahi of being a member of the MEK. But one Iranian dissident said the government did not find him having any organizational links.

Several years later, Iran executed four "Iraqi agents" for the bombing. In 1985, Iranian military intelligence stated that the bombing was not conducted by the MEK but by pro-monarchy officers in the Iranian army.

== Aftermath ==
Many scholarly sources believe the People's Mujahedin of Iran (MEK) was responsible for the bombing. Anthony Cordesman writes that this bombing, along with 1981 Iranian Prime Minister's office bombing, turned Iranian public opinion against the MEK and expanded Iranian government crackdown on the group.

According to Ervand Abrahamian, "whatever the truth, the Islamic Republic used the incident to wage war on the Left opposition in general and the Mojahedin in particular."

According to Kenneth Katzman, "there has been much speculation among academics and observers that these bombings may have actually been planned by senior IRP leaders, to rid themselves of rivals within the IRP."

The 2006 U.S. department of state Country report says that "In 1981, the MEK detonated bombs in the head office of the Islamic Republic Party and the Premier's office, killing some 70 high-ranking Iranian officials."

Assassinations of "leading officials and active supporters of the regime by the Mujahedin were to continue for the next year or two," though they failed to overthrow the government.

=== Commemoration ===
To commemorate the event several public places in Iran including major squares in Tehran and other cities are named “Haft-e Tir”.

=== Assassination of Mohammad-Reza Kolahi ===
Mohammad-Reza Kolahi, accused of being involved in the bombing, was murdered in December 2015 in front of his home in the Dutch town of Almere. Kolahi was living in the Netherlands under the false identity of Ali Motamed as a refugee, was married to an Afghan woman and had a 17-year-old son. Iran denied its involvement in the murder.

== See also ==
- Mahmoud Ghandi
- Hassan Abbaspour
