= Mats Löfving =

Swedish police officer (1961–2023)

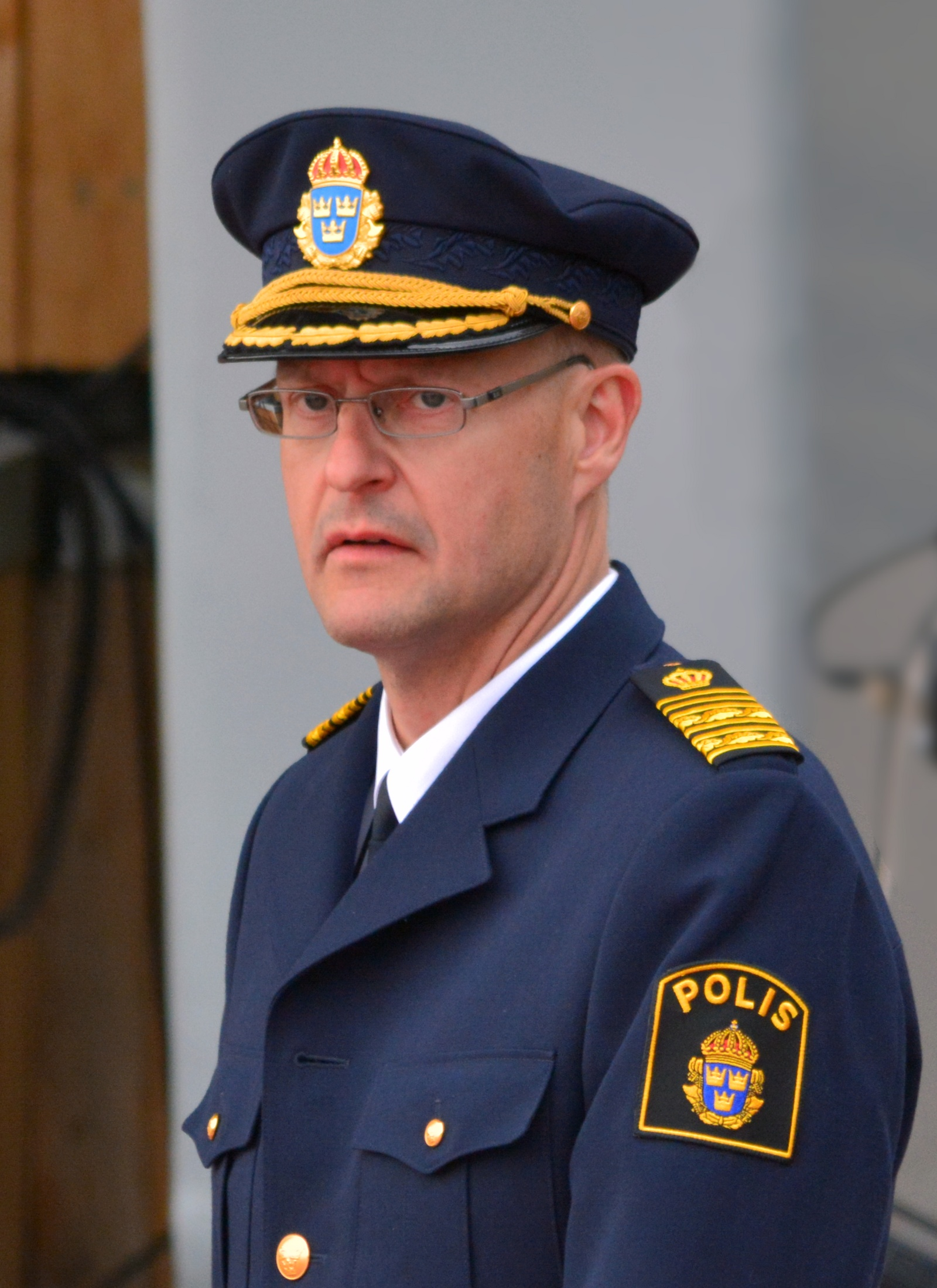
- Born: 27 May 1961; Norrköping, Sweden
- Died: 22 February 2023 (aged 61)
- Police career
- Department: Norrköping; Ministry of Justice; Östergötland County; Västra Götaland County; Swedish Police Authority
- Service years: 1981–2023

Mats Olov Löfving (27 May 1961 – 22 February 2023) was a Swedish police officer and lawyer. During his career he served as deputy director of the Swedish Police Authority, chief of police of both Östergötland and Västra Götaland, and was appointed the next regional chief of police for Stockholm County and Gotland.

== Career ==
Born in Norrköping in 1961, Löfving joined the Swedish Police Academy and graduated in 1981, serving as a law enforcement officer in his home town. In 1988, he gained a law degree, and from 1995 to 1998 was the most senior officer of the Norrköping criminal investigation department. From 1999 to 2001, he was deputy head of the police unit at the Ministry of Justice. In 2002, he was appointed deputy chief of police of the Östergötland County force and in 2004 became the chief there. With effect from 1 February 2009, he transferred to become chief of police of Västra Götaland County, commenting that he was taking on a bigger job and that it was healthy for Östergötland and himself to gain different perspectives.

In November 2014, Löfving was appointed deputy director of the Swedish Police Authority (SPA) for a four-year term of office, and he also became the first head of the Police Authority's newly formed National Operations Department. In October 2020, Löfving was appointed regional police chief for Stockholm and Gotland.

== Immigration and violence ==
Sweden has been known for its welcoming stance with regard to global refugees, but this came with increased challenges for the police. In January 2015 when he was deputy director of the SPA, Löfving responded to the 2014 mosque arson attacks in Sweden by assigning more patrols to the mosques, and by ordering greater discussion between the police and immigrant Muslim communities in Sweden. He said the SPA was cooperating with the Swedish Security Service and giving a higher priority to investigations of mosque attacks.

In November 2019, Löfving set up a police task force named Operation Hoarfrost to counter a new wave of immigrant gang violence. The stated goal was to reduce shootings and bombings, to arrest gang members, to take weapons away from gangs, and to promote public safety. He said the problem was an "exceptional situation" requiring "special methods". Prime Minister Stefan Löfven expressed approval of Löfving's new task force.

Löfving made headlines in September 2020, when he spoke out on Swedish Radio about the problem of immigrant family-based criminal gangs in Sweden, of which he said there were at least forty. He was quoted as saying that "Far from everyone wants to be a part of Swedish society" and that some families had come to Sweden "solely for the purpose of organizing and systematizing crime", bringing with them their own parallel systems of government.

The Spectator reported Löfving's Swedish Radio interview as "a bombshell". Swedish journalist Fredrik Haage remarked that, prior to Löfving's announcement, the idea that crime families were operating in Sweden was a "xenophobic conspiracy theory", but after the announcement, discussion was rising about the problem of immigrant crime. Löfven pushed back against Löfving, saying "I do not want to link crime to ethnicity".

Linda H. Staaf, head of the National Operations Department of the SPA, said that the family-based gangs in Sweden were composed of a combination of immigrants from three and four decades ago, and newly arrived immigrants who were determined to continue their criminal activities in Sweden.

== Investigation and death ==
On 1 February 2023, it was announced that Löfving had been served with a notice that he was suspected of gross misconduct in connection with having appointed Linda Staaf as head of intelligence at the National Operations Department in 2015, and for having assigned a service weapon to Staaf in 2020, as they were said to be in a relationship at the time. An investigator, Runar Viksten, reviewed these decisions on behalf of National Police Commissioner Anders Thornberg and presented a report on 22 February 2023. He concluded that in four decisions concerning Staaf Löfving had been biased (jävig), but that there had been nothing wrong with the decision to give her the job. He found that Löfving had not made incorrect decisions, but that he had a conflict of interest, and recommended that the National Police Commissioner should consider dismissing Löfving or removing him from his position.

Löfving was found dead at home on the evening of 22 February 2023, at the age of 61. As it was not certainly known what had happened, the death had initially been classified as a suspected murder and a preliminary investigation had been begun. He had committed suicide. The following day, a moment of silence was held and the flags at all police stations were flown at half-mast. At Löfving's funeral in Norrköping, a procession with mounted police and cars was held in his honour.
