= Mohammad-Reza Kolahi =

Iranian bombing suspect (1958 – 2015)

Mohammad-Reza Kolahi Samadi
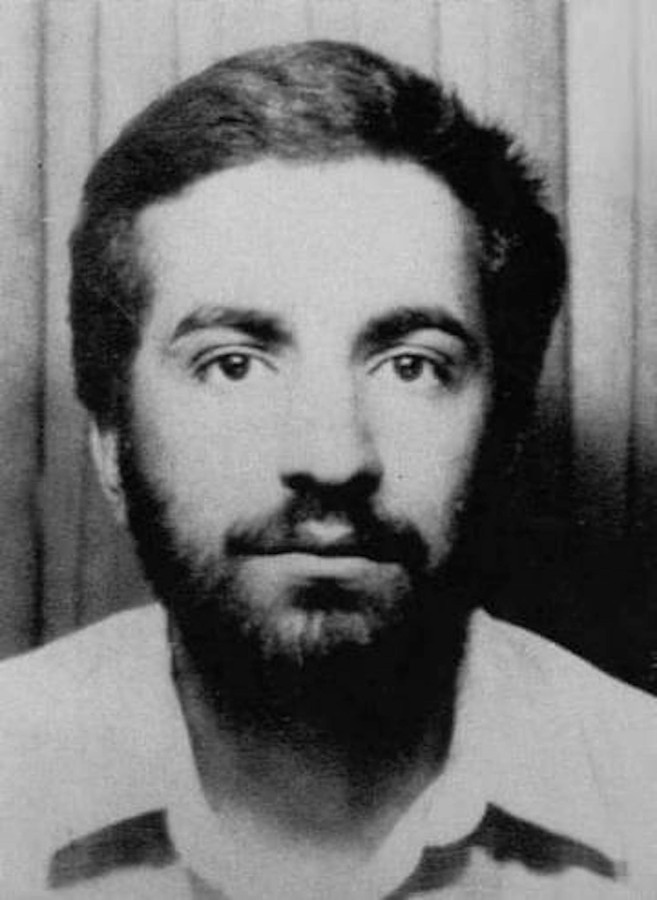
- Kolahi in 1981
- Born: Mohammad-Reza Kolahi Samadi; 1958; Iran
- Died: 15 December 2015 (aged 56–57); Almere, Netherlands
- Cause of death: Assassination
- Other name: Ali Mo’tamed
- Education: Iran University of Science and Technology (dropped out)
- Political party: People's Mujahedin (1979–1981)
- Military career
- Branch: Revolutionary Committees

Mohammad-Reza Kolahi (Persian: محمدرضا کلاهی; 1958 – 15 December 2015) was a member of the People's Mujahedin of Iran (MEK) who, according to Iranian authorities, was suspected of planting a bomb at the headquarters of the Islamic Republican Party (IRP) that killed more than 70 officials on 28 June 1981. Kolahi was assassinated on 15 December 2015. The Islamic Republic of Iran is believed to have been behind the assassination. He reportedly was a freshman student of electrical engineering who worked as an electrician in the IRP.

== Hafte Tir bombing allegations ==
On 28 June 1981, two bombs were detonated at the IRP headquarters in Tehran, killing Chief Justice Mohammad Beheshti and some seventy Iranian officials. The Islamic Republic of Iran first blamed SAVAK and the Iraqi regime. Two days later, Ruhollah Khomeini accused MEK. According to the Islamic Republic of Iran, Kolahi was suspected of planting the bombs as he left the building to "buy ice creams" ten minutes before the detonations. A few years later, a Kermanshah tribunal sentenced to death four "Iraqi agents" for the incident. Another tribunal in Tehran sentenced to death Mehdi Tafari for the same incident. In 1985, the head of military intelligence informed the press that the bombing had been the work of royalist army officers. Iran's security forces blamed the United States and "international mercenaries". According to Ervand Abrahamian, "whatever the truth, the Islamic Republic used the incident to wage war on the Left opposition in general and the Mojahedin in particular."

== Assassination ==
In 2018, it was revealed that Kolahi had been living in the Netherlands as a refugee under the false identity of Ali Motamed (Persian: علی معتمد) and had been murdered in December 2015. Kolahi was married to an Afghan woman and had a 17-year-old son. He had avoided events organised by his wife's family for fear of images of his face emerging on social media.

According to Het Parool, two men suspected of killing Kolahi were identified as 28-year-old Anouar Aoulad-Buochea and 35-year-old Moreo Menso, “Both suspects have a criminal record and come from the same Bijlmer neighborhood of Amsterdam.” Several sources accused the Iranian government of being behind the assassination.

Naoufal Fassih was also convicted of one charge of murder and one of attempted murder in relation to the case based on evidence seized from Ennetcom. He subcontracted the murder to hitmen in the Netherlands. Emails revealed that €130,000 was offered for the murder of Motamed, though the identity of whoever offered the money has never been established.
