= William Davis (judge) =

British High Court judge (1954–2025)

The Right Honourable Lord Justice Davis
- Royal coat of arms of the United Kingdom

Lord Justice of Appeal
- In office 1 October 2021 – 7 June 2025
- Monarchs: Elizabeth II; Charles III

Judge of the High Court
- In office 1 May 2014 – 30 September 2021

Personal details
- Born: 20 June 1954
- Died: 7 June 2025 (aged 70)
- Education: Queen Mary University of London

Sir William Easthope Davis (20 June 1954 – 7 June 2025), styled The Rt Hon Lord Justice William Davis, was a judge of the Court of Appeal of England and Wales.

== Life and career ==
Davis was educated at Wyggeston Grammar School for Boys and Queen Mary University of London.

He was called to the bar at Inner Temple in 1975.

On 1 May 2014, he was made a judge of the High Court of Justice (Queen's Bench Division). He was promoted to the Court of Appeal on 1 October 2021.

Davis was made Chairman of the Sentencing Council which tried to introduce controversial guidance to judges on sentencing which was blocked by the Lord Chancellor on behalf of the government but then withdrew them when presented with emergency legislation.

Davis died from respiratory failure on 7 June 2025, at the age of 70.

== Awards and honours ==
In 2014 Davis was awarded an honorary Doctor of Law from Aston University, for services to the legal professional and legal education.

He was sworn of the Privy Council on 15 December 2021.

== See also ==
- Mark Fellows
