= Phantom Secure =

Canadian encrypted mobile phone provider used by criminal organizations

- Industry: Telecommunications
- Founder: Vincent Ramos
- Fate: Shut down following law enforcement operation
- Headquarters: Richmond, British Columbia, Canada
- Key people: Vincent Ramos (CEO)
- Products: Encrypted mobile phones
- Website: phantomsecure.com at the Wayback Machine (archived 2017-03-30)

Phantom Secure was a Canadian company that provided modified, encrypted mobile phones designed for secure communications. The devices featured a remotely operated kill switch and were marketed as tools for privacy and security. Law enforcement agencies later determined that the company’s services were primarily used by organized crime groups. Following the company’s shutdown in 2018, many of its users migrated to other encrypted networks such as ANOM, which was later revealed to be an FBI honeypot.

== History ==
Phantom Secure was founded in Canada and became known for modifying BlackBerry and Android devices to remove features such as GPS, camera, and internet browsing. The company installed custom encryption software that routed messages through servers located in countries with strict privacy laws. Its products were advertised as providing high-level anonymity and security.

== Law enforcement operations ==
Arrest and conviction of Vincent Ramos

Vincent Ramos, the founder and CEO of Phantom Secure, was arrested on 7 March 2018 at a restaurant in Bellingham, Washington. At the time, he resided in Richmond, British Columbia. According to the FBI, Phantom Secure provided "secure communications to high-level drug traffickers and other organized crime leaders". Ramos was accused of knowingly selling encrypted devices to criminal organizations, including the Sinaloa Cartel.

In 2019, Ramos pleaded guilty to a charge under the RICO and received a nine-year U.S. federal prison sentence. A separate drug-trafficking conspiracy charge was dropped as part of a plea agreement. During the investigation, the FBI reportedly asked Ramos to install a backdoor into Phantom Secure’s network, which he declined to do. Ramos was released from prison in November 2024 and deported to Canada.

Connection to Cameron Ortis

In September 2019, the Royal Canadian Mounted Police (RCMP) arrested Cameron Ortis, then Director General of the RCMP’s National Intelligence Coordination Centre. Ortis had joined the RCMP in 2007 after completing a PhD at the University of British Columbia. Media reports linked his arrest to the Phantom Secure investigation.

Ortis was charged under the Security of Information Act and the Criminal Code with leaking classified information, including providing "special operational information" in 2015 to an individual identified as "V.R.", believed to be Vincent Ramos. In early 2024, Ortis was sentenced to 14 years in prison for leaking national security secrets.

== Aftermath ==
After Phantom Secure was dismantled, many of its users turned to other encrypted communication services. One such service, ANOM, was secretly created and operated by the FBI in collaboration with other international agencies. The operation led to hundreds of arrests worldwide.

== See also ==
- EncroChat
- ANOM sting operation
