= Mark Fellows (hitman) =

Convicted British hitman

- Born: 5 September 1980 (age 46)

Mark Fellows (nicknamed "The Iceman"; born 5 September 1980) is a British hitman convicted of the murders of John Kinsella and Paul Massey, rival enforcers to the Anti A Team criminal network. At the time of his conviction he was one of only 70 prisoners sentenced to a whole life term.

== Background ==
Fellows lived in Warrington but was originally from Salford.

== Murders ==
=== Paul Massey murder ===
On 26 July 2015, Massey was shot dead outside his home on Manchester Road, Clifton, by a lone gunman. The killer was reported to have been wearing military style fatigues and carried a weapon "similar to a sub machine gun". Greater Manchester Police offered a £50,000 reward for information pertaining to the killing.

=== John Kinsella murder ===
Kinsella was shot dead on 5 May 2018 near St Helens Linkway in Rainhill as he walked with his pregnant partner Wendy Owen. The killers used encrypted EncroChat handsets to co-ordinate the murder.

== Trial ==
The trial lasted eight weeks, with heavily armed police officers in attendance. His fellow criminal Steven Boyle was also on trial. Boyle was described as Fellows's "brother in arms" and accused of acting as a spotter, watching the victims and providing assistance to the gunman.

During the trial, evidence from a Garmin fitness watch with a GPS function found in Fellows's house was used to show that he had travelled from his home to a field opposite Massey's home.

== Conviction ==
Fellows was found guilty of the murders of both Massey and Kinsella, but found not guilty of the attempted murder of Owen. Mr Justice William Davis sentenced him to a whole-life term. Boyle was convicted of the murder of Kinsella, but cleared of the murder of Massey and the attempted murder of Owen.

== Assault in prison ==
In February 2019 Fellows was seriously injured when he was slashed by another prisoner with a weapon believed to have been made from a razor blade. He was attacked in HM Prison Whitemoor and airlifted to hospital.

== Murder of Kyle Bevan ==
On 7 November 2025, Fellows, along with two other prisoners, was charged with murder after the death of convicted murderer, Kyle Bevan, following an incident at HM Prison Wakefield. On 18 June 2026, Fellows and the two other prisoners were found guilty of the murder of Bevan.

== Appeal of sentence ==
He appealed against his sentence on the grounds that it was "excessive", but in July 2019 the appeal was turned down.
