= Matrix =

Matrix (pl.: matrices or matrixes) or MATRIX may refer to:

== Science and mathematics ==
- Matrix (mathematics), a rectangular array of numbers, symbols or expressions
- Matrix (logic), part of a formula in prenex normal form
- Matrix (biology), the material between cells within a eukaryotic organism
- Matrix (chemical analysis), the non-analyte components of a sample
- Matrix (geology), the fine-grained material in which larger objects are embedded
- Matrix (composite), the constituent of a composite material
- Hair matrix, produces hair
- Nail matrix, part of the nail in anatomy

== Technology ==
- Matrix (mass spectrometry), a compound that promotes the formation of ions
- Matrix (numismatics), a tool used in coin manufacturing
- A flong or mat, a paper mould made from an impression of printing type
- Matrix (printing), a mould for casting letters
- Matrix (protocol), an open standard for real-time communication software
- Matrix (record production), or master, a disc used in the production of phonograph records
  - Matrix number, of a gramophone record
- Diode matrix, a two-dimensional grid of intersecting diodes
- Display matrix, picture elements of an information display arranged as a matrix
- Keyboard matrix circuit, a wire grid for determining which key has been pressed on a keyboard
- Variable-message sign, known as matrix signs in the UK
- Matrix app, a former app and communications network closed by police in December 2024

== Arts and entertainment ==
=== Fictional entities ===
- Matrix (comics), two comic book characters
- Matrix (Doctor Who), a computer system on the planet Gallifrey
- Matrix, a character from the Canadian animated TV series ReBoot
- Matrix (Neuromancer), a virtual-reality dataspace from the novel
- John Matrix, hero of the 1985 film Commando
- Irving Joshua Matrix, a fictitious creation of Martin Gardner

=== Film and television ===
- Matrix (TV series), a 1993 Canadian fantasy series
- The Matrix, a 1999 science fiction action film
  - The Matrix (franchise), an American media franchise developed from the film
  - "The Matrix", a fictional setting, a virtual reality environment, within the franchise
- Matrix (talk show), a 2005–2012 Italian news and talk show
- Matrix of Leadership, in the Transformers franchise

=== Games ===
- The Matrix: Path of Neo, a 2005 action-adventure video game
- The Matrix Online, a 2005 online multiplayer video game
- The Matrix, a world-wide virtual reality data network in the role playing game Shadowrun

=== Literature ===
- Matrix, a 1969 novel by John Rankine, writing as Douglas R. Mason
- Matrix (Perry and Tucker novel), a 1998 Doctor Who novel by Robert Perry and Mike Tucker
- Matrix: Echoes of Growing Up West, a 2010 collection of poems by Michael R. Collings
- Matrix (Groff novel), 2021, by Lauren Groff
- Matrix (journal), on printing, published by Whittington Press
- The Matrix (magazine), published by the Association for Women in Communications
- The Matrix, a 1920 novel by Maria Thompson Daviess
- The Matrix, a 1981 novel by Jo Bannister
- The Matrix, a 1994 novel by Denis MacEoin, writing as Jonathan Aycliffe
- The Matrix, a 2004 non-fiction book about the 1999 film by Joshua Clover

=== Music ===
- Matrix (band), an American jazz-fusion ensemble
- Matrix (musician), a British producer and DJ
- Matrix (music), an element in musical variations that remains unchanged
- matrix, a 2000 album by Ryoji Ikeda
- Matrix (EP), by B.A.P, 2015
- "Matrix", a song by Chick Corea from the 1968 album Now He Sings, Now He Sobs
- "Matrix", a song by Kate Pierson from the 2015 album Guitars and Microphones
- The Matrix (production team), an American-British production team
  - The Matrix (album), 2009
- "The Matrix", a Song by Mother Mother from the 2024 album Grief Chapter

== Businesses and organisations ==
- Matrix management, an organizational structure in which some individuals report to more than one supervisor or leader
- Matrix Business Technologies or Matrix Telecom, Inc., an American telecommunications firm
- Matrix Chambers, a set of barristers' chambers in London and Geneva
- Matrix Feminist Design Co-operative, a London-based architectural collective, 1980–1994
- Matrix Games, an American video game publisher
- Matrix Partners, an American private equity investment firm
- Matrix Software, or Matrix Corporation, a Japanese video game developer
- Matrix (club), a Berlin nightclub opened in 1996
- The Matrix (club), a San Francisco nightclub, 1965–1972
- The Matrix Theatre Company, in Los Angeles, California, US
- Matrix Concepts, a Malaysian property developer

== People ==
- David Krejčí (born 1986), Czech ice hockey player nicknamed "The Matrix"
- Shawn Marion (born 1978), American basketball player nicknamed "The Matrix"
- Marco Materazzi (born 1973), Italian footballer nicknamed "Matrix"

== Transportation ==
- Hyundai Matrix, a multi-purpose road vehicle
- Toyota Matrix, a compact hatchback car
- PA-46R-350T Matrix, a version of the Piper PA-46 aircraft

== Other uses ==
- Multistate Anti-Terrorism Information Exchange (MATRIX), an American data mining system
- Matrix (magic trick), a close-up magic coin and card trick
- Matrix, a brand name of veterinary progestin altrenogest
- Oberheim Matrix synthesizers, music keyboards
- Castle Matrix, near Rathkeale, County Limerick, Ireland

== See also ==
- Matrice (disambiguation)
