= Valguarnera Caropepe =

Valguarnera Caropepe Carrapipi (Sicilian)
- Comune
- Comune di Valguarnera Caropepe
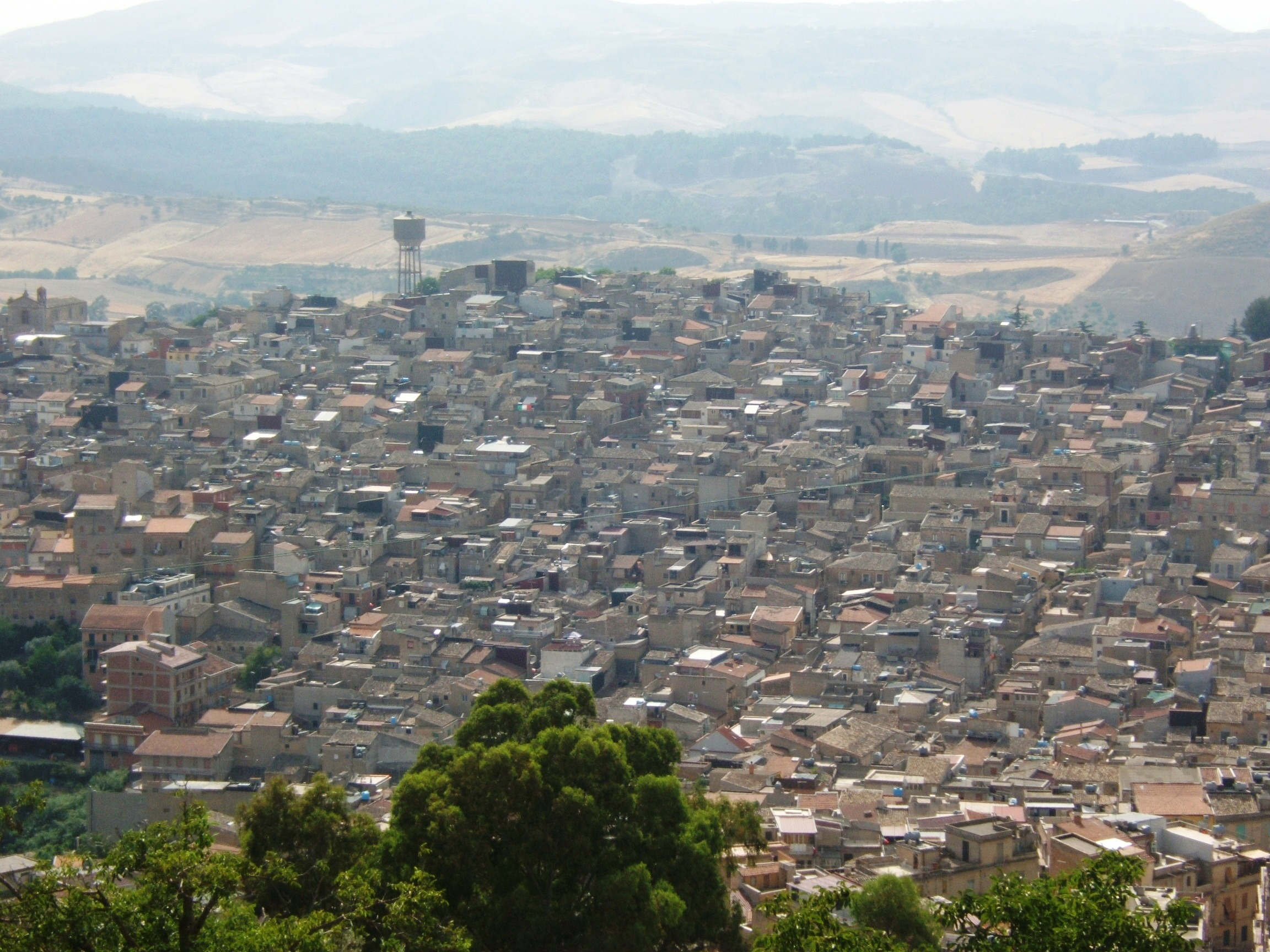
- View of Valguarnera Caropepe

- Location within Italy Location within Sicily
- Coordinates: 37°30′N 14°23′E
- Country: Italy
- Region: Sicily
- Province: Enna (EN)

Government
  - Mayor: Francesca Draià

Area
  - Total: 9.41 km^{2} (3.63 sq mi)
- Elevation: 590 m (1,940 ft)

Population (2026)
  - Total: 6,743
  - Density: 717/km^{2} (1,860/sq mi)
- Demonym: Carrapipani or Valguarneresi
- Time zone: UTC+1 (CET)
  - Summer (DST): UTC+2 (CEST)
- Postal code: 94019
- Dialing code: 0935
- Patron saint: St. Christopher
- Website: Official website

Valguarnera Caropepe (Italian pronunciation: [valɡwarˈnɛːra karoˈpeːpe]; Sicilian: Carrapipi) is a town and comune (municipality) in Province of Enna in the autonomous island region of Sicily in southern Italy, located about 10 kilometres (6.2 mi) southeast of Enna and 110 kilometres (68 mi) southeast of Palermo. It has 6,743 inhabitants.

Valguarnera Caropepe stands at an elevation of 590 metres (1,940 ft) above sea level in a hilly area of the province, and borders the municipalities of Assoro, Enna, and Piazza Armerina.

== History ==
Relics dating from between the 7th century BC and the 14th century AD have been unearthed in the archaeological area of Rossomanno, in the town surroundings.

Valguarnera Caropepe was founded in 1628 by Francesco Valguarnera, and saw remarkable growth during the 19th century associated with the thriving sulfur mining industry in the area.

== Demographics ==
As of 2026, the population is 6,743, of which 47.4% are males, and 52.6% are females. Minors make up 15.2% of the population, and seniors make up 26.8%.

Historical population

Year	Pop.	±%
1861	9,551	—
1871	9,470	−0.8%
1881	11,520	+21.6%
1901	14,051	+22.0%
1911	15,915	+13.3%
1921	17,995	+13.1%
1931	16,778	−6.8%
1936	13,696	−18.4%

Year	Pop.	±%
1951	15,592	+13.8%
1961	13,829	−11.3%
1971	11,167	−19.2%
1981	10,252	−8.2%
1991	9,171	−10.5%
2001	8,649	−5.7%
2011	8,182	−5.4%
2021	7,082	−13.4%

Source: ISTAT

=== Immigration ===
As of 2025, immigrants make up 5.3% of the population. The 5 largest foreign countries of birth are Germany, Switzerland, France, Romania, and Belgium.

== Sights ==
The Chiesa Madre dedicated to Saint Christopher and the 18th century Palazzo del Municipio (the Town Hall), in the precincts of the former Monte Frumentario, are the most attractive buildings.
