= John Kinsella (criminal) =

British gang member

John Kinsella was a British criminal from Everton, Liverpool. He was shot dead in May 2018 by killers using encrypted EncroChat handsets to co-ordinate the murder.

== Early life ==
He was an expert in judo and jujutsu, and was originally from Everton.

He was a criminal associate of gangster Paul Massey and a pallbearer at his funeral.

== Criminal history ==
In 1991, Kinsella was sentenced at Liverpool Crown Court to nine years' imprisonment for attempted robbery and carrying a firearm with intent to commit an offence.

In 2006, he was involved in a robbery in Grantham, Lincolnshire, and was put on trial for it in 2008. During the trial, the jury was read a letter from the father of Steven Gerrard saying that Kinsella had stopped his son from being threatened by a criminal, George Bromley Jnr, known as "The Psycho" in 2001. When, during the trial, Kinsella was allowed into the court grounds during a lunch break, he absconded. He was convicted in his absence and sentenced to 14 years. He was subsequently arrested in February 2009.

Kinsella's death was the result of a gang feud begun in 2015 between two rival criminal organisations in Salford. One gang, headed by Michael Carroll, had Mark Fellows and Steven Boyle as members. The rival gang, said to be headed by Stephen Britton, called itself "the A-team". Kinsella and Massey were associated with the latter gang.

== Death ==
Kinsella was shot dead on 5 May 2018 near St Helens Linkway in Rainhill by Mark Fellows.

Fellows was found guilty of the murders of both Kinsella and Massey in January 2019. Stephen Boyle was convicted of murder for his part of acting as a "spotter" in the murder of John Kinsella.

It was later revealed during the investigation that the murder of Kinsella was organised by means of EncroChat devices.
