= Smartphone kill switch =

Software-based security feature

A smartphone kill switch is a software-based security feature that allows a smartphone's owner to remotely render it inoperable if it is lost or stolen, thereby deterring theft. There have been a number of initiatives to legally require kill switches on smartphones.

Smartphones have high resale value, and are therefore often the target of theft, with thieves selling them to cartels for resale. A kill switch can deter theft by making devices worthless.

== Legal requirements ==
In the United States, Minnesota was the first state to pass a bill requiring smartphones to have such a feature, and California was the first to require that the feature be turned on by default. The California law requires the kill switch to be resistant to reinstallation of the phone's operating system. The CTIA initially resisted the legislation, fearing that it would make phones easier to hack, but later supported kill switches. There is evidence that this legislation has been effective, with smartphone theft declining by 50% between 2013 and 2017 in San Francisco.

Secure Our Smartphones (S.O.S.), a New York State and San Francisco initiative started by New York State Attorney General Eric Schneiderman and San Francisco District Attorney George Gascón. The initiative is co-chaired by Schneiderman, Gascón and Boris Johnson, and has 105 members.

== Examples ==
An Android phone signed into a Google account can be remotely locked and erased via Google's Find Hub service, as long as it is connected to the Internet. To prevent this, a thief must sign the device out of Google before the owner locks or erases it. iPhones have a similar service.

== See also ==
- International Mobile Equipment Identity
- Kill pill
