= Linda Staaf =

Swedish author and police officer (born 1976)

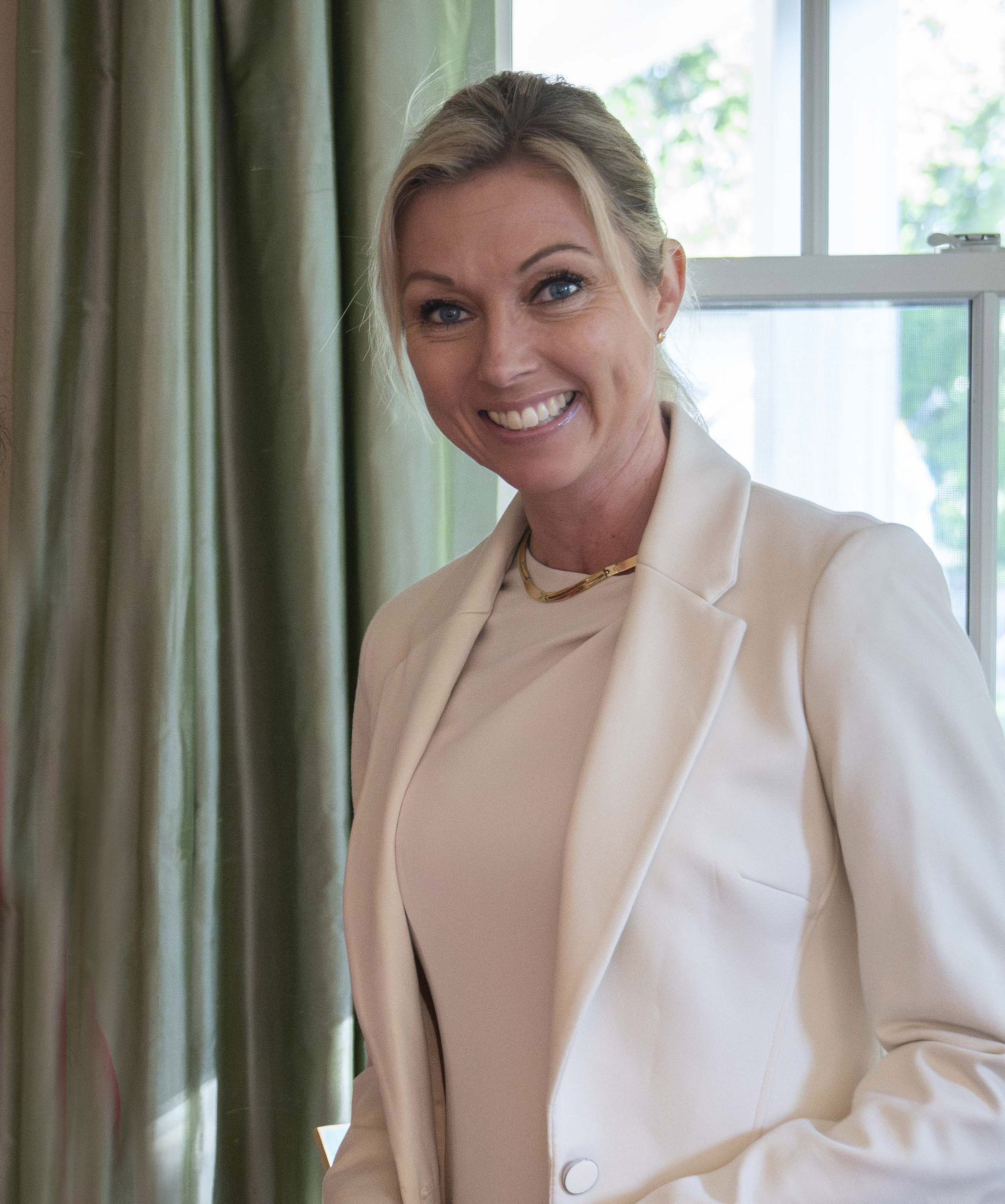
- Linda Staaf in 2024
- Born: Linda Hansson Staaf; 1976 (age 49–50); Östersund, Sweden

Linda Hansson Staaf (née Hansson; born 1976) is a Swedish author, and between 2015 and 31 December 2022 the intelligence chief at the National Operations Department (NOA).

== Biography ==
Staaf grew up in Östersund and studied economy and has a Master of Laws from Stockholm University. In 2006, she started working within the police departments as an accountant, she later became the boss of the economic department of the organisation. Staaf does not have an official education as a police but got a degree during management training. Between 2015 and December 2022, Staaf was the intelligence chief at the National Operations Department (NOA) In January 2023, Staaf started working at the Department of Justice. Since November 2023, she is working as the Swedish leader of Europol.

Staaf and her boss Mats Löfving started a relationship; Staaf's job and her credentials during her short career as a police officer were then questioned. Löfving having assigned a service weapon to Staaf in 2020. An investigator, Runar Viksten, reviewed these decisions on behalf of Anders Thornberg and presented a report on 22 February 2023. He concluded that in four decisions concerning Staaf Löfving had been biased (jävig). It should be noted however that Löfving always denied ever having an intimate relationship with Staaf, claiming that he had rejected attempts from Staaf to initiate such a relationship with him. The allegations and investigations finally lead up to Löfving ending his own life. Only two months later Staaf was once again in a relationship, this time with the Swedish chief of defence, General Micael Bydén. Staaf and Bydén also started a private business for which Bydén received criticism for conflicting interest with Bydén's job as Swedish chief of defence.

In 2018, Staaf debuted as an author with the book Ulv i fårakläder. In 2023, her second book was published called Allt är inte guld. Both books have its stories taking place in Jämtland.

== Bibliography ==
- 2018 – Ulv i fårakläder: kriminalroman. Östersund: Jengel Förlag. ISBN 9789187309847
- 2023 – Allt är inte guld. [Malmö]: Word Audio Publishing Intl. AB. ISBN 9789180005432
