= Martin Kok =

Dutch criminal turned blogger (1967–2016)

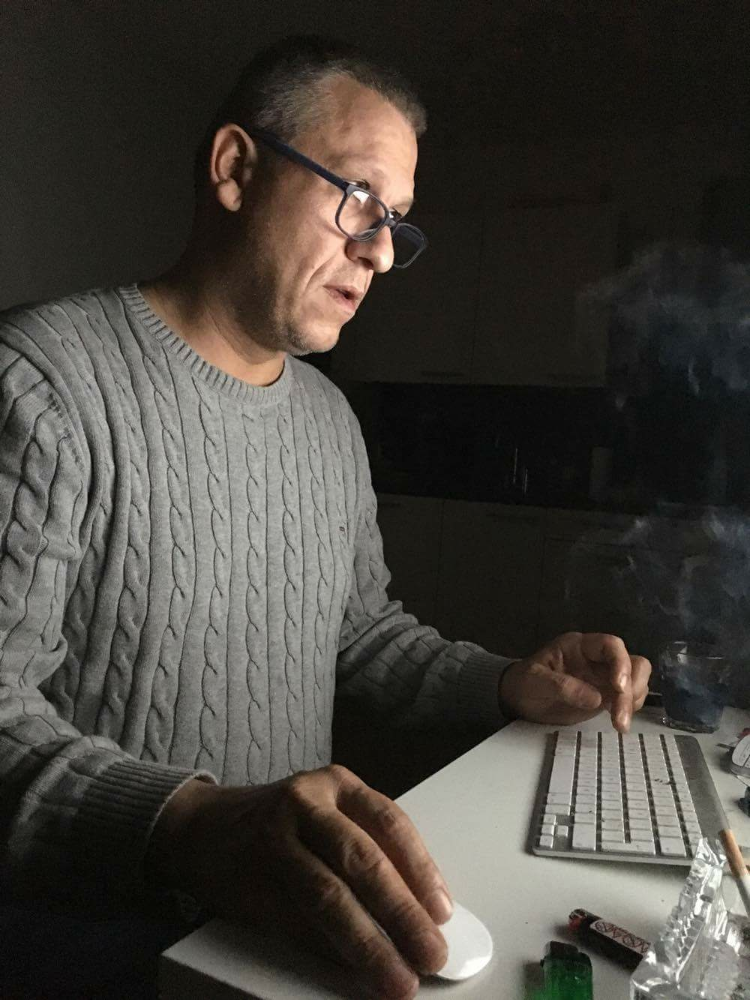
- Born: 25 June 1967; Edam, Netherlands
- Died: 8 December 2016 (aged 49); Laren, Netherlands

Martin Kok (25 June 1967 – 8 December 2016) was a Dutch criminal turned blogger.

== Early life ==
He grew up in Volendam and as a teenager sold eels along with his father and brother, dressed in traditional Volendammer dracht of red shirt, baggy black pants, and clogs. He did not enjoy it, but started selling eels in bars frequented by criminals and then moved into cocaine dealing. He was nicknamed "the Stutterer" due to a speech disorder.

== Criminal career ==
In 1988 he shot at, and missed, a former schoolmate who had cut into his business. Several months later he fought with a rival, hitting him with a barstool. The rival died of his injuries the following day and Kok was sentenced to five years in prison. During this imprisonment he befriended Dutch major criminal Willem Holleeder, who was in prison for the kidnapping of Freddy Heineken. He also befriended Cor van Hout, an accomplice of Holleeder in the kidnapping.

On release from prison he murdered the boyfriend of a former partner. He also expanded his business into prostitution.

== Blogging ==
He started a crime blog called "Vlinderscrime" (vlinder being the Dutch word for "butterfly") in February 2015. He had many contacts in the criminal world, both in and outside of jail. He reported on criminals from many backgrounds, often giving full names, in contrast to the Dutch media etiquette of only reporting criminals by their first name and first initial of the last name.

He enjoyed his newfound fame and would often taunt other criminals. He was sponsored by and ran adverts for MPC, a company that provided encrypted phones to criminals.

== Assassination attempts ==
Someone tried to shoot him while he was at home in 2015, but failed, leaving bullet holes in his car. In 2016 an explosive device was found under his car.

== Assassination ==
On 8 December 2016 he was walking with another man in Amsterdam when CCTV showed someone running up behind him outside the Citizen M hotel and pointing a gun at him. It is not clear if the gun jammed or if the shooter lost nerve. The target seemed to be unaware of the attempt on his life. Later that evening, outside a sex club in Laren, a second attempt was made, which succeeded.

He was buried in Vredenhof Cemetery.

=== Aftermath ===
The murder was linked to a Scottish criminal organisation by Scottish police, who had investigated his murder in connection to Operation Escalade. A European Arrest Warrant was issued for Christopher Hughes in relation to the murder. He was faced with charges of concealing money and supplying encrypted devices to others (including Kok), a second charge relating to the supply of cocaine and a final charge in relation to the murder of Kok. In April 2022, Hughes was convicted at the High Court in Stirling, Scotland, and jailed for at least 25 years.

== See also ==
- Marengo trial
