= Chiesa Madre, Valguarnera Caropepe =

Roman Catholic church in Sicily, Italy

Coordinates: 37.49583°N 14.38745°E

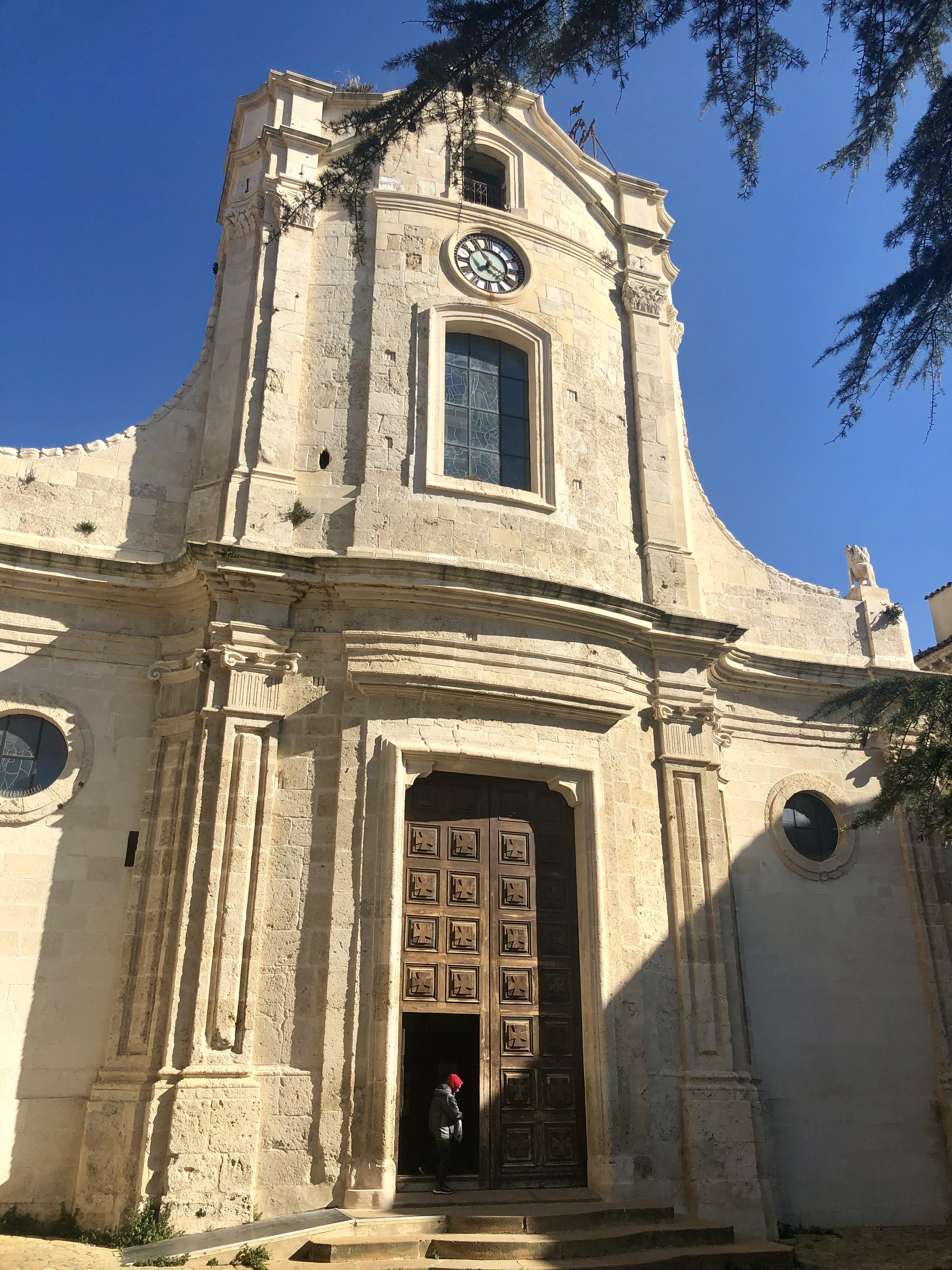
Mother Church of Valguarnera Caropepe.

San Cristofero is the Roman Catholic "mother church" (chiesa madre or duomo) in Piazza Matrice in the town center of Valguarnera Caropepe, located on 70 Via Roma in the province of Enna, region of Sicily, Italy. It is dedicated to St Christopher Martyr.

== History and description ==
The church was begun in 1626, but completion was delayed for centuries, not finished till the end of the 19th century. The church has a white stone facade with a convex central second story.

One of the altars contains a large wooden statue of St Christopher, depicted in his traditional role of ferrying the child Christ across a stream. Other altars are dedicated to the Holy Sacrament; to the Crucifixion; to the Virgin of the Annunciation, the Madonna of the Carmel, of the Raggi, and of the Rosary; to the souls in purgatory; and to the saints Joseph, Lucy, Francis of Paola.

Among the altarpieces are a canvases depicting the Baptism of Christ, St Peter and St Paul by Mario Barberis. The Via Crucis scenes (1962) were made by Clara Barberis.
