= Jason Pusey =

Gibraltarian footballer

Personal information
- Full name: Jason Lee Pusey
- Date of birth: 18 February 1989 (age 37)
- Place of birth: Gibraltar
- Position: Defender

Youth career
- 2005–2007: Atlético Madrid

Senior career*
Years	Team	Apps	(Gls)
2006–2007	Atlético Madrid C		
2007–2008	Cádiz B		
2008–2010	Atlético Zabal		
2012–2013	Lions Gibraltar		
2013–2014	Glacis United	11	(0)
2014–2016	Manchester 62	7	(0)
2016–2017	Gibraltar United	23	(0)
2017–2018	Lincoln Red Imps	1	(0)
2018	→ Gibraltar Phoenix (loan)	16	(1)
2018–2019	Gibraltar Phoenix	6	(0)
2019	Europa	1	(0)
2020	Europa Point	4	(1)
2021–2022	Lions Gibraltar	4	(0)
2022–2023	South Cave United	23	(3)

International career
2015	Gibraltar development squad	4	(0)
2017	Gibraltar	4	(0)
- * Club domestic league appearances and goals as of 21:06, 22 February 2024 (UTC)

Jason Lee Pusey (born 18 February 1989) is a Gibraltarian former footballer. Beginning his career in the famed youth set up at Atlético Madrid, Pusey went on to play in Spain and Gibraltar, as well as earning 4 caps for his national side. His final club was East Riding County League side South Cave United, with whom he played for the 2022–23 season.

In July 2024, Pusey was sentenced to 11 years and three months in prison after being convicted of supplying cocaine and cannabis.

== Club career ==
=== Early career ===
Pusey began his career at Atlético Madrid, spending 2 years at the top level of the club's youth team as well as turning out for the C team. Following his release from the club in 2007, he spent a year playing for Cádiz B followed by two seasons at Atlético Zabal. Pusey left Zabal in 2010 to take a break from football and study in the UK, returning to his native Gibraltar in 2012 to sign for Lions Gibraltar. Pusey was a regular in the first team at Lions but could not prevent the club finishing 5th of 6 teams, finishing above Glacis United on goal difference.

=== Return to Gibraltar ===
After Gibraltar was admitted to UEFA in 2013, the Gibraltar Premier Division expanded to 8 teams, and in this new format Pusey left Lions to play for Glacis United. Again, Pusey played a central role in defence as Glacis finished 5th in the table, but the summer saw him move clubs once again, this time to the previous season's runners up Manchester 62. Here he saw first team chances diminish, with only 7 appearances over two disappointing seasons at the club before a move to Gibraltar United in summer 2016. Here, he saw his career get back on track, with 23 games over the course of the season helping Gibraltar United avoid relegation, and attracting the attention of national team coach Jeff Wood. His performances then attracted the attention of Lincoln Red Imps, and he joined the Gibraltar football giants in the summer of 2017.

While he was named on the bench for Lincoln's opening qualifiers for the Europa League, he didn't see any action until he appeared in the Pepe Reyes Cup against Europa, picking up his first silverware as Lincoln won 5–3 on penalties. The consistency of Roy Chipolina and Ryan Casciaro at the heart of the Lincoln defence saw opportunities limited, however, with a 20 minute cameo against former club Glacis United on 27 September being his only action for the first team. In an effort to gain more first team football and remain in contention for the national team, Pusey went out on loan in January 2018 to Gibraltar Phoenix. Although he missed Phoenix's first game after the winter break against his parent club, he made his debut on 16 February 2018, again against Glacis United. He played the full 90 minutes in a 1–0 victory. At the end of the season, he was released by his parent club. He joined Gibraltar Phoenix permanently in the summer, making his debut as club captain on 15 August 2018 against Lynx. After a season plagued by injury, he joined Europa on 13 June 2019. However, he left the club mid-way through the season without playing a single first team game, joining Europa Point as a free agent at the end of January 2020. He made his debut on 30 January against Glacis United. Although originally set to continue as vice-captain for the next season, Pusey terminated his contract in June, citing personal reasons.

== International career ==
Pusey's first taste of international football for Gibraltar came in 2015 at the 2015 Island Games. He was first called up to the Gibraltar national football team in 2016, but didn't make his debut until 25 March 2017 against Bosnia. He would go on to play 4 more games in Gibraltar's maiden World Cup qualification campaign.

== Personal life ==
In July 2024, Pusey was sentenced to 11 years and three months in prison after being convicted of supplying cocaine and cannabis to gangs in South London.

== Honours ==
Lincoln Red Imps

- Pepe Reyes Cup: 2017
