= Mahmoud Ghandi =

Iranian politician

Mahmoud Ghandi (Persian: محمود قندی, August 25, 1945 in Tehran – June 28, 1981) was an Iranian politician, who served as the Minister of Information and Communications Technology from 1979 to 1981. Ghandi was assassinated along with more than 70 members of the Islamic Republic Party in the Haft-e Tir bombing in Tehran on 28 June 1981.

== See also ==
- Hafte Tir bombing
