= MPC (mobile phone company) =

MPC was a company that provided encrypted phones to criminals.

== Background ==
James and Barry Gillespie were brothers involved in crime in Glasgow. They moved to Portugal to avoid being killed in a gang war while running their business. Scottish police have named their gang the Escalade Group.

== Encrypted phones ==
Initially the brothers used phones from Ennetcom. They then hired developers to develop an operating system for their own phones and distributed them to their own gang and others they worked for. They began selling the phones to other gangs.

They sponsored blogger Martin Kok and ran advertisements.

They also used intimidation tactics against mobile phone resellers.

The phones they adapted were Nexus 5 or Nexus 5X models.

=== Murder of Martin Kok ===
On 8 December 2016 Martin Kok was shot dead outside a sex club in Laren, Netherlands. Christopher Hughes faced charges of concealing money and supplying encrypted devices to others (including Kok), a second charge relating to the supply of cocaine and a final charge in relation to the murder of Kok. In April 2022 Hughes was convicted at the High Court in Stirling, Scotland and jailed for at least 25 years.

Ridouan Taghi is also linked to the murder.

The motive for the murder was blog posts that annoyed Moroccan crime figures with links to the Gillespie brothers. The brothers lulled Kok into a false sense of security by sponsoring him and running adverts on his site. They then arranged for him to be murdered by their associates.

== Status ==
As of October 2019 the company is closed.
