= Paul Massey (gangster) =

British mobster and businessman

- Born: 7 January 1960; Ordsall, Salford, United Kingdom
- Died: 26 July 2015 (aged 55); Manchester Road, Clifton, Greater Manchester, United Kingdom
- Cause of death: Gunshot wound
- Children: 5
- Status: Deceased
- Penalty: 14 years 9 months (served 8 years)

Details
- Imprisoned at: HM Prison Frankland

Paul Massey (7 January 1960 – 26 July 2015) was a British organised crime figure and Salford-based businessman. He was shot dead outside his home by Mark Fellows on 26 July 2015.

== Early life ==
Massey was born on 7 January 1960 in Ordsall, Salford, England. He was one of six children of Rose Massey and John Massey. When Massey was 12, he was arrested for criminal damage and sent to approved school.

== Criminal career ==
In the 1990s, Massey established several security companies. Through these businesses, Damian Noonan, he and his gang were able to control the doors of several Manchester-area nightclubs.

In 1999, Massey was sentenced to 14 years in prison for stabbing a man in the groin.

Several media outlets reported that Massey served as an important mediator between rival organised crime firms in Greater Manchester.

At the time of his death, the regional organised crime squad was investigating Massey over allegations of money-laundering.

== Mayoral campaign ==
In 2012, following his 2007 release from Frankland Prison, Massey announced he was running for mayor of Salford. He finished seventh out of ten candidates.

== Death ==
On 26 July 2015, Massey was shot dead outside his home on Manchester Road, Clifton, by a lone gunman. Mark Fellows, the killer, was reported to have been wearing military-style fatigues and carried a weapon "similar to a sub machine gun". Greater Manchester Police offered a £50,000 reward for information pertaining to the killing.

=== Aftermath ===
Authorities in the Manchester area feared an escalation in gang violence related to Massey's death. Manchester police believe that the shooting of a 29-year-old woman and her seven-year-old son was linked to retribution for the Massey killing. From January–December 2015, there were 19 shootings in Salford.

=== Arrest and conviction ===
On 1 June 2018, Fellows was charged with Massey's murder and also that of Massey's close friend, Liverpool gangster John Kinsella. Fellows was subsequently convicted and sentenced to a whole life order. Conspirators used PGP-equipped BlackBerry phones to co-ordinate the murder.

== Personal life ==
Massey had five children and eight grandchildren at the time of his death. Massey was given the nickname "Mr Big" by city councillor Joe Burrows during a meeting in 1992 held to address ongoing civil disturbances in Salford.
