= Ortiz (disambiguation) =

Ortiz is a Spanish-language surname.

Ortiz may also refer to:

- Ortiz, Guárico, a town in Guárico State, Venezuela
- Ortiz Municipality, Guárico State, Venezuela
- Ortiz, Colorado, United States, a village
- Ortiz Island, Antarctica
- Ortiz, half of the professional wrestling tag team Santana and Ortiz, Mexican professional wrestler Miguel Molina (born 1971)
