= National Intelligence Coordination Centre =

Branch of the RCMP that specialises in intelligence analysis

The National Intelligence Coordination Centre is a branch of the Royal Canadian Mounted Police that deals with online threats. It was created in 2013 and deals with online crimes at home and abroad. It also monitors terrorist groups or protestors who might sabotage infrastructure.

Information is gathered by RCMP officers, merged with information from other intelligence arms such as Canadian Security Intelligence Service or Financial Transactions and Reports Analysis Centre of Canada. From this the NICC produces reports for the RCMP.

It also produces reports for international partners in the Five Eyes intelligence alliance.

== Origins ==
=== October Crisis ===
Historically intelligence gathering had been done by the RCMP through their branch the RCMP Security Service. The October Crisis led to the RCMP collecting intelligence by stealing documents and planting dynamite on suspected radicals. Government investigations of this led to a new agency - the Canadian Security Intelligence Service being formed in 1984.

=== Maher Arar scandal ===
After the September 11 attacks the RCMP had a renewed interest in intelligence work. The Communications Security Establishment dealt with signals intelligence and the CSIS with Human intelligence. The RCMP had been frozen out of intelligence gathering and skills had atrophied.

Maher Arar was arrested, rendered to Syria and tortured as the result of unfounded conclusions that had been shared with the FBI. A 2006 review found no evidence that he was linked to terrorist organisations and concluded the RCMP "lacked the expertise to conduct national security investigations".

== Director General arrested ==
In September 2019 the RCMP arrested Cameron Ortis, who was director general of the National Intelligence Coordination Centre, who had been running the NICC since 2016. He had joined the RCMP in 2007 from an academic background in technology and crime, after completing a PhD at the University of British Columbia before he joined. He was hired as a strategic analyst - a position described as a "jack of all trades". In November 2023, a jury found Ortis guilty of multiple counts under the Security of Information Act. Ortis was sentenced to 14 years in prison in February 2024.
