= Ennetcom =

Netherlands based communications network and service provider

- Industry: Computer software
- Defunct: 2016
- Area served: Worldwide
- Key people: Danny Manupassa
- Website: ennetcom.com at the Wayback Machine (archived 2016-03-05)

Ennetcom was a Netherlands based communications network and service provider.

== Overview ==
The company was based in the Netherlands as were most of its customers, but most of the company servers were based in Canada. Danny Manupassa, the company owner, was arrested in 2016 amid allegations that the phones were largely used by criminals. The company had about 19,000 users.

The phones sold for €1,500 each and used company servers for traffic. The devices had been altered so they could not make calls or use the Internet normally.

== Seizure ==
Canadian authorities seized the servers and passed messages to Dutch authorities. The latter had managed to decrypt 3.6 million messages by 2017, apparently because the key to the messages had been stored on the same servers the messages were on. These messages have led to arrests, including that of Naoufal Fassih. Fassih has been convicted of one charge of murder and one of attempted murder in relation to the murder of Ali Motamed.

== See also ==
- ANOM
- EncroChat
- Exclu
- Sky Global
