= List of awards and nominations received by Tom Hardy =

Tom Hardy awards and nominations
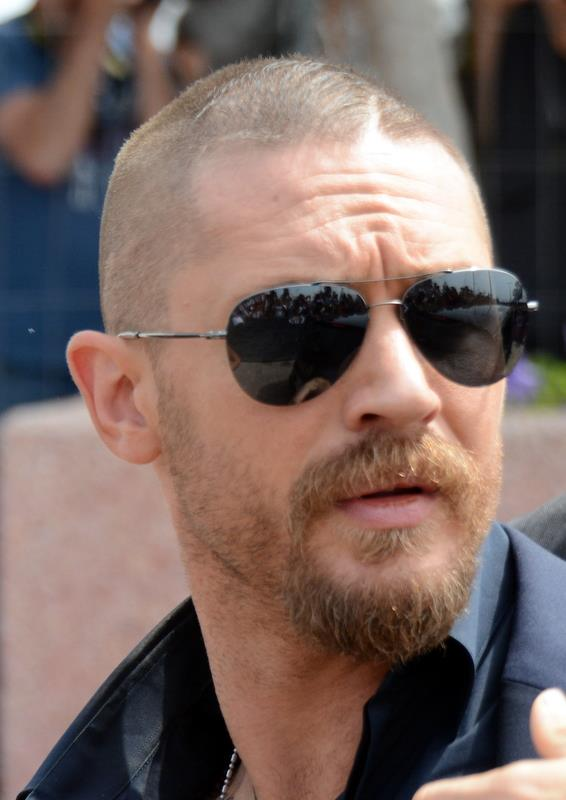
- Hardy at the Cannes Film Festival in 2015
Awards and nominations
| Award | Wins | Nominations |
| Academy Awards | 0 | 1 |
| BAFTA Awards | 1 | 2 |
| Critics' Choice Awards | 1 | 2 |
| European Film Awards | 0 | 1 |
| Laurence Olivier Awards | 0 | 1 |

Totals (Note: Certain award groups do not simply award one winner. They acknowledge several different recipients, have runners-up, and have third place. Since this is a specific recognition and is different from losing an award, runner-up mentions are considered wins in this award tally. For simplification and to avoid errors, each award in this list has been presumed to have had a prior nomination.)
- Wins: 7
- Nominations: 36

The following is a list of awards and nominations received by Tom Hardy.

Tom Hardy is an English actor known for his leading roles on stage and screen. He has received various awards including a BAFTA Award as well as nominations for an Academy Award, a British Academy Television Award, a European Film Award, and a Laurence Olivier Award. He was appointed a Commander of the Order of the British Empire (CBE) in the 2018 Birthday Honours for services to drama.

Hardy was awarded the BAFTA Rising Star Award from the British Academy of Film and Television Arts. He was nominated for the British Academy Television Award for Best Actor for his role in Stuart: A Life Backwards (2008). He was nominated for the Academy Award for Best Supporting Actor for his performance as John S. Fitzgerald in the Alejandro González Iñárritu's epic western action drama film The Revenant (2015). He won the British Independent Film Award for Best Actor twice for Bronson (2009) and Legend (2015). He won the Critics' Choice Movie Award for Best Actor in an Action Movie for his portrayal of Max Rockatansky in George Miller post-apocalyptic action film Mad Max: Fury Road (2015).

On stage, he was nominated for the Laurence Olivier Award for Best Newcomer in a Play for his role in the Stephen Adly Guirgis dramatic play In Arabia We'd All Be Kings (2004).

== Major associations ==
=== Academy Awards ===
| Year | Category | Nominated work | Result | Ref. |
|---|---|---|---|---|
| 2016 | Best Supporting Actor | The Revenant | Nominated | |

=== BAFTA Awards ===
| Year | Category | Nominated work | Result | Ref. |
British Academy Film Awards
| 2011 | Rising Star Award | | Won | |
British Academy Television Awards
| 2008 | Best Actor | Stuart: A Life Backwards | Nominated | |

=== Critics' Choice Awards ===
| Year | Category | Nominated work | Result | Ref. |
Critics' Choice Movie Awards
| 2015 | Best Supporting Actor | The Revenant | Nominated | |
| 2015 | Best Actor in an Action Movie | Mad Max: Fury Road | Won | |

=== European Film Awards ===
| Year | Category | Nominated work | Result | Ref. |
|---|---|---|---|---|
| 2014 | European Actor | Locke | Nominated | |

=== Laurence Olivier Awards ===
| Year | Category | Nominated work | Result | Ref. |
|---|---|---|---|---|
| 2004 | Best Newcomer in a Play | In Arabia We'd All Be Kings | Nominated | |

== Miscellaneous associations ==
| Ceremony | Year | Category | Nominated work | Result | Ref. |
|---|---|---|---|---|---|
| AACTA Awards | 2018 | Best Supporting Actor | Dunkirk | Nominated | |
| Awards Circuit Community Awards | 2015 | Best Supporting Actor | The Revenant | Nominated | |
| British Independent Film Awards | 2009 | Best Actor | Bronson | Won | |
| British Independent Film Awards | 2011 | Best Supporting Actor | Tinker Tailor Soldier Spy | Nominated | |
| British Independent Film Awards | 2013 | Best Actor | Locke | Nominated | |
| British Independent Film Awards | 2015 | Best Actor | Legend | Won | |
| C21's International Drama Awards | 2017 | Best Male Performance in a Drama Series | Taboo | Won | |
| Chlotrudis Awards | 2015 | Best Actor | Locke | Won | |
| Crime Thriller Awards | 2009 | Best Actor | The Take | Nominated | |
| Dorian Awards | 2012 | Rising Star of the Year | | Nominated | |
| Dorian Awards | 2016 | Film Performance of the Year - Actor | Legend | Nominated | |
| Empire Awards | 2016 | Best Actor | Mad Max: Fury Road / Legend | Nominated | |
| Evening Standard British Film Awards | 2010 | Best Actor | Bronson | Nominated | |
| Gold Derby | 2012 | Ensemble Cast | Inception | Nominated | |
| Gold Derby | 2016 | Ensemble Cast | Mad Max: Fury Road | Nominated | |
| Gold Derby | 2016 | The Revenant | Supporting Actor | Nominated | |
| Golden Schmoes Awards | 2010 | Breakthrough Performance of the Year | Inception | Nominated | |
| Golden Schmoes Awards | 2012 | Favorite Celebrity of the Year | | Nominated | |
| Golden Schmoes Awards | 2015 | Best Actor of the Year | Mad Max: Fury Road | Nominated | |
| Golden Schmoes Awards | 2015 | Best Supporting Actor of the Year | The Revenant | Nominated | |
| Hollywood Creative Alliance | 2018 | Best Visual Effects or Animated Performance | Venom | Nominated | |
| IndieWire Critics Poll | 2009 | Best Lead Performance | Bronson | Nominated | |
| IndieWire Critics Poll | 2014 | Best Lead Actor | Locke | Nominated | |
| International Online Cinema Awards | 2014 | Best Actor | Locke | Nominated | |
| International Online Cinema Awards | 2015 | Best Actor | Mad Max: Fury Road | Nominated | |
| Italian Online Movie Awards | 2015 | Best Actor | Locke | Nominated | |
| Jupiter Award | 2016 | Best International Actor | Mad Max: Fury Road | Nominated | |
| MTV Movie & TV Awards | 2011 | Best Line from a Movie | Inception | Nominated | |
| MTV Movie & TV Awards | 2012 | Best Fight | Warrior (shared with Joel Edgerton) | Nominated | |
| MTV Movie & TV Awards | 2013 | Best Fight | The Dark Knight Rises (shared with Christian Bale) | Nominated | |
| MTV Movie & TV Awards | 2013 | Best Villain | The Dark Knight Rises | Nominated | |
| MTV Movie & TV Awards | 2016 | Best Fight | Mad Max: Fury Road (shared with Charlize Theron) | Nominated | |
| MTV Movie & TV Awards | 2016 | Best Villain | The Revenant | Nominated | |
| MTV Movie & TV Awards | 2019 | Best Kiss | Venom (shared with Michelle Williams) | Nominated | |
| People's Choice Awards | 2011 | Favorite On-Screen Team | Inception (shared with cast) | Nominated | |
| Royal Television Society | 2010 | Best Actor (Male) | The Take | Nominated | |
| Russian National Movie Awards | 2013 | Best Foreign Actor of the Year | | Nominated | |
| Russian National Movie Awards | 2014 | Best Foreign Actor of the Decade | | Nominated | |
| Sant Jordi Awards | 2015 | Best Foreign Actor | Locke / The Drop | Won | |
| Satellite Awards | 2012 | Best Actor – Motion Picture | Warrior | Nominated | |
| Satellite Awards | 2016 | Best Actor – Motion Picture | Legend | Nominated | |
| Satellite Awards | 2018 | Best Actor – Television Series Drama | Taboo | Nominated | |
| Saturn Awards | 2003 | Best Supporting Actor | Star Trek: Nemesis | Nominated | |
| Saturn Awards | 2011 | Best Supporting Actor | Inception | Nominated | |
| Scream Awards | 2010 | Inception | Breakout Performance - Male | Won | |
| Teen Choice Awards | 2012 | Choice Movie Actor – Action | Warrior | Nominated | |
| Teen Choice Awards | 2013 | Choice Movie Villain | The Dark Knight Rises | Nominated | |

== Critics associations ==
| Ceremony | Year | Category | Nominated work | Result | Ref. |
|---|---|---|---|---|---|
| Australian Film Critics Association | 2016 | Best Actor | Mad Max: Fury Road | Nominated | |
| Central Ohio Film Critics Association | 2011 | Best Ensemble | Inception | Nominated | |
| Central Ohio Film Critics Association | 2012 | Best Ensemble | Tinker Tailor Soldier Spy | Won | |
| Central Ohio Film Critics Association | 2016 | Actor of the Year | The Revenant | Nominated | |
| Central Ohio Film Critics Association | 2016 | Best Supporting Actor | The Revenant | Nominated | |
| Dallas–Fort Worth Film Critics Association | 2015 | Best Supporting Actor | The Revenant | Nominated | |
| Denver Film Critics Society | 2016 | Best Supporting Actor | The Revenant | Nominated | |
| Detroit Film Critics Society | 2014 | Best Actor | Locke | Nominated | |
| Detroit Film Critics Society | 2015 | Best Actor | Legend | Nominated | |
| Dublin Film Critics' Circle | 2009 | Best Actor | Bronson | Nominated | |
| Dublin Film Critics' Circle | 2014 | Best Actor | Locke | Nominated | |
| Georgia Film Critics Association | 2012 | Best Supporting Actor | Tinker Tailor Soldier Spy | Nominated | |
| Houston Film Critics Society | 2015 | Best Actor | Locke | Nominated | |
| Houston Film Critics Society | 2016 | Best Actor | Legend | Nominated | |
| Houston Film Critics Society | 2016 | Best Supporting Actor | The Revenant | Won | |
| Indiana Film Journalists Association | 2015 | Best Actor | Locke | Nominated | |
| Kansas City Film Critics Circle | 2015 | Best Supporting Actor | The Revenant | Nominated | |
| London Film Critics' Circle | 2010 | British Actor of the Year | Bronson | Nominated | |
| London Film Critics' Circle | 2011 | British Supporting Actor of the Year | Inception | Nominated | |
| London Film Critics' Circle | 2015 | British Actor of the Year | The Locke / The Drop | Nominated | |
| London Film Critics' Circle | 2016 | Best Supporting Actor | The Revenant | Nominated | |
| London Film Critics' Circle | 2016 | Actor of the Year | The Revenant | Nominated | |
| London Film Critics' Circle | 2016 | British/Irish Actor of the Year | Mad Max: Fury Road / Legend; The Revenant / London Road | Won | |
| Los Angeles Film Critics Association | 2014 | Best Actor | Locke | Won | |
| National Society of Film Critics | 2015 | Best Actor | Locke | Nominated | |
| Nevada Film Critics Society | 2012 | Best Actor | Warrior | Won | |
| Nevada Film Critics Society | 2015 | Best Supporting Actor | The Revenant | Won | |
| North Carolina Film Critics Association | 2015 | Best Actor | Locke | Nominated | |
| Online Film & Television Association | 2011 | Best Breakthrough Performance: Male | Inception | Nominated | |
| Online Film & Television Association | 2016 | Best Supporting Actor | The Revenant | Won | |
| Phoenix Critics Circle | 2015 | Best Supporting Actor | The Revenant | Nominated | |
| Phoenix Film Critics Society | 2010 | Best Ensemble Acting | Inception (shared with entire cast) | Nominated | |
| Phoenix Film Critics Society | 2015 | Best Actor in a Supporting Role | The Revenant | Nominated | |
| San Diego Film Critics Society | 2014 | Best Actor | Locke | Nominated | |
| Seattle Film Critics Society | 2015 | Best Actor | Locke | Nominated | |
| Seattle Film Critics Society | 2016 | Best Supporting Actor | The Revenant | Nominated | |
| St. Louis Film Critics Association | 2014 | Best Actor | Locke | Nominated | |
| Toronto Film Critics Association | 2014 | Best Actor | Locke | Won | |
| Toronto Film Critics Association | 2015 | Best Actor | Legend | Won | |
| Village Voice Film Poll | 2009 | Best Actor | Bronson | Nominated | |
| Village Voice Film Poll | 2014 | Best Actor | Locke | Nominated | |
| Washington D.C. Area Film Critics Association | 2010 | Best Ensemble | Inception (shared with entire cast) | Nominated | |
| Washington D.C. Area Film Critics Association | 2015 | Best Supporting Actor | The Revenant | Nominated | |
| Women Film Critics Circle | 2011 | Best Actor | Tinker Tailor Soldier Spy / Warrior | Nominated | |
| Women Film Critics Circle | 2014 | Best Actor | Locke | Nominated | |
