= Steven Knight =

English screenwriter and film director

Steven Knight CBE
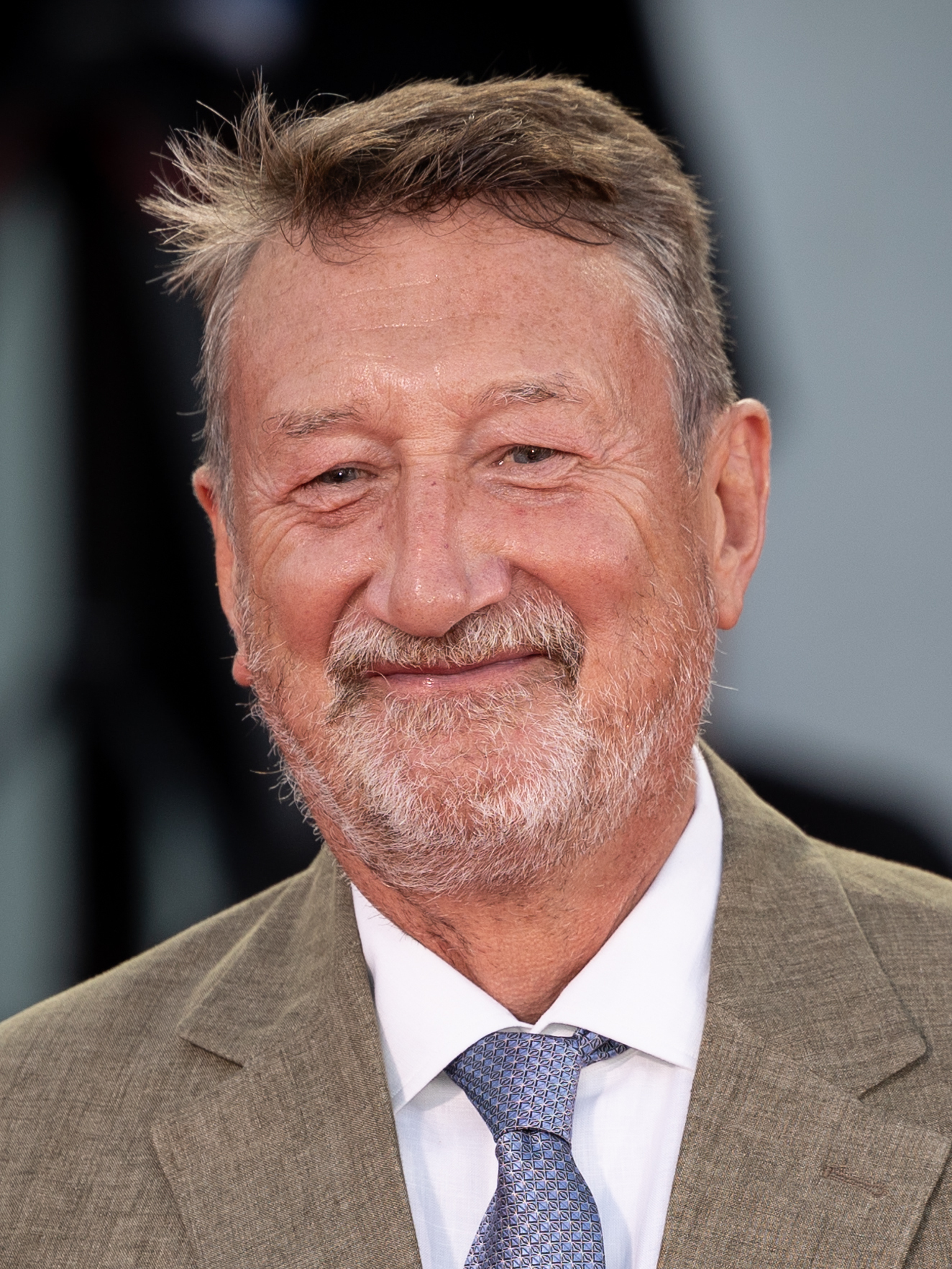
- Knight in 2024
- Born: 5 August 1959 (age 67); Birmingham, England
- Education: University College London
- Occupations: Screenwriter; producer; film director
- Years active: 1989–present
- Spouse: Margot Kenrick
- Children: 7

Steven Knight (born 5 August 1959) is an English film and television show maker. He wrote the screenplays for the films Closed Circuit, Dirty Pretty Things, and Eastern Promises, and also wrote and directed the films Locke, Hummingbird (a.k.a. Redemption) and Serenity. In July 2025, it was announced that he will write the 26th official James Bond film, to be directed by Denis Villeneuve.

Knight is one of three creators of Who Wants to Be a Millionaire?, a game show that has been remade and aired in around 160 countries worldwide. He is also the creator of the BBC's Peaky Blinders, The Detectives, SAS: Rogue Heroes, A Thousand Blows, and House of Guinness. He has also written for Commercial Breakdown, See, and Taboo.

He has built a large film and television studio complex in inner-city Birmingham called Digbeth Loc., opening in 2024.

== Early life and education ==
Steven Knight was born in 1959 to George and Ida Knight in Birmingham, where he grew up in the West Midlands region of England. He was the youngest of seven children, five of them boys. His father was a blacksmith.

He attended The Streetly School as a teenager, in Streetly, Sutton Coldfield, in the West Midlands. He then went on to study English at University College London.

== Career ==
After completing university, Knight returned to Birmingham and began writing radio commercials, before moving back to London, where he worked for Capital Radio. He first wrote television comedy, then novels, and then moved on to screenplays.

=== Screenplays ===
Before he created TV's Peaky Blinders, Knight was best known for screenplays he wrote for the films Dirty Pretty Things and Eastern Promises. His work on the screenplay for Dirty Pretty Things earned him the Edgar Award for Best Motion Picture Screenplay and London Film Critics Circle award for British Screenwriter of the Year. The screenplay was also nominated for several other awards including the Academy Award for Writing Original Screenplay and the BAFTA Award for Best Original Screenplay.

Knight wrote the screenplay for the 2013 film Closed Circuit, which was directed by John Crowley and which starred Eric Bana and Rebecca Hall.

Knight wrote a draft of a screenplay based on the book Shutter Island written by Dennis Lehane, but the draft that was used for the movie of the same name was written by Laeta Kalogridis.

Recent films based on screenplays that Knight has written include The Hundred-Foot Journey directed by Lasse Hallström, based on the book of the same name by Richard C. Morais and starring Helen Mirren; Seventh Son, an adventure story starring Jeff Bridges, Julianne Moore, Djimon Hounsou, Kit Harington and Jason Scott Lee, as well as the film Pawn Sacrifice, based on U.S. chess champion Bobby Fischer, with Tobey Maguire playing Fischer in the film. He also wrote the screenplay of World War Z II.

Knight wrote the script for the 2021 dramedy Locked Down, about a couple (Anne Hathaway and Chiwetel Ejiofor) attempting a high-stakes jewellery heist during the COVID-19 pandemic. Knight later wrote the script for the film Spencer, starring Kristen Stewart as Diana, Princess of Wales. Knight would subsequently reunite with Spencer director Pablo Larraín on the film Maria, starring Angelina Jolie as Maria Callas.

In March 2023, it was reported that Knight would write the screenplay for an upcoming Star Wars film directed by Sharmeen Obaid-Chinoy, replacing Damon Lindelof and Justin Britt-Gibson. The film is set to be a continuation to the Star Wars sequel trilogy, focusing on Rey Skywalker's attempts to bring back the Jedi Order. However, by October 2024, Knight departed from the film.

It was also announced in March 2023 that Knight would be writing the screenplay for a remake of the Alfred Hitchcock film Vertigo for Paramount Pictures, with Robert Downey Jr. eyed for the lead role.

In July 2025, it was announced that he will write the screenplay of the next James Bond film, to be directed by Denis Villeneuve. Deadline reported that Knight landed the job after he met with Villeneuve, with various other writers in the running. He said, "It has always been on my bucket list and it's fantastic to be invited to do it, I can't wait to get started. I'm hoping that, being a Bond fan for so many years, it will be imbued into me and I will be able to produce something that's the same but different, and better, stronger and bolder."

Knight's writing sometimes involves "groups of men who are probably not the easiest people to fit into conventional society."

=== Directing ===
In addition to his writing, Knight has directed three films: Hummingbird (2013), starring Jason Statham, Locke (2013), starring Tom Hardy, and Serenity (2019) starring Matthew McConaughey, Diane Lane, and Anne Hathaway. Locke won a British Independent Film Award in 2013 for Best Screenplay. Knight has directed several episodes of the TV series for which he also frequently wrote, The Detectives.

In 2022, Knight was the co-director of the Opening Ceremony for the Birmingham 2022 Commonwealth Games, which took place on 28 July 2022.

=== TV series ===
Knight also co-created the TV series game show Who Wants to Be a Millionaire? (along with Mike Whitehill and David Briggs) and also is the creator of the TV series Show do Milhão and All About Me.

Knight created the television series Peaky Blinders and has written for TV series including BBC's Commercial Breakdown (with comedian Jasper Carrott), Comedy Playhouse (the episode "Wild Oats" in 1993), Frankie's On..., Auntie's Big Bloomers, Taboo, and Canned Carrott.

He created and wrote A Christmas Carol, a dark adaptation of the Dickens story for BBC One in the UK and FX in the US, starring Guy Pearce as Scrooge and Andy Serkis as the Ghost of Christmas Past, as well as an adaptation of Dickens' Great Expectations starring Olivia Colman as Miss Havisham. It was notable for its ending, which steered markedly from that of Dickens's original.

== Studios ==
As of 2024, Knight has been involved in establishing a new television and film studio complex, called Digbeth Loc., in Digbeth, central Birmingham, opening in 2025. The complex would be a home for the band UB40, as well as providing filming facilities for a new Peaky Blinders film, and the BBC drama series This Town.

== Awards and honours ==
Knight was appointed Commander of the Order of the British Empire (CBE) in the 2020 New Year Honours for services to drama, entertainment and the community in Birmingham.

== Personal life and media appearances ==
As of August 2024, Knight lives in Gloucestershire and is married with seven children.

Knight is a lifelong supporter of Birmingham City FC, and in 2025 was the executive producer on the documentary Built in Birmingham: Brady & the Blues following Tom Brady and Tom Wagner's takeover of the club and it’s transformation.

Knight was a guest on Desert Island Discs on BBC Radio 4 on 11 August 2024, selecting George Michael, Bulgarian folk music, and Harry Lauder (the latter a reference to his support of Birmingham City F.C.), among others. He spoke about a variety of topics, including chess, Charles Dickens, Diana, Princess of Wales, and the origins of the SAS.

== Filmography ==
=== Film ===
Year	Title	Director	Writer	Producer
2001	Gypsy Woman	No	Yes	No
2002	Dirty Pretty Things	No	Yes	No
2006	Amazing Grace	No	Yes	No
2007	Eastern Promises	No	Yes	No
2013	Closed Circuit	No	Yes	No
2013	Hummingbird	Yes	Yes	No
2013	Locke	Yes	Yes	No
2014	The Hundred-Foot Journey	No	Yes	No
2014	Seventh Son	No	Yes	No
2014	Pawn Sacrifice	No	Yes	No
2015	Burnt	No	Yes	No
2016	Allied	No	Yes	Executive
2017	Woman Walks Ahead	No	Yes	No
2017	November Criminals	No	Yes	Executive
2018	The Girl in the Spider's Web	No	Yes	No
2019	Serenity	Yes	Yes	Yes
2021	Locked Down	No	Yes	No
2021	Spencer	No	Yes	Executive
2024	Maria	No	Yes	Executive
2026	Peaky Blinders: The Immortal Man	No	Yes	Yes
2026	Oasis: Don't Look Back in Anger	No	Yes	No

=== Television ===
Year	Title	Writer	Executive producer	Creator	Director	Notes
1989	Commercial Breakdown	Yes	No	No	No	
1990–1992	Canned Carrott	Yes	No	No	No	
1993–1997	The Detectives	Yes	No	No	Yes	
1998–present	Who Wants to Be a Millionaire?	Yes	No	Yes	No	Co-created with David Briggs and Mike Whitehill
2002–2004	All About Me	Yes	No	Yes	No	
2013–2022	Peaky Blinders	Yes	Yes	Yes	No	
2017	Taboo	Yes	Yes	Yes	No	Co-created with Tom Hardy and Chips Hardy
2019–2022	See	Yes	Yes	Yes	No	
2019	A Christmas Carol	Yes	Yes	Yes	No	
2022–present	SAS: Rogue Heroes	Yes	Yes	Yes	No	
2023	Great Expectations	Yes	Yes	No	No	
2023	All the Light We Cannot See	Yes	No	Yes	No	Co-developed with Shawn Levy
2024	This Town	Yes	Yes	Yes	No	
2024	The Veil	Yes	Yes	Yes	No	
2025–present	A Thousand Blows	Yes	Yes	Yes	No	
2025–present	House of Guinness	Yes	Yes	Yes	No	
