= Helping Henry =

British children's television programme

Helping Henry is a British children's television programme, which ran for one series of thirteen 15-minute episodes on Channel 4 in 1988. Designed as an educational show, it featured a young boy named Stephen explaining how things worked to an alien named N-3 (or "Henry"), who was disguised as a dining-room chair because his superiors believed that static four legged things were clearly a superior species to the 'two legs' who bustled about them. "Henry" was designed and built by Fluck and Law, creators of the puppets for Spitting Image, and voiced by Jeremy Hardy.

The series was created and written by Edward "Chips" Hardy (the father of actor Tom Hardy) and John Henderson. One of the additional writers was Peter Algate.
