= James Delaney (Taboo) =

Fictional character

- Taboo character
- Created by: Steven Knight
- Portrayed by: Tom Hardy

In-universe information
- Full name: James Keziah Delaney
- Alias: Devil Delaney
- Occupation: Businessman; Adventurer
- Family: Horace Delaney (father; deceased); Lorna Delaney (stepmother); Zilpha Geary (half-sister; deceased)
- Relatives: Thorne Geary (brother-in-law; deceased)
- Nationality: British

James Keziah Delaney is a fictional character and the dark amoral protagonist in the 2017 FX/BBC One television series Taboo, in which he is portrayed by Tom Hardy. Delaney is portrayed in London in 1814, he has a vendetta against the East India Company and is caught in vicious feud between the British Crown, the United States government and the East India Company regarding ownership of the North American trading post known as Nootka sound, which Delaney has inherited from his father. The land is about to become a very valuable piece of property due to the establishment of border between the United States and Canada.

== Background ==
Delaney is an adventurer and a businessman, who returns to London in 1814, after 12 years in Africa, to attend the funeral of his father Horace Delaney. Horace Delaney was a shipping merchant, but was likely insane towards the end of his life. James discovers he was poisoned by the family man servant, who saw it as a 'mercy' killing due to the insanity and distress the father was in.

James is shrouded in mystery and preceded by wild rumours. He is known as 'Devil Delaney' many people fear him though he is not an outcast from society as it seems he attracts a great deal of curious respect for his drive and ruthless ambition to achieve his goals.

Delaney is viewed by London society with great suspicion and dark rumors about the man are rampant. He is known as a very dangerous individual, with many hints that he practices dark arts that he learned in Africa. Delaney is a dangerous blend of numerous literary characters such as Marlow from Joseph Conrad's Heart of Darkness, Hannibal Lecter, with a dash of werewolf for good measure.

James is an affluent man due to diamonds he brought back from Africa. He uses his financial means to support his long term goals related to the Nootka sound trading post he has inherited from his father. The issue of Nootka sound is at the heart of Delaney's various activities, his hatred of the East India Company also drives a lot of his sinister plans.

== Appearance and personality ==
Delaney is an amoral adventurer, enigmatic and mysterious, with a dark and violent nature. His character is cold, direct and inexorable. James follows his plans and ideas in a ruthless manner, never doubting them. He performs special rituals, he believes and just might be able to talk to the dead. He can communicate and interact through 'black magic' with his half-sister Zilpha.

James is totally amoral and has been having a sexual relationship with his half sister Zilpha (they share the same father) the relationship predates his 1814 return from Africa. He has a mystic connection with his long dead mother who was acquired by his father from a tribe around Nootka sound located in modern day Vancouver, Canada. During his training at the East India Company, James proved to be an outstanding cadet, an expert in all manner of weapons, fighting, and survival.

Delaney may have psychopathic tendencies and has no reservations in killing his opponents when it is needed, but he appears to possess his own code of dark morality that seems to garner respect from his both his friends and enemies. Delaney seems to have little fear of death, there are many who think he was a Shaman in Africa and he has intense mystic visions and sees the dead, but is not afraid of the ghosts and demons he sees. He may have committed many atrocities such as drowning 200 slaves on a slaving ship by nailing them in the hold as the ship sinks. He has no remorse for these actions.

Delaney is manipulative and his interpersonal relationships are transactional, he often uses the sinister phrase "I have a use for you" - which emphasizes his view of relationships with others.

James is a man in his early thirties with a compact and muscular frame, he is very capable with his fists and many weapons. He is an expert with a knife and is known to disembowel his opponents. Delaney has a high pain threshold and is able to resist extreme torture and abuse. He has a scarred face, and blue eyes. James has numerous tribal tattoos all over his body, made during his stay in Africa.

Delaney has a notable tattoo of the sankofa bird a mystical symbol, it also appears as a repeated carving in his time in London. The image is of a bird with its head turned backwards taking an egg off its back. It is a potent Asante mystic symbol invoking the recurring theme of taboos in his life, incest, mass murder, and his many taboo amoral acts, and essentially meaning “it is not taboo to fetch what is at risk of being left behind".
