= Golden Balls =

British television game show (2007–2009)

- Genre: Game show
- Directed by: Julian Smith; Kate Douglas-Walker
- Presented by: Jasper Carrott
- Starring: Amanda Grant
- Theme music composer: Marc Sylvan
- Country of origin: United Kingdom
- Original language: English
- No. of series: 6
- No. of episodes: 289

Production
- Running time: 60 minutes (inc. adverts)
- Production company: Initial

Original release
- Network: ITV1
- Release: 18 June 2007 – 18 December 2009

Golden Balls is a British daytime game show that was presented by Jasper Carrott. It was broadcast on ITV1 for 2 and a half years from 18 June 2007 to 18 December 2009 (The Week before Christmas Day).

== Gameplay ==
=== Round 1 ===
At the back of the studio is the "Golden Bank", a giant contraption like a lottery machine. Inside are 100 golden balls, containing cash values that range from £10 to £75,000. Twelve of these balls are randomly drawn from the Golden Bank and put into a mixer, and four "Killer" balls are added by Amanda Grant, referred to by Carrott as the "Balls' Assistant" or "Killer Queen". These 16 balls are split equally and randomly among four contestants, each of whom places two balls on their own front and back row holders without looking inside. As Carrott introduces the contestants, they open their front-row balls for all to see.

Following the introductions, the contestants each secretly look at their own back-row balls and announce the contents; they may either tell the truth or lie as they see fit. They then discuss who they think is lying and try to establish who has the worst set of balls, in terms of the lowest total value and/or the most Killer balls. Each contestant secretly casts one vote as to whom they want to remove from the game. The contestant who receives the most votes is eliminated with no winnings. In the event of a two-way tie, the contestants not involved in it must discuss further and try to reach a consensus. If they do, the chosen contestant is eliminated; if not, each tied contestant is given one more ball at random, dispensed from the mixer. One is a Killer, the other is empty, and the person who receives the Killer is out of the game. If every contestant receives one vote, all four continue their discussion; the first three to reach an agreement on who should be eliminated advance to the next round.

All four contestants reveal their back-row balls, and the eliminated contestant must then "bin" their balls, dropping them down a chute and removing them permanently from play. Any extra balls used for a tiebreaker are also discarded.

=== Round 2 ===
The remaining balls from the three surviving contestants are closed and put into the mixer. Two more cash balls are drawn from the Golden Bank, and one more Killer is added to give a total of 15 balls in play. Each contestant receives five balls, placing two on their front row and three on their back, and play proceeds as in Round 1.

=== Bin or Win? ===
The two remaining contestants' balls are again closed and put back into the mixer, and one more Killer ball is added to give a total of 11 balls in play. The balls are mixed and placed on a table, with the contestants seated at opposite ends. Starting with the contestant who brought more money into this round, each first chooses one ball to "bin" (eliminate) and then one to "win" (place in the jackpot). Each ball is opened as it is chosen. If a cash ball is chosen to win, its value is added to the potential jackpot; if a Killer is chosen, the jackpot is immediately divided by 10. Any "win" Killers that are found before the first "win" cash ball do not affect the jackpot. The contestants take turns choosing until they have five "win" balls, after which the one remaining ball is opened and binned.

Depending on the distribution of the balls in the first two rounds, the number of Killers in play at the start of this round can range from one to six.

=== Split or Steal? ===
Each contestant is given a set of two balls, one each marked "Split" and "Steal", and must secretly choose one to indicate their intentions after looking inside to confirm which is which. The contestants may speak to each other and ask Carrott for advice before making their decision.

- If both choose Split, they each receive half the jackpot.
- If one chooses Steal and the other chooses Split, the Steal contestant wins the entire jackpot and the Split contestant leaves with nothing.
- If both choose Steal, neither contestant wins any money.

== Transmissions ==
Series	Start date	End date	Episodes
1	18 June 2007	10 August 2007	40
2	2 January 2008	21 March 2008	60
3	21 April 2008	4 July 2008	50
4	27 October 2008	12 December 2008	35
5	5 January 2009	13 February 2009	30
6	27 April 2009	18 December 2009	74

== Scientific research ==
Golden Balls has attracted attention from social scientists as a natural experiment on cooperation. A team of economists, including Richard Thaler, has analysed the decisions of the final contestants and found, among other things, the following:

- Individual players on average choose split (to cooperate) 53 percent of the time.
- Contestants' propensity to cooperate is surprisingly high for amounts that would normally be considered consequential but look tiny in their current context, what the authors label a "big peanuts" phenomenon.
- Contestants are less likely to cooperate if their opponent has tried to vote them off the show in the first two rounds of the game, which is in line with the notion that people have an intrinsic preference for reciprocity.
- There is little evidence that contestants' propensity to cooperate depends positively on the likelihood that their opponent will cooperate (i.e., they find little evidence for conditional cooperation).
- Young males are less cooperative than young females, but this gender effect reverses for males 40 years old and above, since men become increasingly more cooperative as their age increases. For males the cooperation is above 30% for age below 30, 50% for 30–40 years old, above 60% for 40–50 and below 80% for age 50 years and above. For females the cooperation rate is below 50% for age below 30, the highest, above 60%, for 30–40 years old, 50% for 40–50 and above 50% for 50 years and above.
- Contestants that promised to split were more likely to split.

Two evolutionary biologists, including Stuart West, have also analysed the correlates of decisions of the final contestants and found similar results. In addition, they also found the following:

- Contestants were less likely to split when their partner had previously lied about the value of their cash balls, but not to hide their killer balls.
- Contestants that initiated laughter were more likely to split.
- In contrast, contestants that initiated physical contact were less likely to split, and being touched was also correlated with being less likely to split.

Another study focuses on whether it is possible to predict the behaviour of contestants by carefully analyzing what they say. They find that contestants who make statements that carry an element of conditionality ("I will split if you split") or implicitness ("I want to split", "I came here to split") are less likely to cooperate than contestants who make more explicit promises ("I will split").

== Reception ==
The first show opened with 1.6 million viewers. Viewership climbed to a steady 2 million viewers. In the same 17:00 timeslot, eight of the first eleven episodes beat Channel 4's Richard & Judy, and The Weakest Link on BBC Two also took a dent from the show's success. Series 2 went on to average 2.1 million viewers in early 2008. As of summer 2009, the show's popularity fell; it attracted only around 1.2 million viewers, which led to the show's termination on 18 December 2009. It was originally repeated throughout the week on Challenge in the UK and Republic of Ireland until 2020, although usually during off-peak times. It has also been repeated on ITV but usually after midnight.

British psychologist Adrian Raine criticised the show, arguing that it "encourages deceitfulness", and that many of its contestants are celebrated for displaying "characteristics of psychopathy". In a review of another ITV quiz show—The Colour of Money—Charlie Brooker criticised Golden Balls' rules, saying that "[Golden Balls] has more rules and clauses than the European Convention on Human Rights".

== Home versions ==
A video game was released on the Nintendo DS and Wii platforms, and another version for mobile devices was released in November 2008 by Mindscape. In 2008, an interactive DVD game was released by Channel 4. Other versions include an electronic board game in 2007 and a card game in 2008.

== International versions ==
An Argentine version aired on América Televisión in 2008, hosted by Horacio Cabak.

Country	Local name	Host(s)	Network	Year aired
Argentina	Golden Balls	Horacio Cabak	América Televisión	2008

== See also ==
The "Split or Steal?" game element, essentially a variant of the prisoner's dilemma, has been used in other game shows, including:

- Shafted, a previous Endemol production.
- Friend or Foe? an American game show.
- De Verraders, a Dutch game show. During the series finale, if both remaining players chose to steal, the last player eliminated before them won the entire jackpot.
- The Bank Job, a British game show distributed by Endemol Shine Group. In the final episode of each series, if the last two remaining players chose "Trash" (the show's equivalent of Steal), the jackpot was divided among the three players who had been eliminated during that episode.
