= Hardy Son & Baker =

British production company

- Industry: Film and television
- Founded: 2012; 14 years ago
- Founders: Tom Hardy; Dean Baker
- Headquarters: London, United Kingdom

Hardy Son & Baker is a production company formed by Tom Hardy and Dean Baker in 2012. The production company signed a two-year first-look deal with NBCUniversal International Television Production in 2014.

== Productions ==
- Poaching Wars (2013)
- Taboo (2017)
- A Christmas Carol (2019)
- Great Expectations (2023)
- Venom: The Last Dance (2024)
- MobLand (2025)

=== In production ===
- Lazarus
- Otherwise Illegal Activity
- Pendulum, a book by Adam Hamdy
- Shackleton
- Trees, a comic adaptation
- Unreasonable Behaviour
