= 2014 Los Angeles Film Critics Association Awards =

Annual US film awards ceremony

40th LAFCA Awards
- Date: December 7, 2014

Highlights
- Best Picture: Boyhood

The 40th Los Angeles Film Critics Association Awards, given by the Los Angeles Film Critics Association (LAFCA), honored the best in film for 2014.

== Winners ==
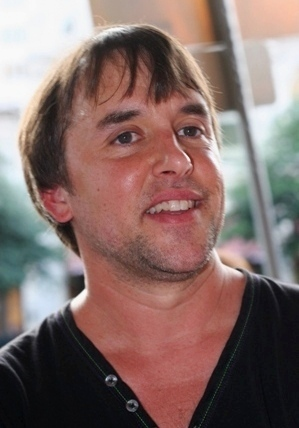
Richard Linklater, Best Director winner

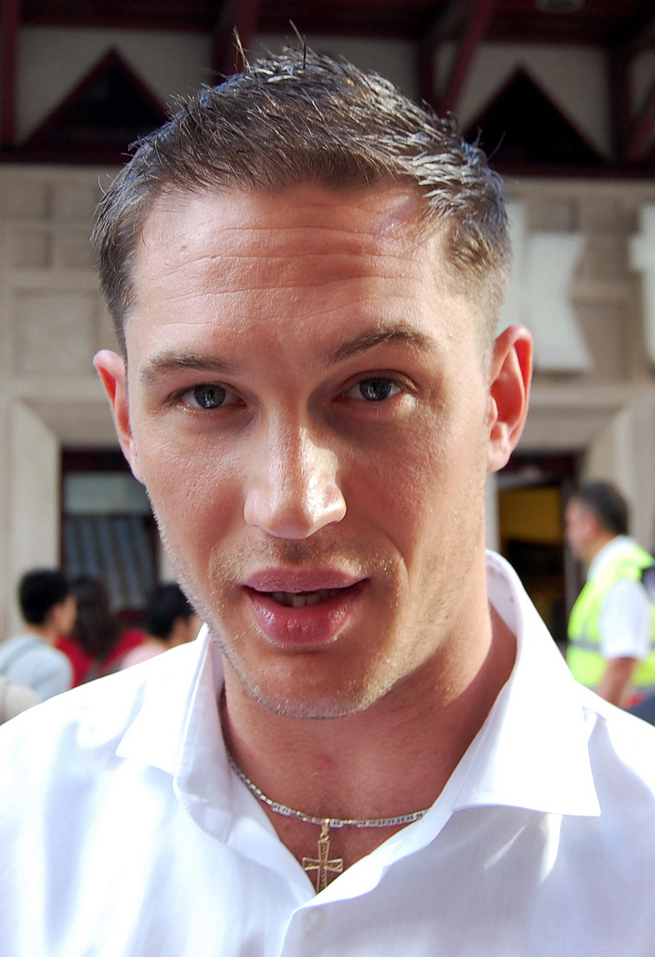
Tom Hardy, Best Actor winner

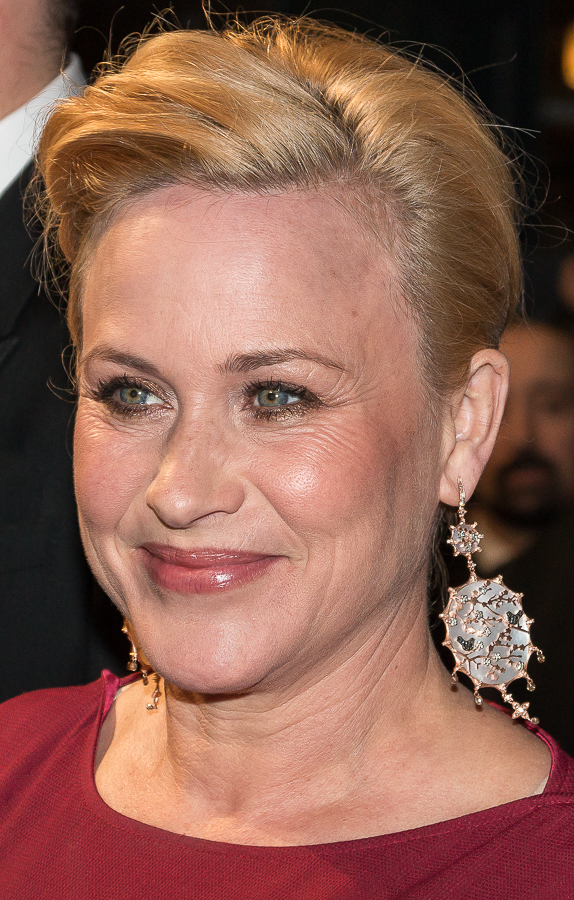
Patricia Arquette, Best Actress winner

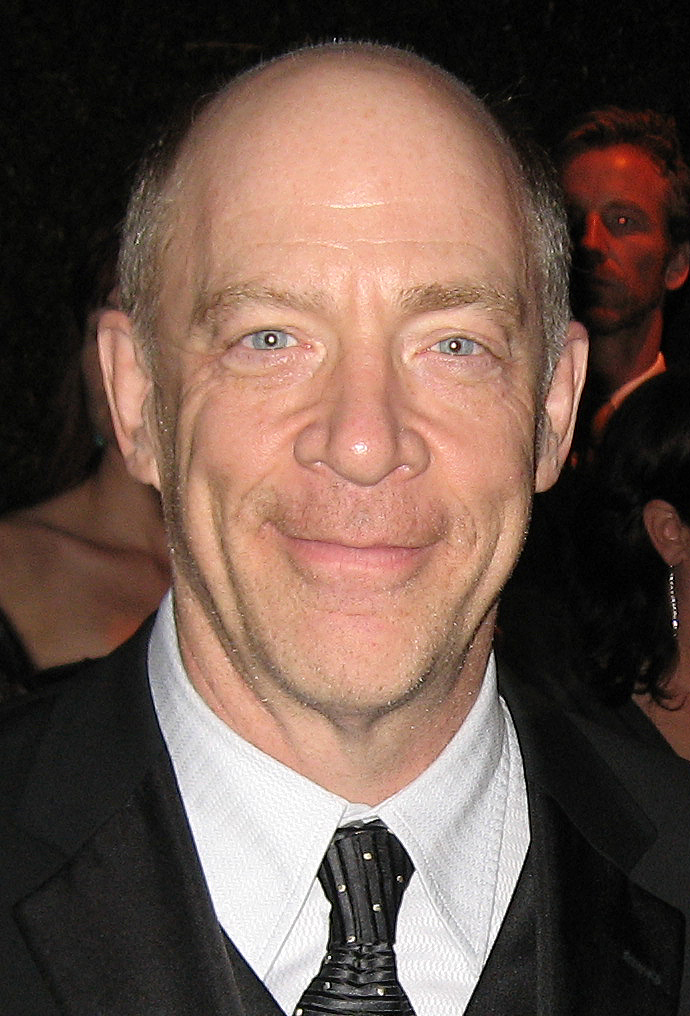
J. K. Simmons, Best Supporting Actor winner

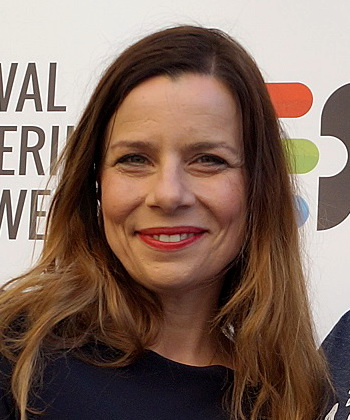
Agata Kulesza, Best Supporting Actress winner

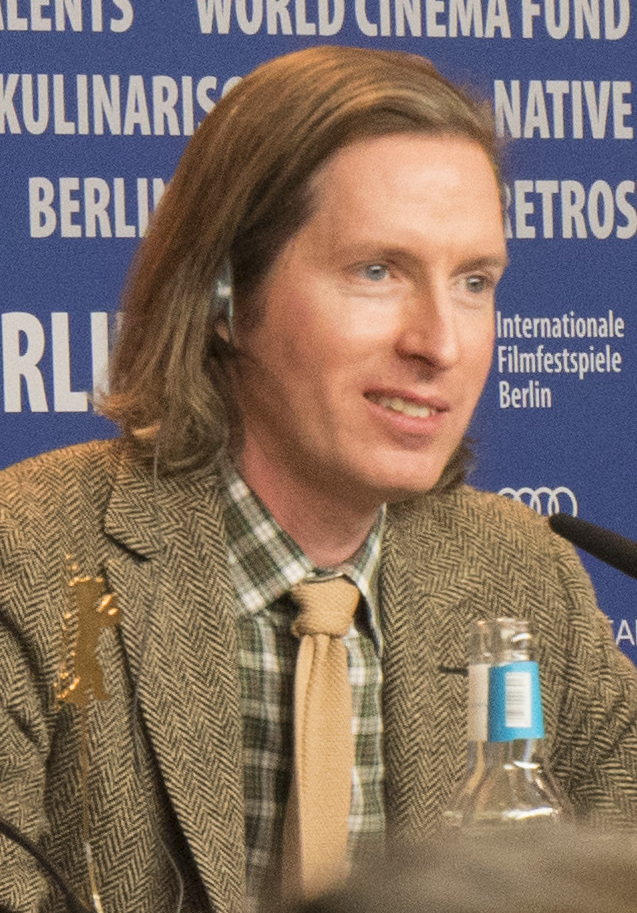
Wes Anderson, Best Screenplay winner

- Best Picture:
  - Boyhood
    - Runner-up: The Grand Budapest Hotel
- Best Director:
  - Richard Linklater – Boyhood
    - Runner-up: Wes Anderson – The Grand Budapest Hotel
- Best Actor:
  - Tom Hardy – Locke
    - Runner-up: Michael Keaton – Birdman
- Best Actress:
  - Patricia Arquette – Boyhood
    - Runner-up: Julianne Moore – Still Alice
- Best Supporting Actor:
  - J. K. Simmons – Whiplash
    - Runner-up: Edward Norton – Birdman
- Best Supporting Actress:
  - Agata Kulesza – Ida
    - Runner-up: Rene Russo – Nightcrawler
- Best Screenplay:
  - Wes Anderson – The Grand Budapest Hotel
    - Runner-up: Alejandro G. Iñárritu, Nicolás Giacobone, Alexander Dinelaris Jr., and Armando Bó – Birdman
- Best Cinematography:
  - Emmanuel Lubezki – Birdman
    - Runner-up: Dick Pope – Mr. Turner
- Best Editing:
  - Sandra Adair – Boyhood
    - Runner-up: Barney Pilling – The Grand Budapest Hotel
- Best Production Design:
  - Adam Stockhausen – The Grand Budapest Hotel
    - Runner-up: Ondřej Nekvasil – Snowpiercer
- Best Music Score (TIE):
  - Jonny Greenwood – Inherent Vice
  - Mica Levi – Under the Skin
- Best Foreign Language Film:
  - Ida • Poland
    - Runner-up: Winter Sleep • Turkey
- Best Documentary/Non-Fiction Film:
  - Citizenfour
    - Runner-up: Life Itself
- Best Animation:
  - The Tale of the Princess Kaguya
    - Runner-up: The Lego Movie
- New Generation Award:
  - Ava DuVernay
- Career Achievement Award:
  - Gena Rowlands
- The Douglas Edwards Experimental/Independent Film/Video Award:
  - Walter Reuben – The David Whiting Story
