= The Detectives (1993 TV series) =

British television comedy series (1993–1997)

- Genre: Police comedy
- Created by: Jasper Carrott
- Starring: Jasper Carrott; Robert Powell; George Sewell
- Composers: Keith Strachan; Matthew Strachan
- Country of origin: United Kingdom
- Original language: English
- No. of series: 5
- No. of episodes: 31

Production
- Running time: 31 mins
- Production company: Celador Productions

Original release
- Network: BBC1
- Release: 27 January 1993 – 28 December 1997

The Detectives is a British comedy television series, starring Jasper Carrott, Robert Powell, and George Sewell. It aired on BBC One from 27 January 1993 to 28 December 1997, and was a spoof of police dramas. It was written by Mike Whitehill and Steve Knight.

== Concept ==
The Detectives originated from a recurring sketch that first appeared on Jasper Carrott's comedy show Canned Carrott. Because of its success, it was turned into a television series. There were a few differences from the sketch to the TV series, such as Dave Briggs being married in the sketch (to Brenda), while in the series, both he and Louis are single and hopeless at romance.

Jasper Carrott and Robert Powell play the bumbling detective constables Bob Louis and David Briggs. They were bad at their job, to the despair of their boss, Superintendent Frank Cottam (played by Sewell). However, they usually ended up solving their cases.

The BBC compared it to the series Special Branch (1969–74), in which Sewell had also appeared. Mark Lewisohn compared it to The Sweeney (1975–78), describing Sewell's role as "a deadpan spin on that series' Chief Inspector Haskins". Moreover, the original sketches were introduced by a blue-tinted sequence and musical score that parodied The Sweeney's opening titles.

Each episode showcased different guest stars, and some of them played the same characters they had played in other television series: Leslie Grantham appeared as Danny Kane from The Paradise Club, while John Nettles and Terence Alexander reprised their roles from Bergerac.

In 2012, BBC1 broadcast a one-off sketch show The One Jasper Carrott (part of a series showcasing various comedians) which included an extended sketch about Briggs and Louis having formed an incompetent private detective agency, Sherlock and Holmes (the role of Superintendent was now played by Michael Melia, who had played the character Brian in the second episode of series 1, as George Sewell had died in 2007).

== Characters ==
=== DC David Briggs ===
Briggs (Robert Powell) usually spoofs the leader of a crime-fighting duo that takes all the risks, leads the cases and comes up with the ideas, but is always unluckier with women.

=== DC Bob Louis ===
Though being the cynic and the voice of reason, Bob Louis (Jasper Carrott) is as hopeless as Briggs at flirting with women.

=== Supt Frank Cottam ===
Frank Cottam (George Sewell) is a parody of Sewell's earlier character in Euston Films drama Special Branch. Cottam usually gives Briggs and Louis dangerous assignments to get rid of them.

=== Sgt ‘Nozzer’ Richardson ===
Nozzer (Tony Selby) is a desk sergeant at West End Central police station. His first appearance was in "Rear Window", although in this episode, the character was a dog handler rather than a desk sergeant. He also appeared in "DC of Love", "The Curse of the Comanches", "Sacked" and "Best Man"

== Episodes ==
=== Series 1 (1993) ===
No. overall	No. in series	Title	Original release date
1	1	"What the Butler Saw"	27 January 1993
When the Earl of Lisson is murdered at his country hotel, Louis and Briggs are called in to investigate. They question their suspects, including the mysterious Jerry Palmer (Jerry Hall).
2	2	"Hostage"	3 February 1993
On F.A. Cup Final day, Louis and Briggs settle in front of the television with two crates of lager, until a murderer escapes from prison. With guest star Michael Melia.
3	3	"Teed Off"	10 February 1993
The Detectives take to the fairway to investigate suspected arms dealer and keen golfer Johnny McKenna (Jimmy Tarbuck). With a promotion up for grabs, the pair are keen to impress their boss. Tony Jacklin makes a guest appearance.
4	4	"Acting Constables"	17 February 1993
Louis and Briggs take centre stage when they join the cast and crew of a TV drama as technical advisers. They fail to notice the criminal activities going on behind the scenes. Guest starring Anthony Head.
5	5	"Studs"	24 February 1993
Louis and Briggs sail for Jersey to investigate an international smuggling ring. Eager to bump up their expenses, Louis and Briggs put the investigation on hold while they soak up the sun, only to be brought firmly down to earth by local detective Jim Bergerac (John Nettles).
6	6	"Strangers in Paradise"	3 March 1993
When crime boss Tony Mazola is gunned down by mystery assassins, it seems that nothing can prevent all-out gang warfare. The killers must be caught quickly. Specially selected for this dangerous mission, Louis and Briggs are sent undercover to a notorious East End club to keep an eye on prime suspect Danny Kane (Leslie Grantham). Also starring Barry Cryer.

=== Series 2 (1994) ===
No. overall	No. in series	Title	Original release date
7	1	"Collared"	2 March 1994
Suspended after an unfortunate incident that garnered censure from the Queen, Briggs and Louis decide to regain favour by arresting some serious East End villains.
8	2	"Witness"	9 March 1994
Two tough detectives are required to go undercover at a monastery. Unable to find any, the Super employs Briggs and Louis. Guest starring Christopher Ellison.
9	3	"Never Without Protection"	16 March 1994
A Duchess keeps appearing in the tabloids canoodling with her police bodyguards. Guest starring Rula Lenska.
10	4	"Dutch Cops"	23 March 1994
On Customs and Excise duty in Felixstowe, Louis and Briggs become trapped in the back of a pilchard lorry. They find themselves in Amsterdam, in possession of a large quantity of diamonds that had been smuggled there in the lorry. Guest starring Herbert Lom.
11	5	"Sparring Partners"	30 March 1994
A natural steroid that promotes raw aggression has been developed, and the British Boxing Board of Control is worried that a certain trainer may be using it on his boxers. Briggs and Louis masquerade as the manager and trainer of a more athletically built policeman, working undercover at said trainer's gym. However, they are more interested in the drug's side effects, which include enhanced sexual prowess and drive. Guest starring Tim Healy.
12	6	"Rear Window"	6 April 1994
While Louis uses a wheelchair, he witnesses a brutal crime of passion, but has trouble convincing Briggs that it was not all in his mind. The plot closely references Hitchcock's 1954 film Rear Window.

=== Series 3 (1995) ===
No. overall	No. in series	Title	Original release date
13	1	"D.C. of Love"	9 January 1995
As a lonely and meaningless retirement beckons after 25 years on the force, the detectives are given the task of finding "The Black Widow" after a series of gruesome lonely hearts murders.
14	2	"Flash"	16 January 1995
After mixing their drinks at the policemen's ball, Louis and Briggs confront a new horror involving a flasher, a marquess and the commissioner's wife.
15	3	"Art Attack"	23 January 1995
When forced to transfer into the Fine Arts Squad, our heroes are despatched to recover the latest artistic creation of enfant terrible Hadyn Smailes – a pair of maracas, a tin of peaches and a fish tank of the artist's own urine.
16	4	"On Thin Ice"	30 January 1995
Briggs and Louis investigate an attack on a top figure skater.
17	5	"Between a Rock and a Hard Place"	6 February 1995
After 30 years of watching and waiting, Superintendent Cottam ropes Louis and Briggs into helping him catch notorious bullion thief, Ronnie Richardson. Guest starring Mike Reid.
18	6	"Twitchers"	13 February 1995
Briggs and Louis are assigned a case protecting the eggs of a newly discovered breeding pair of red kites. Their indifference turns to panic as the eggs are stolen. Guest starring Bill Oddie.

=== Special (1995) ===
No.	Title	Original release date
19	"Thicker Than Water"	21 December 1995
Louis and Briggs try to avoid being on duty over Christmas. As they settle down for Christmas dinner, a renowned criminal attempts to break in.

=== Series 4 (1996) ===
No. overall	No. in series	Title	Original release date
20	1	"The Great Escaper"	15 February 1996
Louis and Briggs are cuffed to a notoriously slippery customer as they escort him to his latest prison by train.
21	2	"Fur Coat, No Knickers"	22 February 1996
Louis and Briggs are called in to investigate a murder that has taken place during the re-creation of a medieval battle scene. However, they are more concerned with the police football quiz.
22	3	"Back to Class"	29 February 1996
Drugs are found in the locker of a girl at a private school. In an appeal against her expulsion, she claims they have been planted by her socialite classmates. Louis and Briggs are assigned to the case, but are distracted when Myrtle the Turtle, the last female member of a very rare species, dies while under their protection.
23	4	"Sacked"	7 March 1996
A new female superintendent takes over the department. She decides a clean sweep is needed and Briggs and Louis are useless so it is time for them to go. Surely this isn't the end for the bumbling duo?
24	5	"The Wembley Stadium Mystery"	14 March 1996
D.C. Boyle, the son of the commissioner, has joined the police force and his father has ordered that he not be treated any different from the others. So Frank puts him with Briggs and Louis, who are assigned to guard Wembley Stadium that weekend. However, they have their minds on winning the police table football tournament.

=== Series 5 (1997) ===
No. overall	No. in series	Title	Original release date
25	1	"Special Branch"	14 January 1997
The Superintendent selects the duo for a particularly sensitive assignment. His granddaughter has become involved in an anti-road protest and he needs Louis and Briggs to "rescue" her.
26	2	"Cardiac Arrest"	21 January 1997
A gang member is shot by police during a getaway and is unconscious in hospital. The gang leader wants to ensure that he does not incriminate anyone by killing him before he comes round. Briggs and Louis are assigned to protect the unconscious gang member while he is in hospital – giving Bob all sorts of opportunities to express his hypochondria.
27	3	"The Beast of Hackney Marshes"	28 January 1997
Louis and Briggs spend a night patrolling the marshes, on the lookout for an escaped bear.
28	4	"The Curse of the Comanches"	4 February 1997
When Briggs and Louis, helped by a mysterious Comanche Chief, go on the hunt for a sacred Indian carving, they soon find themselves on the trail of tragedy, death and disaster.
29	5	"Best Man"	11 February 1997
Much to his surprise, Briggs is asked to be best man at a colleague's wedding.
30	6	"Mine's a Large One"	18 February 1997
Briggs and Louis have found their true vocation during a job swap scheme – the river police. With peace, quiet and the total absence of any kind of crime, it seems like paradise, until they encounter an unexploded World War II river mine.

=== Special (1997) ===
No.	Title	Original release date
31	"Go West Old Man"	28 December 1997
After years of stress due to being responsible for useless bungling detectives, Chief Superintendent Cottam suddenly disappears. Louis and Briggs follow his trail all the way to Canada to try to get him to come back. The episode ends with all three protagonists leaving the police force: Cottam on medical grounds, Briggs and Louis to take over a pub in Canada.

== DVD releases ==
- Series 1 – June 2006
- Series 2 – September 2006
- Series 3 – October 2006
- Series 4 and "Thicker Than Water" – February 2007
- Series 5 and "Go West, Old Man" – April 2007
- The Complete Collection – 12 November 2007
