= Taboo (2017 TV series) =

British television drama series

- Genre: Historical fiction; Crime drama; Thriller
- Created by: Steven Knight; Tom Hardy; Chips Hardy
- Written by: Steven Knight
- Story by: Tom Hardy; Chips Hardy
- Directed by: Kristoffer Nyholm; Anders Engström
- Starring: Tom Hardy; Leo Bill; Jessie Buckley; Oona Chaplin; Mark Gatiss; Tom Hollander; Stephen Graham; Jefferson Hall; David Hayman; Ed Hogg; Michael Kelly; Jonathan Pryce; Jason Watkins; Nicholas Woodeson; Franka Potente
- Composer: Max Richter
- Country of origin: United Kingdom
- Original language: English
- No. of series: 1
- No. of episodes: 8

Production
- Executive producers: Tom Hardy; Ridley Scott; Liza Marshall; Kate Crowe; Dean Baker; Steven Knight; Tom Lesinski
- Producer: Tim Bricknell
- Cinematography: Mark Patten
- Editors: Serkan Nihat; Matt Platts-Mills; Guy Bensley; Kate Weiland; Jason Krascucki; Beverly Mills
- Running time: 58–61 minutes
- Production companies: Scott Free Productions; Hardy Son & Baker; Sonar Entertainment; BBC; FXP

Original release
- Network: BBC One (UK); FX (US)
- Release: 7 January – 25 February 2017

Taboo is a BBC television drama series produced by Scott Free London and Hardy Son & Baker. It premiered on BBC One in the United Kingdom, on 7 January 2017 and on FX in the United States, on 10 January 2017. The eight-episode series was created by Steven Knight, Tom Hardy, and his father, Chips Hardy, based on a story written by Tom and Chips Hardy.

In 1814, adventurer and businessman James Delaney (Tom Hardy) returns to England having spent twelve years in Africa, following the death of his father and the approaching end of Great Britain's 1812 war with the United States. Taboo explores the dark side of 19th-century London, political and business corruption involving the East India Company, criminal gangs, and the misery of the working class.

Kristoffer Nyholm and Anders Engström each directed four episodes of the first series. Max Richter composed the score.

The series has received generally favourable reviews, with critics praising Hardy's performance, visual presentation, and pacing.

== Cast ==
=== Main ===
- Tom Hardy as James Keziah Delaney, Horace Delaney's son
- Leo Bill as Benjamin Wilton, a records officer with the East India Company
- Jessie Buckley as Lorna Delaney (née Bow), Horace's widow
- Oona Chaplin as Zilpha Geary (née Delaney), James Delaney's half-sister and lover
- Stephen Graham as Atticus, an underworld informant to Delaney
- Jefferson Hall as Thorne Geary, Zilpha's husband and an insurance broker
- David Hayman as Brace, Horace Delaney's loyal servant
- Edward Hogg as Michael Godfrey, minute taker with the East India Company
- Franka Potente as Helga von Hinten, a brothel madam
- Michael Kelly as Edgar Dumbarton, an American physician at St Bartholomew's Hospital and spy
- Tom Hollander as George Cholmondeley, a chemist and scientist
- Marina Hands as Countess Musgrove/Carlsbad, an American spymaster in London
- Jonathan Pryce as Sir Stuart Strange, Chairman of the East India Company
- Jason Watkins as Solomon Coop, Private Secretary to the Sovereign
- Mark Gatiss as Prince George, Prince Regent during the King's mental illness.
- Nicholas Woodeson as Robert Thoyt, Delaney's solicitor

=== Recurring ===
- Edward Fox as Horace Delaney, the deceased owner of a shipping company based in London
- Ruby-May Martinwood as Winter, Helga's daughter
- Scroobius Pip as French Bill, the assistant to Atticus
- Fiona Skinner as Brighton, a member of Atticus's gang.
- Christopher Fairbank as Ibbotson, Delaney's tenant farmer
- Richard Dixon as Edmund Pettifer, Africa desk, East India Company
- Roger Ashton-Griffiths as Abraham Appleby, East India Company
- Danny Ligairi as Martinez, a Polynesian associate of Delaney
- Lucian Msamati as George Chichester, a Sons of Africa lawyer
- Louis Ashbourne Serkis as Robert, James Delaney's half-brother

== Production ==
Taboo was created by Steven Knight, Tom Hardy and his father, Edward "Chips" Hardy, and is based on a story written by Tom and Chips Hardy. Knight and Tom Hardy previously worked together in the 2013 film Locke and the TV series Peaky Blinders, which premiered in 2013. The first series was directed by Kristoffer Nyholm and Anders Engström. The music was composed by Max Richter. Steven Knight plans for two more series. Taboo was renewed for a second series in March 2017. In November 2021, Knight confirmed that six of season two's eight planned episodes had been written, and the start of filming is contingent upon Hardy's schedule. In May 2022, Knight earmarked the end of 2023 as a potential filming start date. In March 2023, producer Dean Baker stated that the second season of Taboo was being worked on; no release date has been announced.

== Episodes ==
No.	Title	Directed by	Written by	Original release date	UK viewers (millions)
1	"Episode 1"	Kristoffer Nyholm	Steven Knight	7 January 2017	7.00
James Delaney, believed dead, returns to London to attend the funeral of his father, Horace. Other than owning a small part of the west coast of North America, Horace has left nothing of value. The land, Nootka Sound, is in dispute between Great Britain and the United States, who are at war. The East India Company had an agreement to buy the land from Zilpha Geary, Delaney's half-sister, but Delaney knows the war is coming to an end, greatly increasing the value of the land, and scorns their offer. Delaney discovers his father died from arsenic poisoning.
2	"Episode 2"	Kristoffer Nyholm	Steven Knight	14 January 2017	6.18
Delaney sets about reclaiming his inheritance; he buys a ship at auction, then begins to assemble his crew. The reading of Horace's will concludes with the appearance of Lorna Bow, a London actress, who claims that she and Horace were married. Delaney pays off Horace's numerous creditors, and makes contact with Dr Dumbarton. The East India Company plot Delaney's murder. The man with the silver tooth stabs Delaney, who despite severe injuries manages to kill the man.
3	"Episode 3"	Kristoffer Nyholm	Steven Knight	21 January 2017	5.57
After Dumbarton administers to Delaney's wound, his assistance regarding Nootka Sound is made clear. Delaney protects his life against the East India Company and the Crown by making the United States government the beneficiary of his will. When Lorna makes claim for half of Horace's assets, she is warned that her life is at risk and she should flee to Paris. Michael Godfrey is blackmailed by Delaney to provide secrets from the East India Company's meetings. Lorna is abducted after leaving the theatre, only to be rescued by Delaney.
4	"Episode 4"	Kristoffer Nyholm	Steven Knight and Emily Ballou	28 January 2017	5.36
Lorna, encouraged by Delaney, allows herself to be arrested by the Crown. About to be raped by Coop, she is rescued when the East India Company intervene, having been tipped off by Delaney about the duke's threat to Lorna. Cholmondeley advises Delaney on gunpowder. They plan to steal refined saltpetre from a Company warehouse. An attempt to kill Delaney, instigated by the US secret agent Carlsbad, ends with the disembowelment of his attacker. When Delaney is invited to a ball held by the Countess Musgrove, he asks Lorna to accompany him. Although she neither confirms nor denies it, he realises that Musgrove is Carlsbad. Thorne, under the influence from laughing gas provided by Cholmondeley, challenges Delaney to a duel to the death.
5	"Episode 5"	Anders Engström	Steven Knight and Ben Hervey	4 February 2017	5.63
When Thorne's shot at Delaney's chest proves to have been sabotaged, Delaney fires at the second, Mr. Hope, killing him. Because the Crown had purchased the saltpetre, the Company pay the consequence for the theft. The Prince Regent decides to make matters difficult for the Company and sends George Chichester, a lawyer for the Sons of Africa, to investigate the sinking of the Influence, the slave ship that has been haunting Delaney's memories and on which 280 people died. Dumbarton tells Delaney that the Americans know about his hidden farm. Lorna has followed Delaney's instructions and brought him his father's trunk; he finds the treaty that proves Nootka Sound was bought from the natives, rather than taken by force. Delaney believes that his father bought his mother, a Nootka woman, for beads.
6	"Episode 6"	Anders Engström	Edward "Chips" Hardy and Steven Knight	11 February 2017	5.43
George Chichester discovers that the slave ship's original name was changed to 'Influence' to disguise her real identity; she was registered as being empty when she sailed on her fatal voyage; she had only a skeleton crew and Sir Stuart Strange's brother owned a sugar plantation in Antigua. Meanwhile, Brace tells Delaney that his mother was confined to an asylum after attempting to drown him as a baby; his father saved his life. Zilpha murders Thorne, and Delaney has Dumbarton remove the corpse, which is buried in a Catholic funeral. Farmer Ibbotson makes his confession to a Catholic priest, who reveals the location of Delaney's gunpowder factory to the Company. Delaney kills Ibbotson, leaving his body in the confessional. Before the Company's soldiers can seize his gunpowder, Delaney removes it by barge and transports it to his ship. Company representative Benjamin Wilton finds Delaney at the dock and passes on a message from Sir Stuart that it is now war between them. Delaney's ship then explodes, leaving it a flaming hulk. Delaney kills the man who was supposed to be guarding the ship and gets drunk. The following morning, he wakes up in the mud and finds Winter's dead body nearby.
7	"Episode 7"	Anders Engström	Steven Knight	18 February 2017	5.53
Following Winter's funeral, Delaney is fearful that he may have killed her whilst drunk. Unlike Helga, Lorna believes in his innocence, especially as he houses another young waif, Robert. Delaney is visited by Chichester, who accuses him of complicity in sinking the slave ship but offers immunity if he will indict the East India Company. Brace makes a confession to Delaney: it was he who had poisoned Horace, starting the chain of events that followed. Meanwhile, a vengeful Helga informs Strange about the gunpowder, leading to Delaney being imprisoned for treason and tortured. Lorna does her own sleuthing to prove James innocent of killing Winter, whilst Delaney's ally in the Company, Godfrey, agrees to testify against it, requiring George to spirit him away for his own safety. With the Prince Regent still at odds with the East India Company, Delaney is surprised to find Strange offering him a compromise.
8	"Episode 8"	Anders Engström	Steven Knight	25 February 2017	5.59
In prison awaiting trial, Delaney lets Strange know he is aware of his part in the sinking of the slave ship, a fact Godfrey will reveal to the Royal Commission, thus forcing Strange to arrange his release. Delaney is distraught to find that Zilpha has killed herself. Lorna and Atticus also rescue Helga, telling her that Delaney was framed by the East India Company for Winter's murder. Delaney settles business with Dumbarton, revealed to be a double agent for the Company, on behalf of the Americans. The Prince Regent, scorned by Delaney's repeated slights against him, orders his death. Delaney, Lorna, Atticus, Michael and their associates prepare for an ambush against the Prince Regent's forces. After a long protracted battle, they escape on the ship Strange has arranged for them, at the cost of Helga's life. George Chichester, guided by a now-free Brace, finds the evidence he needs to ultimately discredit the East India Company. Strange is killed by an explosive device planted by Delaney, completing his revenge. On the ship, the Union Jack is taken down and the Stars and Stripes is raised, signifying their new destinies as Americans.

== Broadcast ==
Taboo premiered on BBC One in the United Kingdom on 7 January 2017, and on FX in the United States on 10 January 2017. The debut episode had 1.839 million viewers in the US, and a rating of 0.6 for the 18–49 demographic. Its Live+3 figures were 3.43 million viewers – 1.63 million adults in the category 18–49 – the time-shifted percentage increase of 101% in the demographic is a record for FX. In the US, the first season averaged per episode 1.33 million viewers and 0.4 rating in the 18–49 demographic on the episodes initial airings, but increased to 5.8 million viewers per episode after viewing figures from all platforms had been added, including on-air replays, delayed viewing and streaming.

== Reception ==
The series has received generally favourable reviews, with critics praising Hardy's performance, the aesthetic and the slow burn aspect. The review aggregator Rotten Tomatoes gives the series an approval rating of 78% based on 45 reviews, with an average rating of 7.03/10. Their critical consensus reads, "After a sluggish start, Taboo takes a hold as a mysterious, dark, and often brutal period drama with plenty of promise as a series – most notably Tom Hardy's exceptionally watchable performance". On review aggregator Metacritic, the series has a score of 67 out of 100 based on 32 critics, indicating "generally favorable reviews".

Ben Lawrence of The Telegraph gave Taboo 3 out of 5 stars, stating that Taboo's strength is that, despite borrowing from westerns, gangster flicks and even Charles Dickens, it still manages to feel utterly original. Sam Wollaston of The Guardian noted that while some of the dialogue "does make you wince", Hardy's acting and onscreen presence more than makes up for it.

Writing for The Hollywood Reporter, Tim Goodman noted that Taboo is a solid entry, if slow in the early going, in FX's stable of series, with a compelling turn by Tom Hardy. Kevin Yeoman of Screenrant wrote in his review that it all added up to a dark, slow-moving but nonetheless intriguing drama with secrets to dispense in due time. He also said that it was likely that those drawn to Hardy's onscreen intensity and seemingly unlimited capacity to become the physical embodiment of gloomy menace would be the ones most likely to stick around until the very end, and in doing so would reap the potential rewards.

Some historians have expressed concern that the East India Company may be portrayed inaccurately. Before the broadcast of Taboo, Steven Knight said, "This man, James Delaney, is a deeply flawed and deeply troubled human being. His greatest struggle will be against the East India Company which, throughout the 19th century, was the equivalent of the CIA, the NSA, and the biggest, baddest multinational corporation on earth, all rolled into one self-righteous, religiously-motivated monolith." Tirthankar Roy, an economic historian at the London School of Economics, argued that it gave an excessively negative view of the East India Company. Nick Robins, author of The Corporation That Changed the World, added that the organisation had made a positive contribution, but that by the time it was dissolved it had long "outlived its usefulness".

=== Awards and nominations ===
Year	Award	Category	Nominee(s)	Result	Ref.
2017	Primetime Emmy Awards	Outstanding Music Composition for a Series	Max Richter	Nominated	
2017	Primetime Emmy Awards	Outstanding Special Visual Effects in a Supporting Role	Henry Badgett, Tracy McCreary, Angela Barson, Lucy Ainsworth-Taylor, Nic Birmingham, Simon Rowe, Alexander Kirichenko, Finlay Duncan, Colin Gorry	Nominated	
2017	Royal Television Society Craft & Design Awards	Costume Design - Drama	Joanna Eatwell	Won	
2017	Royal Television Society Craft & Design Awards	Design - Trails & Packaging	BBC Marketing Team	Nominated	
2017	Royal Television Society Craft & Design Awards	Make Up Design - Drama	Erika Okvist, Jan Archibald, Audrey Doyle	Won	
2017	Royal Television Society Craft & Design Awards	Music - Original Title	Max Richter	Nominated	
2017	Royal Television Society Craft & Design Awards	Production Design - Drama	Sonja Klaus	Nominated	
2017	Royal Television Society Craft & Design Awards	Sound - Drama	Sound Team	Won	
2018	Satellite Awards	Best Drama Series	Taboo	Nominated	
2018	Satellite Awards	Best Actor in a Drama / Genre Series	Tom Hardy	Nominated	
2018	16th Visual Effects Society Awards	Outstanding Supporting Visual Effects in a Photoreal Episode	Henry Badgett, Tracy McCreary, Nic Birmingham, Simon Rowe, Colin Gorry for "Pilot"	Nominated	
2018	British Academy Television Craft Awards	Best Costume Design	Joanna Eatwell	Nominated	
2018	British Academy Television Craft Awards	Best Make Up & Hair Design	Jan Archivald, Erika Ökvist, Audrey Doyle	Won	
2018	British Academy Television Craft Awards	Best Original Music	Max Richter	Nominated	
2018	British Academy Television Craft Awards	Best Photography: Fiction	Mark Patten	Nominated	
2018	British Academy Television Craft Awards	Best Special, Visual & Graphic Effects	Adam Glasman, Rob Pizzey	Nominated	
2018	British Academy Television Craft Awards	Best Sound: Fiction	Sound Team	Nominated	

== Home media ==
Season 1 was released in the United States and Canada by Echo Bridge Acquisition Corp, LLC (Echo Bridge Home Entertainment) on DVD and Blu-Ray on February 6, 2018, and in Europe by StudioCanal on May 29, 2017. The US/Canada DVD set consists of two discs while the European release is a three disc set. French and German dubbed releases were released on April 13, 2017, and May 9, 2017, respectively.
