= All About Me =

British television sitcom

- Genre: Sitcom
- Created by: Steven Knight
- Starring: Jasper Carrott; Meera Syal; Nina Wadia; Ryan Cartwright; Natalia Cappuccini
- Country of origin: United Kingdom
- Original language: English
- No. of series: 3
- No. of episodes: 22

Production
- Running time: 30 minutes
- Production company: Celador Productions

Original release
- Network: BBC One
- Release: 8 March 2002 – 29 October 2004

All About Me is a British television sitcom starring Jasper Carrott about a multicultural family living in Birmingham. It was broadcast on BBC One from 8 March 2002 to 29 October 2004. All About Me was created by Steven Knight, who also wrote two of the early episodes.

== Plot ==
The sitcom is based around a modern family who live in the Midlands. The family consists of Colin Craddock, a white Brummie builder, and his Asian wife Rupinder. Colin's two sons from his first marriage, Peter and Leo, share the house, as do Rupinder's half-sister Sima, daughter Kavita and son Raj, a wheelchair user with cerebral palsy. The 'me' in the title was Raj, and his thoughts were heard in a voiceover.

At the end of the first series Colin and Rupinder had their own child. The third series saw the introduction of two new characters called Charles and Miranda, whose attempts at political correctness proved untactful.

== Cast ==
- Jasper Carrott – Colin Craddock
- Meera Syal – Rupinder Craddock (series 1)
- Nina Wadia – Rupinder Craddock (series 2 and 3)
- Jamil Dhillon – Raj
- Ryan Cartwright – Peter Craddock
- Natalia Cappuccini – Sima
- Robert Cartin – Leo Craddock
- Alina Iqbal – Kavita
- Jonty Stephens – Billy
- Richard Lumsden – Charles (series 3)
- Amanda Root – Miranda (series 3)
- Luke Allder – Voice of Raj (series 2 and 3)

== Episodes ==
=== Series One (2002) ===
1. Episode One (8 March 2002)
2. Episode Two (15 March 2002)
3. Episode Three (22 March 2002)
4. Episode Four (29 March 2002)
5. Episode Five (5 April 2002)
6. Episode Six (12 April 2002)

=== Series Two (2003) ===
1. "A Safe Pair of Hands" (17 October 2003)
2. "The Green-Eyed Monster" (24 October 2003)
3. "Look Who's Talking" (31 October 2003)
4. "What's in a Name?" (7 November 2003)
5. "Thick as Thieves" (14 November 2003)
6. "A Flying Visit" (28 November 2003)
7. "Quiet Night In" (5 December 2003)
8. "Life's a Beach" (12 December 2003)

=== Series Three (2004) ===
1. "The Name Game" (10 September 2004)
2. "The First Mrs Craddock" (17 September 2004)
3. "Downloading" (24 September 2004)
4. "Badmarsh" (1 October 2004)
5. "Little Voice" (8 October 2004)
6. "A Dog Called Wonga" (15 October 2004)
7. "Where There's Blame" (22 October 2004)
8. "Best Laid Plans" (29 October 2004)

== Title song ==
The title song was written by Gary Judd and Nick Ryan and performed by Catherine Porter. Incidental music was written by Garry Judd.
