= Malcolm Stent =

English actor (1945–2024)

Malcolm John Stent BEM (born 14 June 1945, Saltley, Birmingham, England, died 11 March 2024) was an English actor, musical performer and playwright, who lived in Solihull. He was in a band called the Timoneers, before he became a regular at The Boggery with Jasper Carrott. He continued to perform around the Midlands ever since. He was awarded a British Empire Medal in the 2017 New Year Honours for services to entertainment and charity in Solihull.

He also presented a popular lunchtime radio show "In the Barmaids Arms" on Radio WM. The barmaid "Rosie" was portrayed by Mary Kendall (died 2015) while the pub background sounds were created in the studio.
