= Bronson (film) =

2008 film directed by Nicolas Winding Refn

- UK theatrical release poster
- Directed by: Nicolas Winding Refn
- Written by: Brock Norman Brock; Nicolas Winding Refn
- Produced by: Rupert Preston; Danny Hansford
- Starring: Tom Hardy
- Cinematography: Larry Smith
- Edited by: Matthew Newman
- Music by: Johnny Jewel
- Production companies: Vertigo Films; Aramid Entertainment; Str8jacket Creations; EM Media; 4DH Films
- Distributed by: Vertigo Distribution
- Release dates: 17 October 2008 (BFI London Film Festival); 13 March 2009 (United Kingdom)
- Running time: 92 minutes
- Country: United Kingdom
- Language: English
- Budget: $230,000
- Box office: $2.7 million

Bronson is a 2008 British biographical prison black comedy film directed by Nicolas Winding Refn, based on a script written by Refn and Brock Norman Brock. The film stars Tom Hardy as Michael Peterson, known from 1987 as Charles Bronson. The film follows the life of this prisoner, considered Britain's most violent criminal, who has been responsible for a dozen or so cases of hostage taking while incarcerated. The film received positive reviews from critics.

== Plot ==
Michael Peterson narrates his early life with self-deprecating humour. Initially, he addresses the camera dressed in prison garb. At other times, he tells his tale in a vaudeville-style theatre with a live audience.

In 1974, at 22, he robs a post office, leading to his first prison sentence of seven years. At sentencing, his mother hopes he will be out in four, but his violence in prison extends his sentence. He is sent to a psychiatric hospital the following year, where he continues to rebel and is administered drugs which he claims make him physically weak.

In 1978, Peterson decides to escape by earning a transfer back to prison, and he attempts to strangle a detainee who revealed himself to be a paedophile, but is apprehended before he can kill the man. He comments to the audience that despite all his prison time and solitary confinement, he has never killed anyone.

In the vaudeville theatre, he shows film footage of a rooftop protest in 1982 during which he claims to have caused "tens of millions of pounds' damage". He credits this destruction with the government's decision to declare him "sane" and have him released in 1987. After a brief reunion with his parents, he sets off to see his predatory Uncle Jack. He is welcomed and reintroduced to an old prison mate who promises to set him up as a bare-knuckle boxer, and gives him the name Charles Bronson, after the American actor.

On 1 January 1988, he proposes to a woman and steals a £1,000 ring in the hope that she will marry him, but she reveals he was just a fling. On 7 January, on his sixty-ninth day free, Bronson is sent back to jail.

In 1993, he takes a prison librarian hostage and waits for reinforcements to arrive, alternately screaming at his hostage and peaceably enquiring after his family. When officers arrive, he strips naked and forces the librarian to assist in applying his "body armour" of petroleum jelly, to make him harder to grab in the imminent brawl. After being restrained, he is warned by the prison governor that he will die inside if his behaviour does not improve.

In 1999, encouraged by a prison art teacher, who notices something special in his drawings, he becomes a model prisoner for a while, channelling his confusion and pain into vivid imagery of birds and grotesque creatures. When told that the art studio will be closing, Bronson attacks the teacher and holds him hostage.

While prison officials wait outside, he demands music be played. He paints his naked body black and ties the teacher to a post. He paints a moustache onto the teacher's face, forces an apple into his mouth and removes his hat and glasses to put on the teacher's head in an imitation of the René Magritte painting The Son of Man.

After this human still-life has been arranged to his satisfaction, he accepts his fate and calls for the prison officers to burst in for yet another brawl, for which he is sent back to solitary confinement, naked and heavily beaten.

Onscreen text reveals that Bronson has spent thirty years of his sentence in solitary confinement, has no planned release date, and, as of the early 2000s, is considered Britain's most dangerous prisoner.

== Cast ==
- Tom Hardy as Michael Gordon Peterson / Charles Bronson
- Matt King as Paul Daniels, nightclub owner and former fellow prisoner
- James Lance as Phil Danielson, prison art teacher
- Amanda Burton as Charlie's mother
- Kelly Adams as Irene Peterson, Charlie's wife
- Juliet Oldfield as Alison, Charlie's lover
- Jonathan Phillips as the Prison Governor
- Mark Powley as Prison Officer Andy Love
- Hugh Ross as Uncle Jack
- Luing Andrews as Prison Officer
- Joe Tucker as John White, fellow patient in Rampton
- Gordon Brown as Screw, the first guard Bronson fights
- Charlie Whyman as fellow patient in Rampton

== Production ==
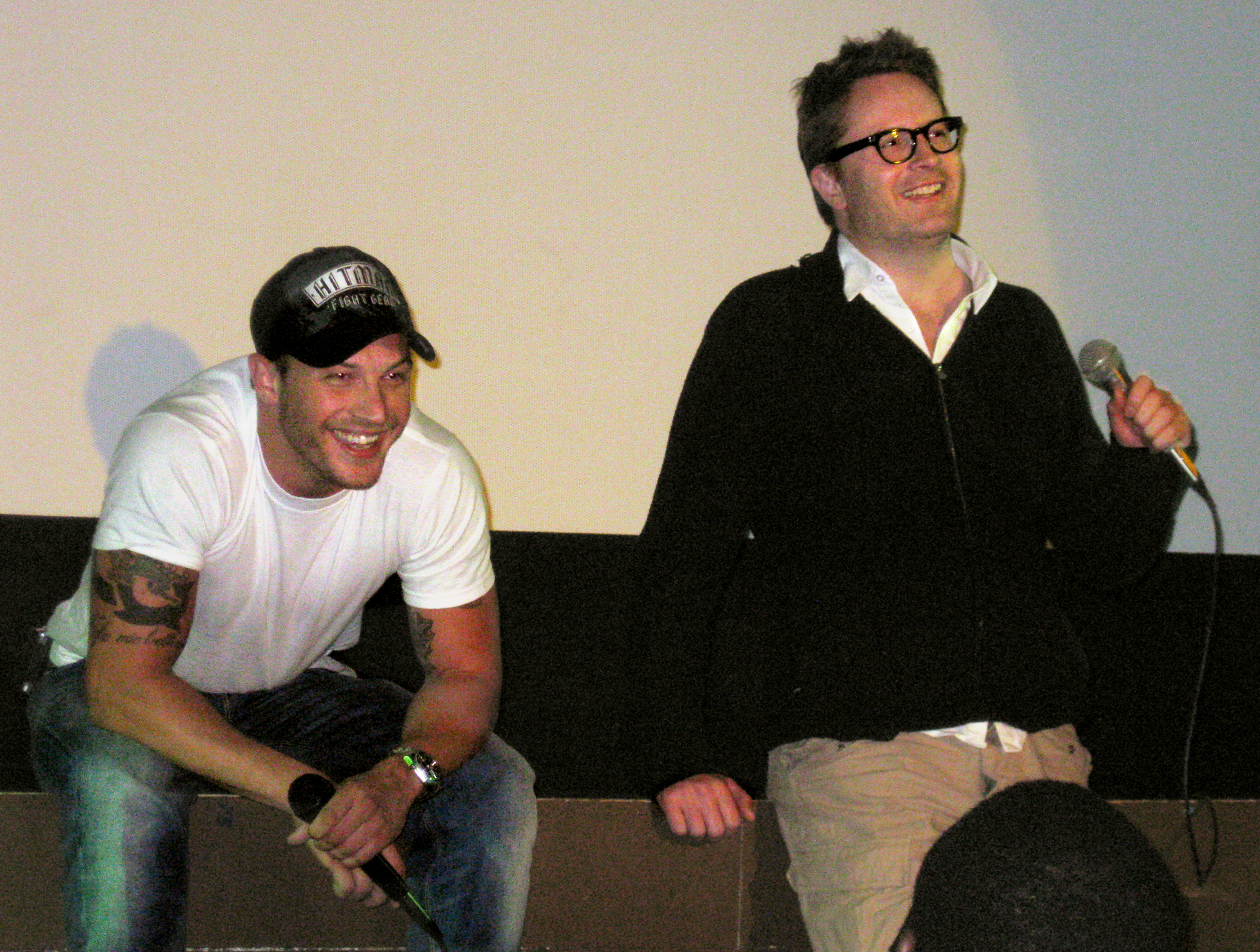
Hardy and director Nicolas Winding Refn promoting Bronson, 2009

For the role, Hardy had telephone conversations with Charles Bronson, before meeting him. Bronson was so impressed by how Hardy had managed to build up his physique for the role and how good he was at imitating him, that he shaved off his trademark moustache for it to be used as a prop for Hardy to wear in the film. "I honestly believe nobody on the planet could play me as Tom did. He is more like me than I am", Bronson told The Times. Filming was done in and around the St. Ann's and Sherwood districts of Nottingham, and Worksop and Welbeck Abbey in north Nottinghamshire.

In a late 2009 interview with Michael Slenske of Interview magazine, Tom Hardy discussed the fitness routine he had developed to get in shape to play Bronson,

SLENSKE: But you were doing some crazy training for that too, like 2,500 push-ups a day? HARDY: No, Charlie does 2,500 push-ups a day, I didn't do that. I had to put on a lot of weight as quick as possible and I only had five weeks to do it, and a lot of that was fat. I ate everything. To be honest, I lost about 14 pounds of fat on this last film [Warrior] and gained 28 pounds of muscle. I was heavier than I was on Bronson.

== Reception ==
=== Box office ===
Bronson grossed $2,260,712 at the box office.

=== Critical response ===
Upon release, Bronson received positive reviews, with many praising Hardy's performance, the film's writing and direction, as well as the humour and the action sequences, though it was criticised for its violence. Rotten Tomatoes, a review aggregator, gives the film an approval rating of 75% based on reviews from 80 critics, with an average rating of 6.8/10 with the consensus "Undeniably gripping, Bronson forces the viewer to make some hard decisions about where the line between art and exploitation lies." Metacritic gives the film a "generally favourable" average score of 71 out of 100 based on 22 reviews.

Roger Ebert gave the film three stars out of four and praised the decision not to attempt to rationalise and explain Bronson's behaviour, stating in his review:

"I suppose, after all, Nicolas Winding Refn, the director and co-writer of Bronson, was wise to leave out any sort of an explanation. Can you imagine how you'd cringe if the film ended in a flashback of little Mickey undergoing childhood trauma? There is some human behavior beyond our ability to comprehend. I was reading a theory the other day that a few people just happen to be pure evil. I'm afraid I believe it. They lack any conscience, any sense of pity or empathy for their victims. But Bronson is his own victim. How do you figure that?"

Bronson was not initially allowed to view the film, but had said that if his mother liked it, he was sure he would as well. According to Refn's DVD audio commentary, his mother said she loved it. On 15 November 2011, he was granted permission to view it. Describing it as "theatrical, creative, and brilliant", Bronson heaped praise upon Hardy, but disagreed on the implied distance between himself and his father, and the portrayal of Paul Edmunds, a former prisoner and nightclub owner (portrayed in the film by Matt King as Paul Daniels) as "a bit of a ponce".

Bronson challenged his own family's reaction to the portrayal of his Uncle Jack, stating that he "loved" it, as would Jack himself. Bronson's trust in Hardy's acting grew such that once he had seen the film, he said, "If I were to die in jail then at least I live on through Britain's No 1 actor". Bronson was originally displeased with the choice of Hardy as the star, but during their first meeting in person, Hardy assured him that he would "fix it".

Bronson is often cited as having many stylistic and thematic similarities to Stanley Kubrick's A Clockwork Orange, including homages to many specific scenes in the latter film. While not a direct remake or sequel, Bronson borrows visual and narrative elements from Kubrick's film, particularly in its presentation of violence and its exploration of a protagonist grappling with societal control and individual expression.
