= Chips Hardy =

British writer (born 1950)

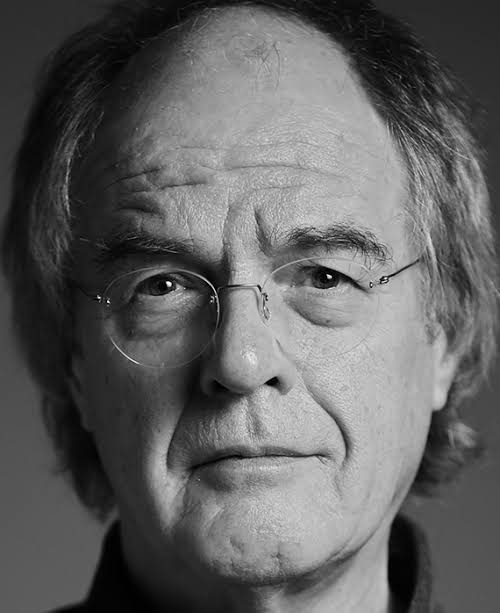
- Hardy in 2018
- Born: Edward John Hardy; 23 January 1950 (age 76); London, England
- Occupations: Novelist; playwright; screenwriter
- Spouse: Elizabeth Ann Hardy
- Children: Tom Hardy
- Relatives: Charlotte Riley (daughter-in-law)

Edward John "Chips" Hardy (born 23 January 1950) is an English author. He and his wife Elizabeth Ann are the parents of actor Tom Hardy, with whom Hardy worked on BBC One's 2017 drama series Taboo, as the co-creator, a writer and a consulting producer.

== Career ==
Alongside a career in advertising as a creative director, Hardy has written for television, film, theatre, novels and stand-up material. Productions include a children’s television series with a talking chair called Helping Henry and About Face, a television drama with Maureen Lipman. He also won a British Comedy Award for his work with Irish comedian Dave Allen.

In 2007, Hardy’s novel Each Day A Small Victory was published in the form of frontline dispatches from amongst the embattled wildlife in an English country lay-by, illustrated by Oscar Grillo.

Blue on Blue, Hardy’s darkly comic play on self-harm, was first showcased at the Latchmere 503 in London in 2007. The play was revived in 2016 at the Tristan Bates in London in partnership with BLESMA, the British Limbless Ex-serviceman’s Association. In 2008, Hardy’s one woman dysfunctional Cabaret, There’s Something In The Fridge that Wants To Kill Me!, ran notably at the Edinburgh Festival.

In 2009, inspired by an idea from his son Tom, he and Tom created the story that was to become the 2017 eight-part series Taboo. Hardy is the co-creator, a writer and a consulting producer. His work on the screenplay for Taboo earned him the Writer’s Guild of Great Britain award for Best Long Form TV Drama in 2018.

In March 2023, work on the second season of Taboo was announced.
