= Jasper Carrott =

British comedian (born 1945)

Jasper Carrott OBE
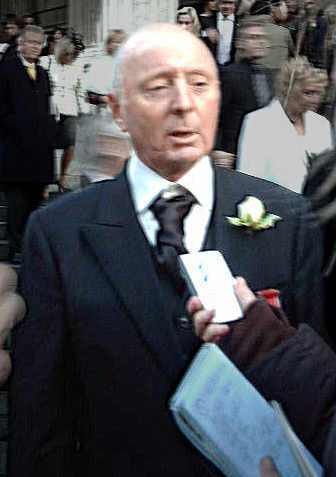
- Carrott in 2006
- Born: Robert Norman Davis; 14 March 1945 (age 81); Birmingham, England
- Occupations: Comedian, writer, actor, singer, television presenter
- Spouse: Hazel Jackson (m. 1972)
- Children: 4, including Lucy Davis

Comedy career
- Years active: 1969–2005 (singer); 1975–present (comedian)
- Medium: Stand-up, television, game show host
- Website: jaspercarrott.com

Robert Norman Davis (born 14 March 1945), known by his stage name Jasper Carrott, is an English comedian, writer, actor, singer and television presenter. His credits include An Audience with Jasper Carrott (1978), The Secret Policeman's Other Ball (1982), Carrott's Lib (1982–1983), Jane and the Lost City (1987), Carrott's Commercial Breakdown (1989–1996), Canned Carrott (1990–1995), The Detectives (1993–1997), All About Me (2002–2004), and Golden Balls (2007–2009).

== Early life ==
Born Robert Norman Davis at 10.30am on 14 March 1945, in Birmingham, England, Carrott was educated at Acocks Green Primary School, and Moseley Grammar School. He worked as a trainee buyer at a city centre department store the Beehive, with schoolmate and ELO member Bev Bevan, who would remain a lifelong friend.

He acquired the nickname Jasper aged nine and added the surname Carrott when he was 17.

== Career ==
In February 1969, Carrott started his own folk club, "The Boggery", in nearby Solihull with his friend Les Ward. Carrott performed folk songs and as an MC. His banter overtook the songs and he became more a comedian than a singer. He also worked as a musical agent (with John Starkey, who was his manager from 1974 to 1992), as Fingimigig, managing among others Harvey Andrews. He toured UK rugby clubs. He recorded an album in 1973 called Jasper Carrott – In the Club, which he sold from his van. The album contained the original "Magic Roundabout", although mainly material used in his next three LPs (such as "Hare Krishna", "Car Insurance", "Bastity Chelt", and "Hava Nagila") plus the Fred Wedlock song "The Folker".

Carrott had a UK Top 5 chart hit in August 1975 for DJM Records, with the novelty double A-side record, "Funky Moped" / "Magic Roundabout", written by Chris Rohmann and produced by Jeff Lynne, with Bev Bevan on drums and backing vocals on the former track, recorded at Grosvenor Road Studios.

By the late 1970s, Carrott had developed anecdotal sketches which he still performs. Often they purport to be autobiographical; many celebrate the Birmingham accent and culture, including his support of Birmingham City.

His live performances were recorded as Jasper Carrott Rabbitts on and on and on... and Carrott in Notts. "The Football Match" describing a visit to Old Trafford, "The Nutter on the Bus" (including the cry "Has anybody seen my camel?"), "The Mole" ("There's only one way to get rid of a mole – blow its bloody head off!") and "Zits" – an explanation of American slang for spots that brought the word into use in Britain.

In 1979, he published A Little Zit on the Side, a humorous autobiography. The follow-up, Sweet and Sour Labrador, mixed sections of stand-up routines with similar autobiographical material, much of it related to his world travels.

Carrott was the compere for the Birmingham Heart Beat Charity Concert 1986, which featured local bands such as Electric Light Orchestra and the Moody Blues, with a finale that included George Harrison.

His first appearance on television was a half-hour show for BBC Midlands on 11 August 1975, in a programme about local football called "The Golden Game". In 1976, he appeared in A Half Hour Mislaid with Jasper Carrott. He followed in 1978 with LWT's An Audience with Jasper Carrott, This partnership with LWT continued with The Unrecorded Jasper Carrott (1979), and Beat the Carrott (1981).

In 1982, Carrott moved to the BBC for Carrott's Lib (1982-1983), Carrott's Commercial Breakdown (1989-1996), which broadcast weird adverts from around the world, and the sketch and stand-up shows Carrott Confidential (1987-1989), 24 Carrott Gold (1990), The Jasper Carrott Trial (1996-1997), and Canned Carrott (1990-1991). One popular sketch involved Carrott reading out genuine, but bizarre motor insurance claim statements, such as "I drove out of my drive at 7am and drove straight into a bus. The bus was ten minutes early."

Carrott played Heinrich in the 1987 British comedy film Jane and the Lost City.

Canned Carrott also featured a spoof police drama called The Detectives, co-starring Robert Powell, which later was made into a series. From 2002 to 2004, he starred in the sitcom All About Me. In a twelve-week run in the summer of 2002, he played the part of Ko-Ko in comic opera The Mikado, written by Gilbert and Sullivan at the Savoy Theatre in London.

Carrott performed in several of The Secret Policeman's Balls charity concerts for Amnesty International, and returned to the stage in 2004 at the National Indoor Arena in Birmingham featuring classic routines from his career. He returned to singing for the musical Go Play Up Your Own End (written by Malcolm Stent, songs by Harvey Andrews) in 2005.

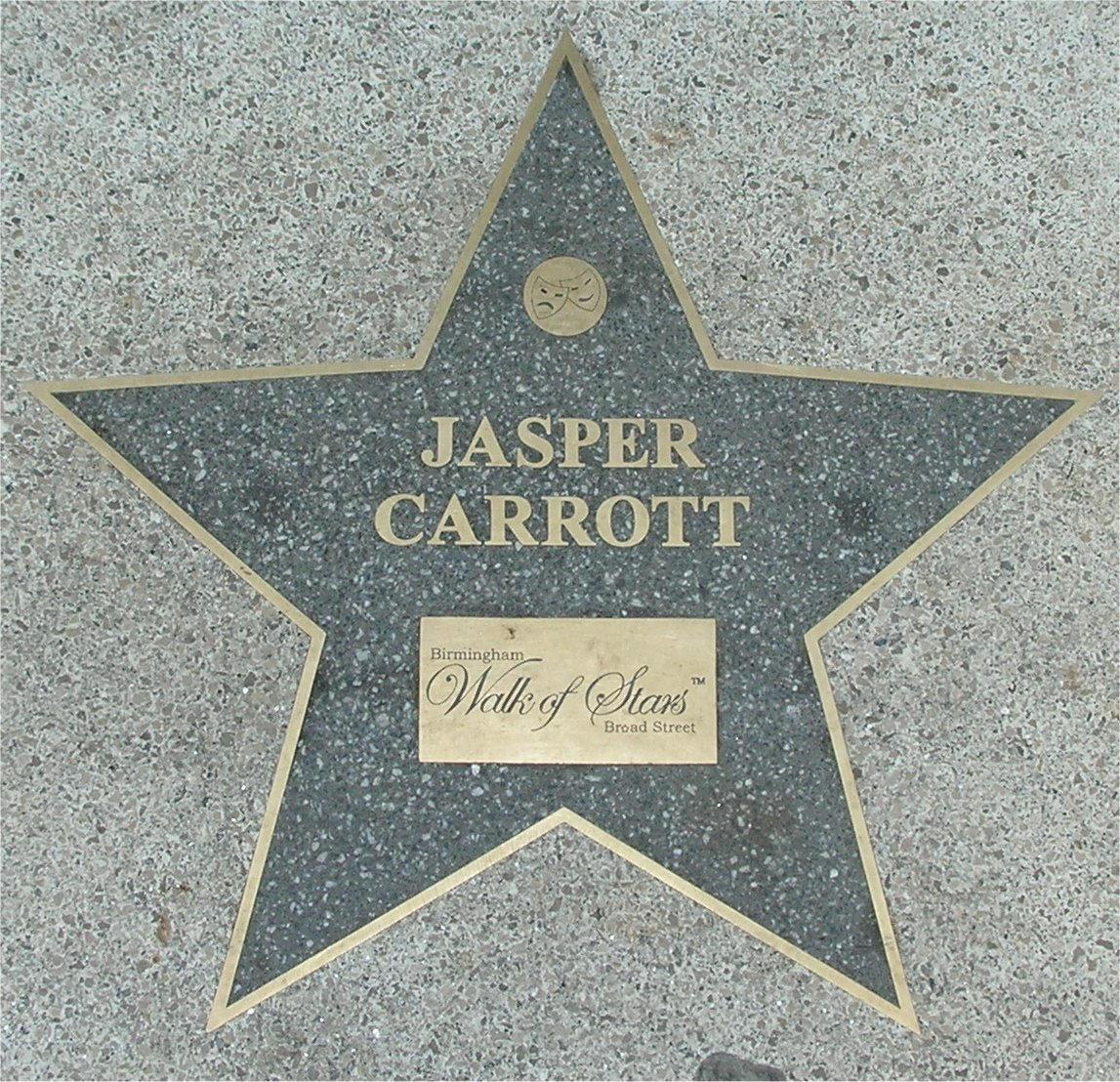
Birmingham Walk of Stars

In 2005, he staged and appeared in the first Jasper Carrott's Rock With Laughter Christmas concert at the National Exhibition Centre (NEC) Birmingham, supported live by Jimmy Carr, Jethro, Roy Wood, and Lenny Henry.

In summer 2007, Carrott hosted the Endemol-produced game show Golden Balls for ITV1.

On 15 September 2007, he was inducted into the Birmingham Walk of Stars at the Arts Fest 2007 celebrations. The award was presented by the Lord Mayor of Birmingham. Carrott is the second inductee, following Ozzy Osbourne. Carrott was awarded the Lifetime Achievement Award by the British Comedy Awards on 6 December 2008.

In August 2017, Carrott underwent an operation to clear a blocked artery, followed by a quadruple heart bypass. A 30-date tour was cancelled. He has since said the surgery gave him a new lease of life and he has no plans to retire, citing Ken Dodd's longevity as an example.

In 2023, Carrott played the character Sykesy in the BBC Radio 4 radio serial drama The Archers.

== Literary work ==
Carrott has written the humorous paperbacks A Little Zit on the Side (1979), and Sweet and Sour Labrador (1982). He also wrote a novel called Shop! or a Store is Born.

Carrott's former manager, John Starkey, has written a book titled Jasper and Me (1993; Etsiketsi Books), which included the line, "He once said, 'Ringo isn't the best drummer in the world. He isn't even the best drummer in the Beatles'." This quote was commonly credited to John Lennon until Mark Lewisohn identified, in 1983, that it was Carrott who said it. However, Lewisohn has since confirmed that the line originally came from a 1981 episode of the BBC Radio 4 comedy series Radio Active, written by Geoffrey Perkins, Angus Deayton and Richard Curtis.

== Business interests ==
Carrott was part-owner of the production company Celador, makers of Who Wants To Be A Millionaire? In 2006, he and wife Hazel sold their shares for £10m when Dutch interactive television company 2waytraffic bought the group of companies behind Millionaire.

== Personal life ==
Carrott married journalist Hazel Jackson in 1972. The actress Lucy Davis is their daughter.

He is a supporter, and was a director, of Birmingham City Football Club; a hospitality suite at their St Andrew's ground is named after him. He was appointed an Officer of the Order of the British Empire (OBE) in the 2003 New Year Honours "for charitable services". The University of Birmingham awarded him an honorary doctorate in 2004, following a similar award from Aston University in 1995.

== Filmography ==
Year	Title	Role	Notes
1978–1981	An Audience with Jasper Carrott / The Unrecorded Jasper Carrott	Himself	Early stand-up specials
1981	Beat the Carrott	Himself	Recorded live at the Theatre Royal, Drury Lane
1982–1983	Carrott's Lib	Himself / Various	15 episodes & 1 Special
1983	Look After My Horse When I'm Gone	Roy Strong & Martha The Horse	Short animated film, LWT
1984	Jasper Carrott – I've Got This Mole	Himself	Short animated film, LWT
1985	American Carrott	Himself	
Unknown	Jasper Carrott – Learner Driver (Mother in Law)	Himself	Short animated film, unknown TX date
1987	Jane and the Lost City	Heinrich / Herman / Hans	
1987	Stand-up America	Himself	
1987–1989	Carrott Confidential	Himself	This includes an election special broadcast on BBC2, and a special trailer for the 2nd series, broadcast on Friday, 15 January 1988, which took the form of a mini sketch with Carrott dressed as Anne Robinson on 'Pointless Views'
1989–1996	Carrott's Commercial Breakdown	Himself	
1990	24 Carrott Gold	Himself	Recorded live at Stratford Upon Avon
1990–1995	Canned Carrott	Himself	
1992	One Jasper Carrott	Himself	Recorded live at the Theatre Royal Drury Lane
1993–1997	The Detectives	Bob Louis	31 episodes, 5 series & 1 Special
1994	Carrott-U-Like	Himself	
1997	The Jasper Carrott Trial	Himself	Based on the original BBC radio series
1999	Jasper Carrott – Back to the Front	Himself	
2002–2004	All About Me	Colin Craddock	
2004	24 Carrott Gold: The Best of Jasper Carrott	Himself	Recorded live at the NEC in Birmingham
2007–2009	Golden Balls	Presenter	289 episodes
2012	The One Jasper Carrott	Himself	9 January 2012
2015	The One Show	Himself / Guest presenter	11 December 2015
2025	Jasper Carrott Remembers	Himself / Guest presenter	19 August 2025

== Discography ==
=== Albums ===
- 1973 – In the Club (Criminal Records)
- 1975 – Rabbitts On and On and On... (DJM Records) UK No. 10
- 1976 – Carrott in Notts (DJM Records) UK No. 56
- 1977 – A Pain in the Arm (DJM Records)
- 1978 – The Best of Jasper Carrott (DJM Records) UK No. 38
- 1979 – The Un-Recorded Jasper Carrott (DJM Records) UK No. 19
- 1980 – Made in Australia (DJM/Festival (Australia))
- 1981 – Beat the Carrott (DJM Records) UK No. 13
- 1982 – Carrott's Lib (DJM Records) UK No. 80
- 1983 – The Stun (Carrott Tells All) (DJM Records) UK No. 57
- 1985 – In America (Rhino Records)
- 1986 – Cosmic Carrott (Portrait Records) UK No. 66
- 1991 – Condensed Classics (Chrysalis/Dover Records)
- 1991 – 24 Carrott Gold (EMI Records)
- 1994 – Canned Carrott for the Record (EMI Records)
- 2000 – Back to the Front volume 1 (Sound Entertainment)
- 2000 – Back to the Front volume 2 (Sound Entertainment
- 2004 – 24 Carrott Gold – The Best of Jasper Carrott (Sound Entertainment)

=== Singles ===
- 1975 – "Funky Moped" / "Magic Roundabout" (DJM Records) UK No. 5
- 1976 – "Bickenhill Rovers Skin'ead Supporters Song" (DJM Records)
- 1977 – "12 Days of Christmas" (DJM Records)
