= Commercial Breakdown =

Light entertainment programme about humorous commercials

- Also known as: After the Break (1996)
- Country of origin: United Kingdom
- Original language: English
- No. of episodes: 59

Production
- Running time: 30–50 minutes
- Production company: Celador Productions

Original release
- Network: BBC1
- Release: 29 December 1989 – 3 August 2008

Commercial Breakdown is a light entertainment show that shows humorous television advertisements from around the world and ran from 29 December 1989 to 3 August 2008 and aired on BBC One. British adverts were initially not allowed because of the BBC's Royal Charter (advertising is completely forbidden on the BBC), but were later permitted provided they were not currently being broadcast. Many of the adverts were international, which means they were not selling items on the British market.

== Transmissions ==
=== Specials ===
Date	Presenter
29 December 1989	Jasper Carrott
27 December 1991	Jasper Carrott
28 December 1993	Jasper Carrott
5 March 1996	Jasper Carrott

=== Series ===
Series	Start date	End date	Episodes	Presenter
1	3 September 1996	5 November 1996	6	Patrick Kielty
2	2 September 1997	18 November 1997	7	Rory McGrath
3	25 November 1999	27 January 2000	8	Jo Brand
4	7 January 2002	25 February 2002	8	Ruby Wax
5	9 January 2004	13 March 2004	10	Jim Davidson
6	6 January 2006	24 February 2006	8	Jon Culshaw
7	15 June 2008	3 August 2008	8	Jimmy Carr
