= Locke (film) =

2013 British–American drama film

- Theatrical release poster
- Directed by: Steven Knight
- Written by: Steven Knight
- Produced by: Paul Webster; Guy Heeley
- Starring: Tom Hardy; Olivia Colman; Ruth Wilson; Andrew Scott; Ben Daniels; Tom Holland; Bill Milner
- Cinematography: Haris Zambarloukos
- Edited by: Justine Wright
- Music by: Dickon Hinchliffe
- Production companies: Shoebox Films; IM Global
- Distributed by: A24 (United States); Lionsgate (United Kingdom)
- Release dates: 2 September 2013 (Venice); 18 April 2014 (United Kingdom); 25 April 2014 (United States)
- Running time: 85 minutes
- Countries: United Kingdom; United States
- Language: English
- Budget: $2 million
- Box office: $5.2 million

Locke is a 2013 psychological drama road film written and directed by Steven Knight. It stars Tom Hardy in the title role (and the only on-screen character) as he drives while conducting a series of phone conversations with characters voiced by Olivia Colman, Ruth Wilson, Andrew Scott, Ben Daniels, Tom Holland and Bill Milner.

The film premiered at the 70th Venice Film Festival on 2 September 2013. The film had a limited release in the United Kingdom beginning on 18 April 2014, and grossed $5.1 million worldwide. It was praised particularly for Hardy's performance, which won him the Los Angeles Film Critics Association Award for Best Actor.

== Plot ==
The evening before he must be present in Birmingham to supervise the largest non-nuclear facility and non-military concrete pour in European history, construction foreman Ivan Locke learns that Bethan (a colleague from a previous job in Croydon, with whom he had cheated on his wife seven months ago, resulting in her pregnancy) has gone into premature labour. Despite his upcoming job responsibilities, and although his wife and sons are awaiting his arrival home to watch a football match, he decides to drive to London to be with Bethan during childbirth. He had himself been abandoned as a child by his father, and he never forgave his father. He is determined not to make the same mistake, even though he has no ongoing relationship with, nor any particular feelings for, Bethan.

Over the course of the two-hour drive from Birmingham to London, Locke holds a total of 36 phone calls with his boss, Gareth; his work trainee, Donal; his wife of 15 years, Katrina, to whom he confesses his infidelity; his sons, Eddie and Sean, who call him separately with updates on the football match he originally planned to watch with them, and later Katrina's breakdown; maternity unit personnel, Sister Margaret and Halil Gullu, who are working with Bethan through troubling complications; the council head, Cassidy, and local police authority, PC Davids, who are required for the road closures needed to allow the 225+ concrete trucks to properly access the site; and Bethan, whom he reassures during labour.

During the calls, Locke is fired from his job by Gareth, banned from his house by Katrina, and asked by Eddie to return home. He coaches Donal through the preparation of the pour despite major setbacks and has imaginary conversations with his dead father, whom he envisions (off-screen) as a passenger in his car. He berates his father for abandoning the family and vows he will not repeat that mistake. When he is close to the hospital, Bethan calls him to share the cries of their baby after her successful childbirth.

== Cast ==
=== Starring ===
- Tom Hardy as Ivan Locke

=== Voices ===
- Olivia Colman as Bethan Maguire, Ivan's colleague whom he cheated with seven months previously, resulting in her becoming pregnant
- Ruth Wilson as Katrina Locke, Ivan's wife
- Andrew Scott as Donal
- Ben Daniels as Gareth
- Tom Holland as Eddie Locke, Ivan and Katrina's younger son
- Bill Milner as Sean Locke, Ivan and Katrina's older son
- Danny Webb as Cassidy
- Alice Lowe as Sister Margaret
- Silas Carson as Halil Gullu
- Lee Ross as PC Davids
- Kirsty Dillon as Gareth's Wife

== Production ==
Almost the entire film takes place within a BMW X5, which was pulled down the M6 motorway on a low flatbed trailer for most of the shoot. Shooting took place over six nights, with the crew only taking breaks to change the three cameras' memory cards. Ivan Locke is the only character to appear onscreen; the others are heard on the vehicle's speakerphone, with their parts also recorded in real time (Locke's vehicle and road noise included) as they called from a conference room that served as the multiple "locations" of the various characters.

== Release ==
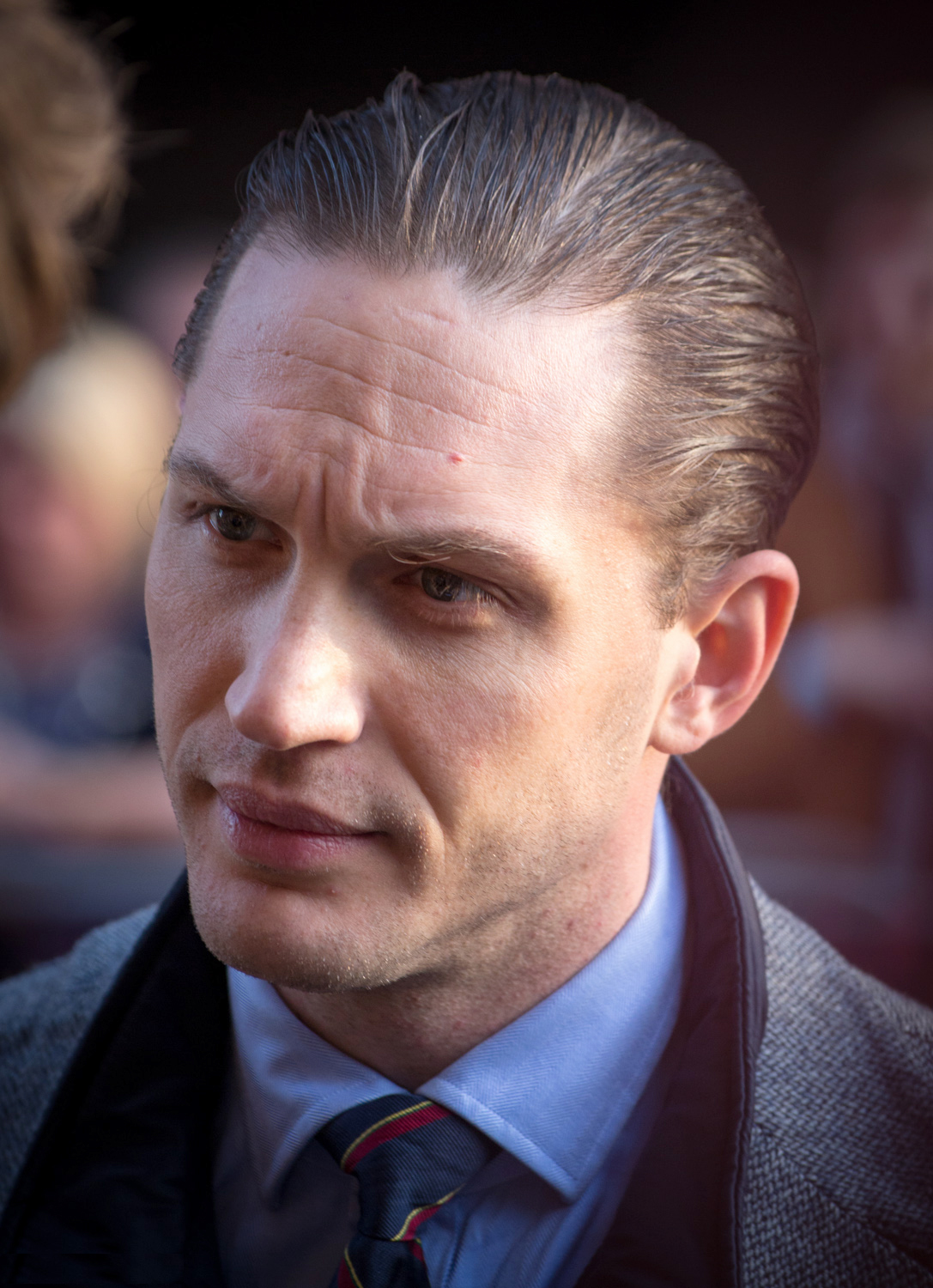
Hardy at the film's premiere, where he garnered critical acclaim for his performance.

Locke was shown out of competition at the 70th Venice International Film Festival as well as the Spotlight program in the 2014 Sundance Film Festival.

It was released on 18 April 2014 in the United Kingdom, where it earned $1,434,082. On 25 April 2014 it opened in the United States and earned $1,375,769. The film was released on Blu-ray and DVD on 12 August 2014.

== Reception ==
=== Critical response ===
On the review aggregator website Rotten Tomatoes, 91% of 216 critics' reviews are positive. The website's consensus reads: "A one-man show set in a confined location, Locke demands a powerful performance—and gets it from a never-more-compelling Tom Hardy." Metacritic, which uses a weighted average, assigned the film a score of 83 out of 100, based on 37 critics, indicating "universal acclaim".

Olly Richards of Empire awarded the film 4/5 stars and said, "There are films to see on huge screens, but this is one that almost cries out for a small cinema, surrounded by total blackness. It's a daring experiment brilliantly executed, with Tom Hardy giving one of the best performances of his career." Film critic David Thomson singled out Locke in his book How to Watch a Movie (2015) and wrote, "No film I've seen in recent years is more eloquent on where we are now, and on how alone we feel. There is little left but to watch and listen."

For his performance, Hardy won the Best Actor Award at the 2014 Los Angeles Film Critics Association Awards.

== Remake ==
A French adaptation titled Le Choix and marketed internationally as Cross Away, directed by Gilles Bourdos and starring Vincent Lindon, was in post-production as of February 2024. It premiered on 20 November 2024.

== Stage adaptation ==
In October 2017, Mirrored Faces Productions staged a theatrical adaptation of the film Locke at BATS Theatre (Propeller Stage) in Wellington, New Zealand. The production was directed and designed by Jett Ranchhod and starred Grant Beban as Ivan Locke. It marked the World Theatrical Premiere of the film's stage version.

=== Production ===
The adaptation faithfully retains the film's real‑time, single‑character framework: Ivan Locke drives on the eve of a major concrete‑pour and manages crises exclusively via speaker‑phone calls to colleagues, family and the expectant mother of his child. On stage, the central set comprises the front section of a car (with real seats) and three pedestals holding symbolic props including a high‑visibility jacket, a hard‑hat, a family portrait and a foetal‑scan image. The performance unfolds in continuous real time over approximately 70 minutes.

Reviewer Ewen Sargent of Stuff wrote: “Solo performances that rely on the audience being totally focused on one character are often exceedingly hard to achieve … yet Locke … does just that in a unique and original way,” and praised Beban's performance as “stellar … very real, believable and engaging.”

The cast of voices interacting with the on‑stage character includes Alida Steemson (Katrina Locke), Charlie Potter (Bethan Maguire), Hugo Randall (Donal), James Bayliss (Gareth), Jett Ranchhod (Eddie Locke), Jonathan Beresford (Sean Locke), Tom Kereama (Cassidy), Lilia Askew (Sister Margaret), Devon Nuku (Dr Halil Gullu), Lyndon Hood (P.C. Davids) and Susannah Donovan (Gareth's wife).

=== Reception ===
The stage adaptation was praised for its effective translation of the film's cinematic constraints into live theatre.

- Theatreview described the production as taking “us on an emotion‑twisting and mind‑bending journey” and commended its capacity to sustain dramatic tension with minimal staging.
- Stuff’s review emphasised the remarkable achievement of remaining “almost motionless on stage the whole time … talking and interacting with voices rather than actual people … Beban successfully achieves this,” and credited the eleven off‑stage voices as “just as real as the character on stage.”, while noting the staging under Ranchhod's vision maintained clarity and emotional immediacy.

== See also ==
- 2013 in film
- Buried, 2010 Spanish film with only one onscreen character who talks to others on his phone.
- Sorry, Wrong Number, 1948 American film where the main character interacts with others on the phone.
- Hallow Road, 2025 British film where two characters interact with others on the phone.
