= Tom Hardy =

English actor (born 1977)

Tom Hardy CBE
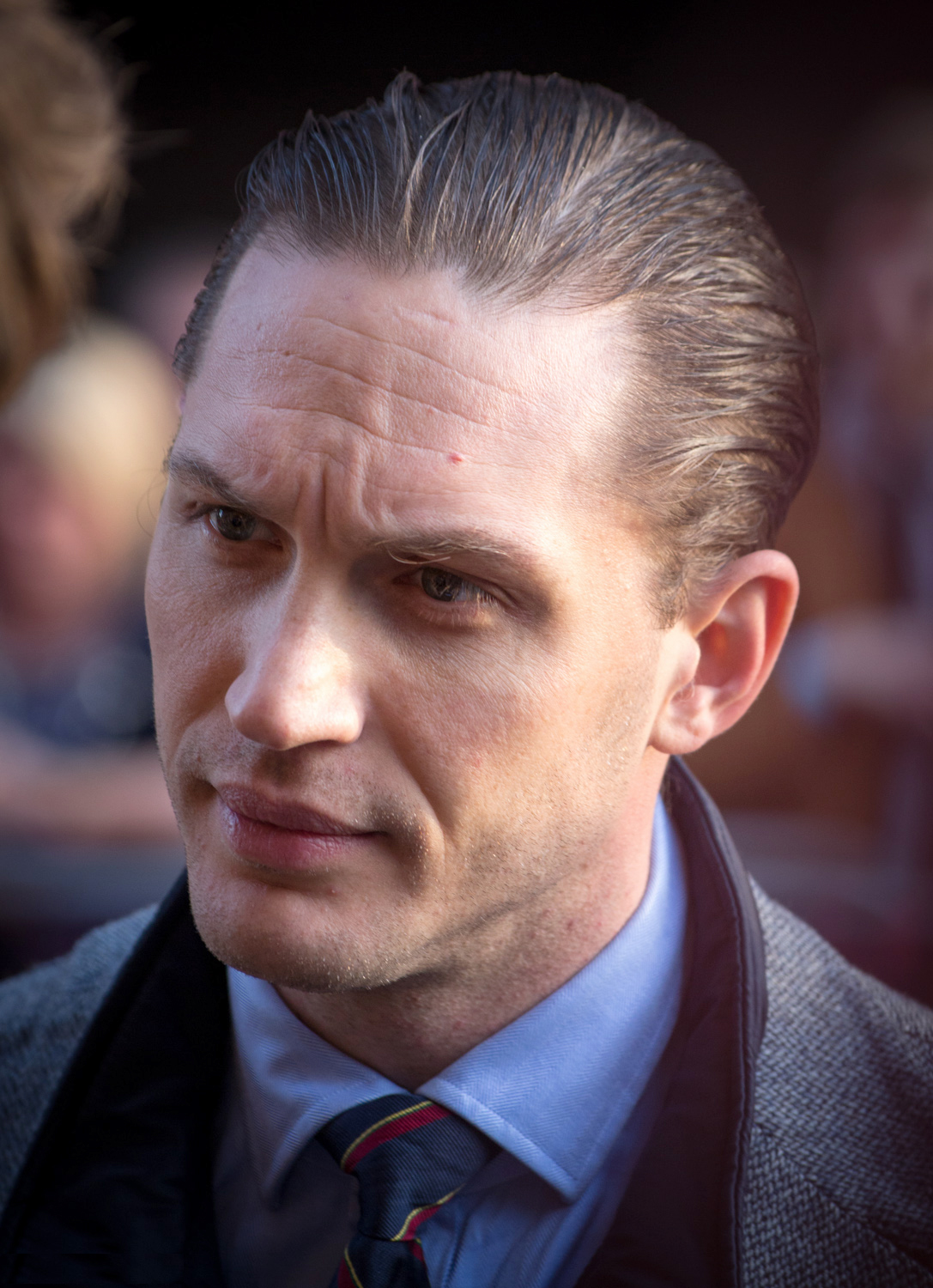
- Hardy in 2014
- Born: Edward Thomas Hardy; 15 September 1977 (age 49); London, England
- Occupations: Actor, Rapper
- Years active: 1998–present
- Spouses: Sarah Ward (m. 1999; div. 2004); Charlotte Riley (m. 2014)
- Partner: Rachael Speed (2005–2009)
- Children: 3
- Father: Chips Hardy
- Awards: Full list

Edward Thomas Hardy (born 15 September 1977) is an English actor and rapper. Known for his intense screen presence and versatility, he has established a career across independent films, blockbusters, and primetime television, often portraying complex and psychologically driven characters. His accolades include a BAFTA Rising Star Award, as well as nominations for an Academy Award, a BAFTA TV Award, a European Film Award, and a Laurence Olivier Award. Films in which he has appeared have grossed over $5.67 billion worldwide.

After training at the Drama Centre London, Hardy made his film debut in Black Hawk Down (2001). He gained early recognition for his roles in Star Trek: Nemesis (2002) and RocknRolla (2008), before achieving critical acclaim for Bronson (2008), Warrior (2011), Tinker Tailor Soldier Spy (2011), Lawless (2012), and Locke (2013). Hardy rose to international prominence in 2015, starring as "Mad" Max Rockatansky in Mad Max: Fury Road and portraying both members of the Kray twins in Legend. That same year, he received a nomination for the Academy Award for Best Supporting Actor for his performance as John S. Fitzgerald in The Revenant. He has frequently collaborated with director Christopher Nolan, appearing in Inception (2010), The Dark Knight Rises (2012), and Dunkirk (2017).

Hardy has also achieved widespread recognition for his portrayal of Eddie Brock and Venom in Sony's Spider-Man Universe films: Venom (2018), Venom: Let There Be Carnage (2021), and Venom: The Last Dance (2024). His television work includes roles in the HBO miniseries Band of Brothers (2001), the BBC dramas The Virgin Queen (2005) and Peaky Blinders (2014–2022), as well as Heathcliff in Wuthering Heights (2009). He also created, co-produced, and starred in the series Taboo (2017). Since March 2025 he has portrayed Harry Da Souza in the Paramount+ series MobLand (2025– ) alongside Pierce Brosnan and Helen Mirren. He is also executive producer of the show.

On stage, Hardy has performed in both the United Kingdom and the United States, earning a nomination for a Laurence Olivier Award for his role in In Arabia We'd All Be Kings (2003). He is also known for his charitable work and serves as an ambassador for the Prince's Trust. In 2018, he was appointed a Commander of the Order of the British Empire (CBE) in the 2018 Birthday Honours for services to drama.

Hardy has also shown interest in the hip-hop and rap scene. In a clip from 2025, Hardy described his wishes to be a "secret member" of the Wu-Tang Clan. He also releases music under the hip-hop alias Frankie Pulitzer, and began making music with hip-hop trio Czarface in 2016, being featured on their album Good Guys, Bad Guys. He released his most recent album, Czarface Meets Frankie Pulitzer with Czarface on August 28, 2026.

== Early life and education ==
Edward Thomas Hardy was born in Hammersmith, London, on 15 September 1977, the only child of Anne (née Barrett), an artist and painter, and the novelist and comedy writer Edward "Chips" Hardy. He is of Irish descent on his mother's side. He was raised in London's East Sheen suburb. Hardy attended Tower House School, Reed's School and Duff Miller Sixth Form College.

Hardy later studied at Richmond Drama School and the Drama Centre London, now a part of Central Saint Martins. Hardy has named the actor Gary Oldman, with whom he would later work on Tinker Tailor Soldier Spy, as his "hero" and added that he mirrored scenes from Oldman while at drama school.

Hardy spent much time in his youth drinking alcohol and using crack cocaine to cope with stresses and has suffered significant bouts of dysthymia. He has previously said that he was "out of control" with his alcohol and drug use before going to rehabilitation in 2003.

== Career ==
=== 1998–2010: Early roles and breakthrough ===
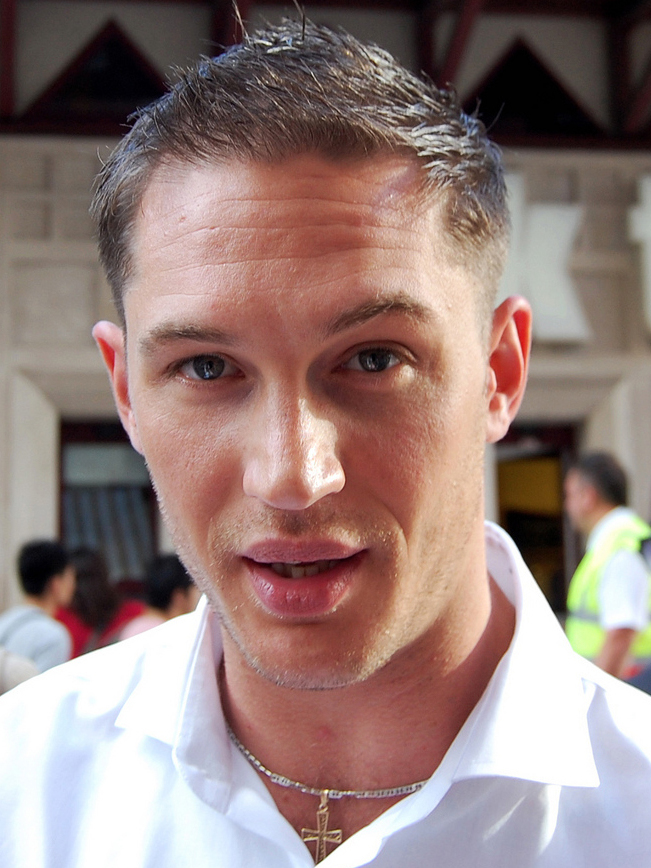
Hardy at the London premiere of Inception in 2010

In 1998, Hardy won The Big Breakfast's Find Me a Supermodel competition at the age of 21 (although the programme said he was 20), earning him a brief contract with Models 1. Hardy joined Drama Centre London in September 1998, and was taken out early after winning the part of the United States Army Private John Janovec in the HBO-BBC mini-series Band of Brothers.

He made his feature film debut in Ridley Scott's war thriller Black Hawk Down (2001). During this time, Hardy also had a brief stint as a rapper and hip-hop producer with his friend Edward Tracy (under the name "Tommy No 1 + Eddie Too Tall"), with whom he recorded a mixtape called Falling On Your Arse in 1999 that remained unreleased until 2018.

In 2002, Hardy appeared as the Reman Praetor Shinzon, a clone of USS Enterprise Captain Jean-Luc Picard in Star Trek: Nemesis. The following year, he appeared in the film Dot the i, and then travelled to North Africa for Simon: An English Legionnaire, a story of the French Foreign Legion. He then returned to the United Kingdom to feature in the horror film LD 50 Lethal Dose (2003).

Hardy was awarded the 2003 London Evening Standard Theatre Award for Outstanding Newcomer for his performances in Blood and In Arabia We'd All Be Kings performed at the Royal Court Theatre and Hampstead Theatre. He was also nominated for a 2004 Laurence Olivier Award for Most Promising Newcomer of 2003 in a Society of London Theatre Affiliate for his performance as Skank in the aforementioned production of In Arabia We'd All Be Kings. Hardy appeared with Emilia Fox in the BBC miniseries The Virgin Queen (2005) as Robert Dudley, a childhood friend of Elizabeth I. Dudley's character has been described as an ambiguous young man who is torn between the affection of his wife (played by Fox), his love for Elizabeth, and his own ambitions. Hardy featured in the BBC Four adaptation of the 1960s science fiction series A for Andromeda.

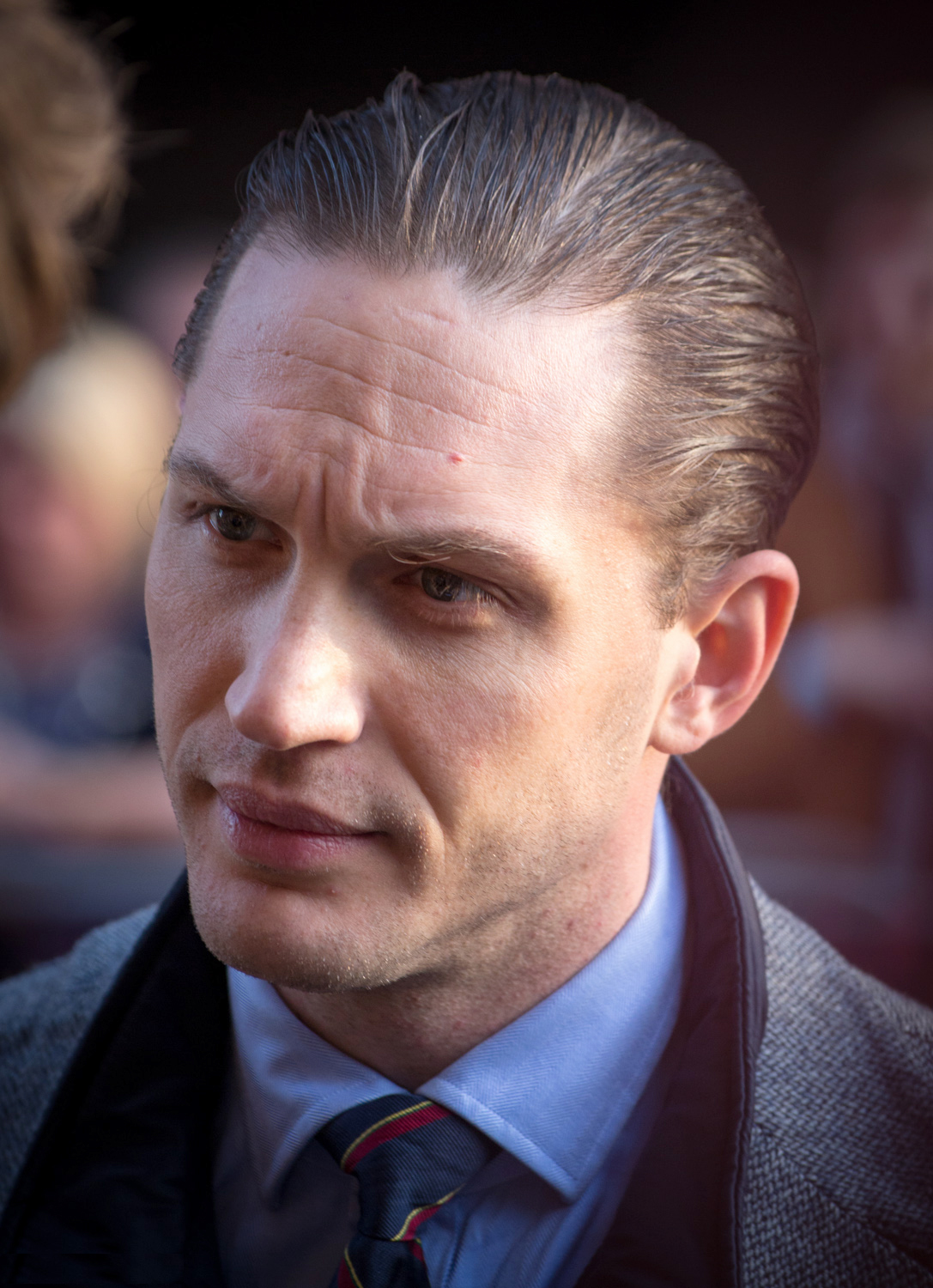
Hardy in 2014

In 2007, he appeared in BBC Two's drama based on a true story Stuart: A Life Backwards. He played the lead role of Stuart Shorter, a homeless man who had been subjected to years of abuse and whose death was possibly a suicide. The same year he played Bill Sikes in the BBC miniseries Oliver Twist, an adaptation of Charles Dickens's novel that aired on PBS Masterpiece Classic in the US. In February 2008 he played a drug-addicted rapist in the British horror-thriller WΔZ. In September 2008 he appeared in Guy Ritchie's London gangster film, RocknRolla; Hardy played the role of the gay gangster Handsome Bob. In 2008 Hardy starred in the film Bronson, about the English prisoner Charles Bronson, who has spent most of his adult life in solitary confinement. For the film, he put on three stone (42 lb or 19 kg).

In June 2009, Hardy starred in Martina Cole's four-part TV drama The Take on Sky One as a drug and alcohol-fuelled gangster. The role gained him a Best Actor nomination at the 2009 Crime Thriller Awards. In August 2009 he appeared in ITV's Wuthering Heights, playing the role of Heathcliff. In early 2010 Hardy starred in The Long Red Road at the Goodman Theatre in Chicago, US. The play was written by Brett C. Leonard and directed by Philip Seymour Hoffman. Hardy won some good reviews for his portrayal of Sam, an alcoholic trying to drink away his past. In 2010 he starred as Eames in Christopher Nolan's science fiction thriller Inception, for which Hardy won a BAFTA Rising Star award. Hardy replaced Michael Fassbender in the 2011 film adaptation of Tinker Tailor Soldier Spy, which premiered at the Venice International Film Festival. In March 2010 Hardy signed a first-look deal at Warner Bros.

=== 2011–2017: Hollywood stardom ===
In 2011, Hardy appeared in the film Warrior, which was released on 9 September 2011 by Lionsgate Films. His performance as Tommy Riordan, who is trained by his father to fight in a mixed martial arts tournament against his brother, gained praise from critics. Hardy also starred in This Means War (2012), a romantic comedy directed by McG. He played the DC Comics supervillain Bane in The Dark Knight Rises, the final film in Nolan's The Dark Knight Trilogy, released on 20 July 2012. He played a bootlegger in John Hillcoat's crime drama Lawless (2012). Hardy signed up to play the lead role of Sam Fisher in Ubisoft's film adaptation of their video game series Tom Clancy's Splinter Cell. He also appeared in Riz Mc's music video for the song "Sour Times".

In 2013, Hardy starred in the drama film Locke. In 2014 he appeared in the crime film The Drop alongside James Gandolfini, in what would be Gandolfini's final appearance in a feature film before his death. Hardy also joined the cast of the BBC crime drama Peaky Blinders in its second series. He portrays Alfie Solomons (who is based on a real-life East End Jewish gangster named Alfred Solomon), the head of a Jewish gang based in Camden Town, and the runner of a distillery which disguises itself as a bakery. Writing for Medium, Shani Silver described Hardy's portrayal of Alfie Solomons as 'The Scene-Stealingest Character Of All Time', commenting that "I’ve never understood if Alfie was meant to be a villain or comedic foil or some pick-a-mix of both, but I’ve never loved every second of someone’s screen time more."

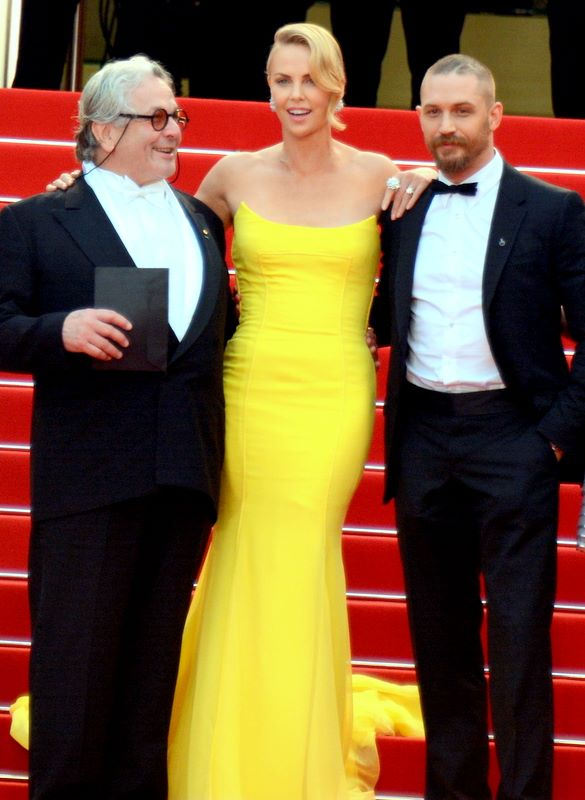
Hardy (right) with George Miller and Charlize Theron at the 2015 Cannes Film Festival

Hardy starred in five films in 2015. The first, Child 44, set in 1950s Soviet Union, saw him playing Leo Demidov, a Soviet secret police agent who investigates a series of child murders. Despite mild praise for his acting, Child 44 was reviewed negatively by critics and was a box office failure. Hardy then played the title character, Max Rockatansky, in the action film Mad Max: Fury Road (2015). His performance was praised by critics and overall the film received critical acclaim and became a box office success, grossing over US$378 million against a $150 million budget, becoming the highest-grossing film in the Mad Max franchise. He played a dual role as London gangsters Reggie and Ronnie Kray in the crime thriller Legend (2015). On 7 December 2015 Hardy won Best Actor at the British Independent Film Awards for his portrayal of the Kray twins, and on the same night attended the premiere of the biographical western thriller The Revenant, in which he reunited with his Inception co-star Leonardo DiCaprio at Leicester Square, London. On 14 January 2016 Hardy received his first Academy Award nomination for Best Supporting Actor for his performance in The Revenant.

Hardy played a Royal Air Force fighter pilot in Nolan's action-thriller Dunkirk (2017), based on the British military evacuation of the French port of Dunkirk in 1940 during the Second World War. He appeared alongside Mark Rylance, Kenneth Branagh, Cillian Murphy and Harry Styles. Hardy also co-produced and starred in the eight-part BBC One television drama series Taboo. It was created by Hardy, Steven Knight, and Hardy's father, Edward "Chips" Hardy. Taboo was aired in the United States by FX.

=== 2018–present: Venom films and beyond ===
In 2018, Hardy starred in the film Venom as the title comic book sometime hero, Eddie Brock, and the symbiote Venom. Based on the Marvel source material, the film was released on 5 October, and is the first installment in Sony's Spider-Man Universe. In 2019 Hardy served as an executive producer in the 2019 BBC/FX three-part miniseries A Christmas Carol. In 2020 Hardy starred in Josh Trank's Al Capone biographical film Capone.

Hardy is attached to star as the British war photographer Don McCullin in a film based on McCullin's autobiography, Unreasonable Behaviour. Hardy reprised the role of Eddie Brock and Venom in the sequel Venom: Let There Be Carnage and co-wrote the story for the film. He is also slated to star as the Antarctic explorer Sir Ernest Shackleton in a biopic being created by the same makers of Taboo. The Shackleton film, which will cover one of the most harrowing stories of survival in exploration history, is also being produced by Hardy's production company Hardy Son & Baker. In May 2024 he and Mahershala Ali were announced to be working on the crime thriller 77 Blackout. The Venom film franchise ended in October 2024 with Venom: The Last Dance. Hardy starred in Guy Ritchie's MobLand which premiered 30 March 2025 on Paramount+. It features Pierce Brosnan and Helen Mirren as heads of the Harrigan crime family. In May 2026, it was reported that Hardy would not be returning for Season 3 of MobLand, Hardy was not asked to return to the series following onset issues with executive producer Jezz Butterworth, 101 Studios, and others. Subsequent reporting clarified that Hardy had not been formally dismissed and that discussions about his return were ongoing. The differences were later resolved, and on 3 September 2026 Paramount+ confirmed both the series' renewal for a third season and Hardy's return as Harry Da Souza. Hardy also starred in the Netflix film Havoc.

In 2021, the hip-hop collective Czarface began collaborating with Hardy under his moniker Frankie Pulitzer. Their debut collaborative album, Czarface Meets Frankie Pulitzer, was released on August 28, 2026; it features collaborations with Busta Rhymes, Method Man and El-P.

== Philanthropy ==
In 2010, Hardy became an ambassador for the Prince's Trust (now the King's Trust), a British youth charity which provides training, personal development, business start-up support, mentoring, and advice. In 2012, he and his then-girlfriend (now-wife) Charlotte Riley became patrons of Bowel Cancer UK. Prior to the inaugural Invictus Games held in London in September 2014, he, along with other entertainers and athletes, read the poem "Invictus" in a promotional video.

== Personal life ==
Hardy married Sarah Ward, a producer, in 1999, and they divorced in 2004. He met and began dating the assistant director Rachael Speed on the set of The Virgin Queen in 2005, and they later had a son before separating in 2009. That year, he began a relationship with the actress Charlotte Riley after they met on the set of Wuthering Heights, and they were married in July 2014. Together they have two sons: the first born in October 2015 and the second born in December 2018. They had one rescue dog, Woodstock, and Hardy appeared with Woodstock in a PETA advertisement to promote pet adoption. Woodstock died on 5 June 2017 due to an aggressive case of polymyositis at 6 years old.

While portraying the prisoner Charles Bronson during the production of Bronson, Hardy met Bronson several times and the two became friends. Bronson was impressed with how Hardy managed to match his muscularity and how well he could mimic Bronson's personality and voice; stating that he believed Hardy was the only person who could play him, he also shaved off his trademark moustache and sent it to Hardy in the hopes that Hardy would wear it in the film. According to George Bamby, Hardy was banned from visiting Bronson in prison following the film's release.

While some outlets describe Hardy as a male feminist, he has stated that he would love to say that, but that it is a hard word for him to "throw around" because he says he has not studied feminism. Hardy added that he considers himself "pro-feminism."

An avid practitioner of Brazilian jiu-jitsu, he has won a number of jiu-jitsu competitions, for example at the UMAC Brazilian Jiu-Jitsu Open Championships in September 2022. He is the lead ambassador for the REORG Brazilian Jiu-Jitsu Foundation, a Royal Marines-backed charity allowing current and former military personnel to learn the martial art as part of their recovery and to combat physical and mental challenges. Hardy was promoted to purple belt in Brazilian jiu-jitsu on 19 June 2023. In 2026, he received his brown belt from Sonny Weston, head instructor at Horsham BJJ, in a promotion tied to a seminar visit from Tom DeBlass.

In October 2023, Hardy signed the Artists4Ceasefire open letter to US President Joe Biden, calling for a permanent ceasefire in the Gaza war, the release of all hostages, and the delivery of life-saving aid to civilians in Gaza.

During a panel at the 2024 New York Comic Con, Hardy revealed he is autistic. In 2026, he collaborated with Tatami Fightwear to develop the AUTsiders line to raise awareness for the neurodiverse community, with the proceeds going to autism charities.

== Filmography ==
Key
†	Denotes productions that have not yet been released

=== Film ===
Film roles of Tom Hardy
Year	Title	Role	Notes	Ref.
2001	Black Hawk Down	SPC Lance Twombly	Credited as Thomas Hardy	
2002	Deserter	Pascal Dupont		
2002	Star Trek: Nemesis	Shinzon		
2003	Dot the i	Tom		
2003	LD 50 Lethal Dose	Matt		
2004	The Reckoning	Straw		
2004	EMR	Henry		
2004	Layer Cake	Clarkie		
2006	Marie Antoinette	Raumont		
2006	Minotaur	Theo		
2006	Scenes of a Sexual Nature	Noel		
2007	Flood	Zack		
2007	WΔZ	Pierre Jackson		
2007	Stuart: A Life Backwards	Stuart Shorter		
2007	The Inheritance	Dad		
2008	Sucker Punch	Rodders		
2008	RocknRolla	Handsome Bob		
2008	Bronson	Charles Bronson / Michael Peterson		
2009	Thick as Thieves	Michaels		
2009	Perfect	Doctor	Short film	
2010	Inception	Eames		
2011	Sergeant Slaughter, My Big Brother	Dan	Short film	
2011	Tinker Tailor Soldier Spy	Ricki Tarr		
2011	Warrior	Tommy Riordan Conlon		
2012	This Means War	Tuck Hansen		
2012	The Dark Knight Rises	Bane		
2012	Lawless	Forrest Bondurant		
2013	Locke	Ivan Locke		
2014	The Drop	Bobby Saginowski		
2015	Child 44	Leo Demidov		
2015	Mad Max: Fury Road	Max Rockatansky		
2015	London Road	Mark		
2015	Legend	Ronald & Reginald Kray	Also executive producer	
2015	The Revenant	John Fitzgerald		
2017	Dunkirk	Farrier		
2017	Star Wars: The Last Jedi	FN-926	Deleted scene	
2018	Venom	Eddie Brock and Venom	Also executive producer	
2020	Capone	Al Capone		
2021	Venom: Let There Be Carnage	Eddie Brock and Venom	Also story co-writer and producer	
2021	Spider-Man: No Way Home	Eddie Brock and Venom	Cameo appearance	
2021	The Matrix Resurrections	Background role	Uncredited extra	
2023	The Bikeriders	Johnny Davis		
2024	Venom: The Last Dance	Eddie Brock and Venom	Also story co-writer and producer	
2025	Havoc	Patrick Walker	Also producer	
2025	Rhino	Narrator	Documentary film	

=== Television ===
Television roles of Tom Hardy
Year	Title	Role	Notes	Ref.
2001	Band of Brothers	John Janovec	Episodes: "Why We Fight" and "Points"	
2005	Colditz	Jack Rose	2 episodes	
2005	The Virgin Queen	Robert Dudley, Earl of Leicester	3 episodes	
2006	Gideon's Daughter	Andrew	Television film	
2006	A for Andromeda	John Fleming	Television film	
2006	Sweeney Todd	Matthew	Television film	
2007	Cape Wrath	Jack Donnelly	5 episodes	
2007	Oliver Twist	Bill Sikes	5 episodes	
2007	Stuart: A Life Backwards	Stuart Shorter	Television film	
2008	Wuthering Heights	Heathcliff	2 episodes	
2009	The Take	Freddie	4 episodes	
2013	Driven to Extremes	Himself	1 episode	
2013	Poaching Wars	Himself	2 episodes; also executive producer	
2014–2022	Peaky Blinders	Alfie Solomons	13 episodes; supporting role	
2017	CBeebies Bedtime Stories	Himself	5 episodes	
2017	Taboo	James Delaney	Also co-creator and executive producer	
2019	A Christmas Carol	—N/a	Executive producer	
2020	All or Nothing: Tottenham Hotspur	Narrator	Documentary	
2022	Falklands War: The Untold Story	Narrator	Documentary	
2022	Predators	Narrator	Nature series	
2023	Great Expectations	—N/a	Executive producer	
2025–present	MobLand	Harry Da Souza	Also executive producer	

=== Theatre ===
Stage roles of Tom Hardy
Year	Title	Role	Notes	Ref.
2003	In Arabia We'd All Be Kings	Skank	Hampstead Theatre, London	
2003	The Modernists	Vincent	Crucible Theatre, Sheffield	
2003	Blood	Luca	Royal Court Theatre, London	
2004	Festen	Michael	Almeida Theatre, London	
2007	The Man of Mode	Dorimant	National Theatre, London	
2010	The Long Red Road	Sammy	Goodman Theatre, Chicago	

== Awards and nominations ==
Hardy received the BAFTA Rising Star Award in 2011 in addition to nominations for an Academy Award, a British Academy Television Award, a European Film Award, and a Laurence Olivier Award. He has received two British Independent Film Awards and a Critics' Choice Movie Award. Hardy appeared on a 2016 Debrett's list of the most influential people in the United Kingdom. He was appointed a Commander of the Order of the British Empire (CBE) in the 2018 Birthday Honours for services to drama.
