= Bridesmaid (disambiguation) =

A bridesmaid is a member of the bride's wedding party.

Bridesmaid may also refer to:

== Film ==
- The Bridesmaid (film), a film based on the Ruth Rendell novel
- Bridesmaids (1989 film), a drama film starring Shelley Hack and Sela Ward
- Bridesmaids (2011 film), a comedy film starring Kristen Wiig and Maya Rudolph

== Other uses ==
- The Bridesmaid (novel), a novel by Ruth Rendell
- Bridesmaid (band), a stoner rock band from Columbus, Ohio
- The Bridesmaid (painting), an 1851 oil painting by John Everett Millais
- The Bridesmaid (Tissot), an 1885 oil painting by James Tissot
