= Laura Smet =

French actress (born 1983)

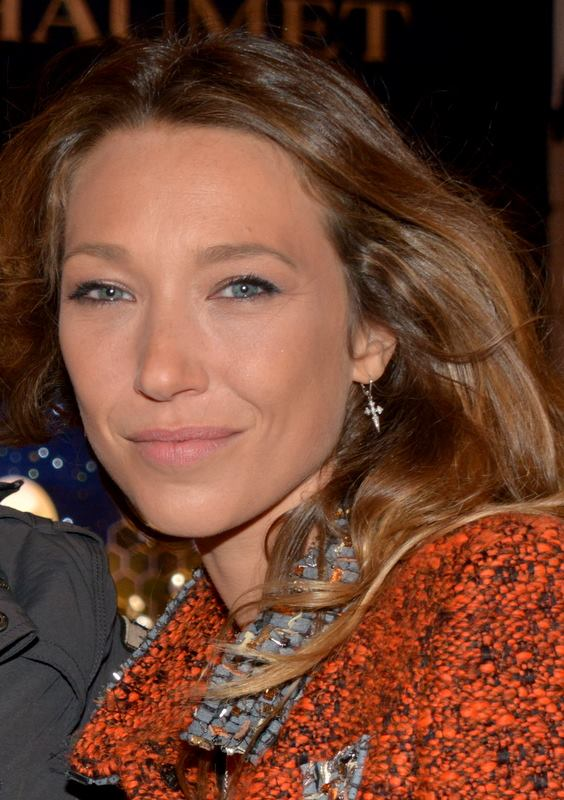
- Smet in 2015
- Born: Laura Huguette Smet; 15 November 1983 (age 42); Neuilly-sur-Seine, France
- Occupation: Actress
- Years active: 2003–present
- Spouse: Raphaël Lancrey-Javal (m. 2018)
- Children: 1
- Parent(s): Johnny Hallyday; Nathalie Baye
- Relatives: David Hallyday (half-brother)

Laura Huguette Smet (French pronunciation: [lɔʁa yɡɛt smɛt]; born 15 November 1983) is a French actress. She is the daughter of rock musician Johnny Hallyday and actress Nathalie Baye. In 1986, her father recorded in her honor the song "Laura", written by Jean-Jacques Goldman.

== Early life ==
She wanted initially to be a theatrical agent like her godfather, Dominique Besnehard. In 1999, she left school and began studying theatre with Raymond Acquaviva.

== Career ==
In 2002, she began her acting career when Xavier Giannoli, on the recommendation of Olivier Assayas, cast her in the role of Charlotte, a young cancer patient in Les corps impatients, and for which she received a nomination for the César Award for Most Promising Actress. In 2003 she starred in Claude Chabrol's film adaptation of the Ruth Rendell novel, The Bridesmaid (La Demoiselle d'Honneur).

In 2004, Smet won the Prix Romy Schneider. In 2006 she played in Le Passager de l'été, a film written and directed by Florence Moncorgé-Gabin, the daughter of Jean Gabin. In 2007 she played Caroline in L'Heure zéro, Pascal Thomas's film adaptation of the Agatha Christie psychological thriller Towards Zero.

== Filmography ==
- 2002: Les Corps impatients (Eager Bodies), directed by Xavier Giannoli
- 2003: La Femme de Gilles, directed by Frédéric Fonteyne
- 2004: La Demoiselle d'honneur, directed by Claude Chabrol
- 2006: Le Passager de l'été, directed by Florence Moncorgé-Gabin
- 2007: UV, directed by Gilles Paquet-Brenner
- 2007: L'Heure zéro, directed by Pascal Thomas
- 2008: La Frontière de l'aube, directed by Philippe Garrel
- 2010: Pauline et François, directed by Renaud Fély
- 2010 : Insoupçonnable, directed by Gabriel Le Bomin
- 2014: Yves Saint Laurent, directed by Jalil Lespert
- 2014: Eden, directed by Mia Hansen-Løve
- 2014: 96 hours, directed by Frédéric Schoendoerffer
- 2014: Tiens-toi droite, directed by Katia Lewkowicz
- 2015: Call My Agent ! (1 episode, in which her mother, Nathalie Baye, also appeared)
- 2017: The Guardians, directed by Xavier Beauvois
- 2017: Carbon
- 2017: Capitaine Marleau
- 2019: The Holy Family
- 2022: Fauda - Season 4
