= Towards Zero (TV series) =

British television series

- Promotional poster
- Genre: Mystery; Drama; Thriller
- Based on: Towards Zero by Agatha Christie
- Written by: Rachel Bennette
- Directed by: Sam Yates
- Starring: Anjelica Huston; Oliver Jackson-Cohen; Ella Lily Hyland; Mimi Keene; Jackie Clune; Grace Doherty; Jack Farthing; Clarke Peters; Matthew Rhys; Anjana Vasan; Alexander Cobb
- Composers: Benji Merrison; Will Slater; Isobel Waller-Bridge
- Country of origin: United Kingdom
- Original language: English
- No. of series: 1
- No. of episodes: 3

Production
- Executive producers: Rachel Bennette; James Prichard; Damien Timmer; Sheena Bucktowonsing; Reemah Sakaan; Stephen Nye; Robert Schildhouse
- Production companies: ITV Studios; Mammoth Screen; Britbox International

Original release
- Network: BBC One
- Release: 2 March – 16 March 2025

Towards Zero is a British mystery television series, adapted by Rachel Bennette from the 1944 novel Towards Zero by Agatha Christie. It features an ensemble cast including Anjelica Huston, Oliver Jackson-Cohen, Ella Lily Hyland, Mimi Keene, Jackie Clune, Grace Doherty, Jack Farthing, Clarke Peters, Anjana Vasan, and Matthew Rhys. It was broadcast on BBC One in three parts from 2 March 2025.

== Premise ==
The three-part serial is a murder mystery surrounding a recently divorced British tennis player holidaying at his aristocratic aunt's house on the south coast of England in the 1930s.

== Cast and characters ==
- Anjelica Huston as Camilla, Lady Tressilian
- Oliver Jackson-Cohen as Nevile Strange
- Ella Lily Hyland as Audrey Strange
- Mimi Keene as Kay Elliott-Strange
- Jackie Clune as Mrs Barrett
- Grace Doherty as Sylvia
- Jack Farthing as Thomas Royde
- Clarke Peters as Mr Treves
- Matthew Rhys as Inspector Leach
- Anjana Vasan as Mary Aldin
- Alexander Cobb as DS Miller
- Khalil Ben Gharbia as Louis Morel
- Adam Hugill as Mac

== Episodes ==
No.	Episode	Directed by	Written by	Original release date	UK viewers (millions)
1	Episode 1	Sam Yates	Rachel Bennette	2 March 2025	4.00
2	Episode 2	Sam Yates	Rachel Bennette	9 March 2025	3.17
3	Episode 3	Sam Yates	Rachel Bennette	16 March 2025	3.19

== Production ==
=== Development ===
The Agatha Christie novel of the same name was adapted by Rachel Bennette who is also an executive producer. Executive producers are James Prichard for Agatha Christie Limited, Damien Timmer and Sheena Bucktowonsing for Mammoth Screen, Danielle Scott-Haughton for the BBC, and Reemah Sakaan, Stephen Nye, and Robert Schildhouse for BritBox International. The series is directed by Sam Yates.

=== Casting ===
In June 2024 Anjelica Huston, Oliver Jackson-Cohen, Ella Lily Hyland, Mimi Keene, Jackie Clune, Grace Doherty, Jack Farthing, Clarke Peters, Matthew Rhys and Anjana Vasan were announced in the cast.

=== Filming ===
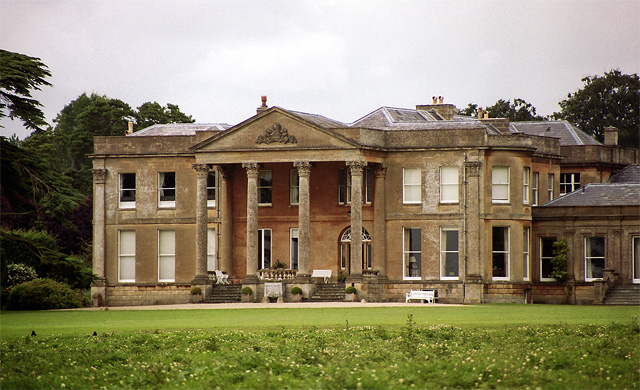
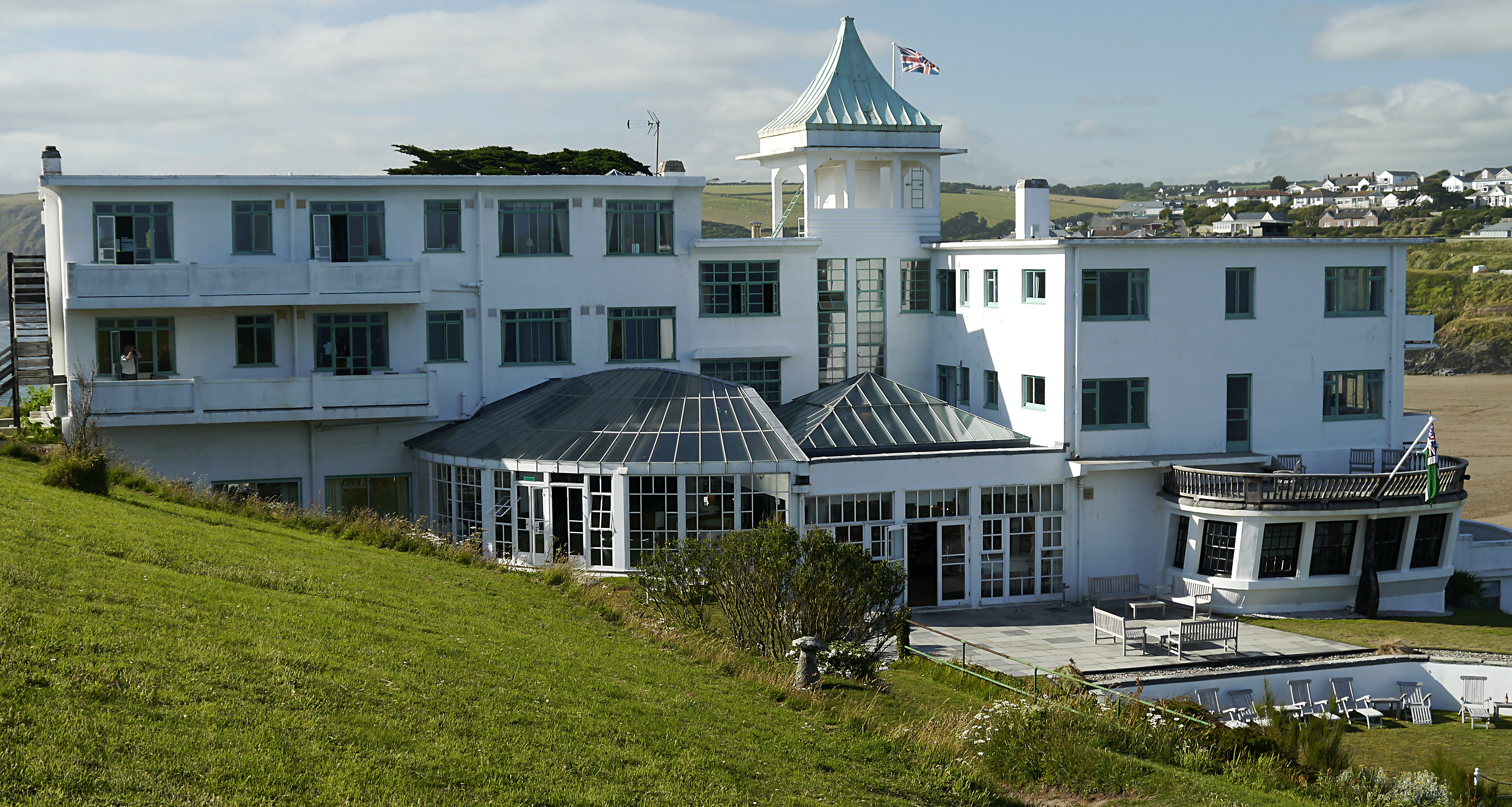
Neston Park in Wiltshire doubled as Gull's Point (top), while Burgh Island Hotel in Devon became the Easterhead Bay Hotel (bottom)

Principal photography began in the summer of 2024 in Bristol and Devon.

== Release ==
The series was broadcast on BBC One in three parts from 2 March 2025. All three episodes were made available on BBC iPlayer on that date.

== Reception ==
On the review aggregator website Rotten Tomatoes, 71% of 24 critics' reviews are positive. Lucy Mangan of The Guardian awarded the series three stars out of five saying that she expected to remain "gently entertained, to the very end. I hope devoted fans enjoy every minute".
