= Bavaria Studios =

Film studios in Munich, Germany

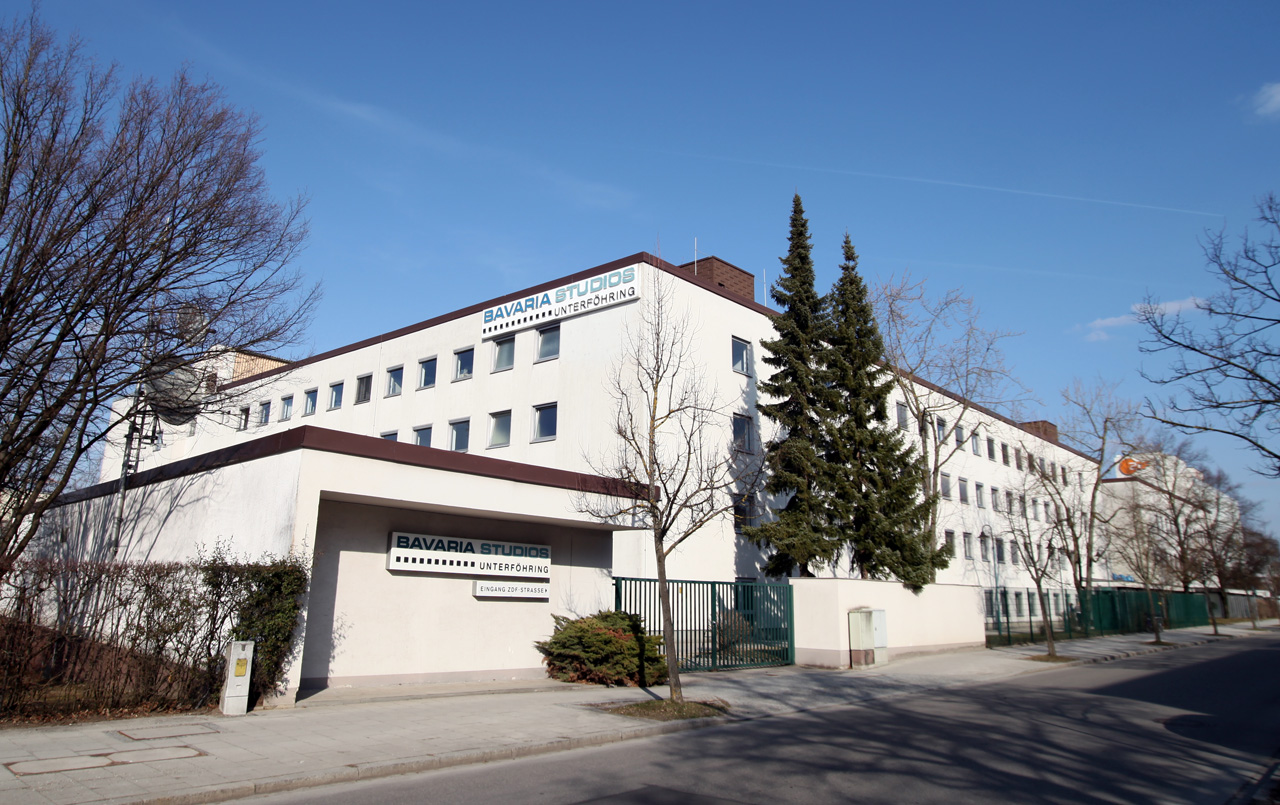
The Bavaria Studios

Bavaria Studios are film production studios located in Munich, the capital of the region of Bavaria in Germany, and a subsidiary of Bavaria Film.

== History ==
The studios were constructed in the suburb of Geiselgasteig in 1919 shortly after the First World War. During their early years, they were known as the Emelka Studios, while Geiselgasteig has also often been used to refer to them. They provided a provincial rival to the emerging dominance of Berlin studios, particularly the UFA conglomerate. Bavaria Film took over the studios, and became the dominant non-Berlin production company.

During the Nazi era, Bavaria was one of the four major companies that dominated the German film industry alongside UFA, Terra and Tobis. In 1942, the companies were merged into a single administrative UFI. When the Cold War began in the 1940s, many of the former Berlin studios were now in East Berlin on the other side of the Iron Curtain and the Bavaria Studios assumed major importance in the West German cinema, gradually recovering from the later war years. Although severe restrictions were placed on the former Nazi-era companies by Allied occupation forces, Bavaria Film was ultimately revived. It has produced numerous films at the studio alongside a variety of independent producers. While other German companies of the same vintage have disappeared, Bavaria Film continues to produce both domestic and international productions including various TV series.

== Notable films ==
In 1925, Alfred Hitchcock made his first two films, The Pleasure Garden and The Mountain Eagle, at Emelka. Both films were co-productions for Britain's Gainsborough Pictures.

In 1934, Peer Gynt was made there. The studios have been used by many notable directors, including Elia Kazan (Man on a Tightrope, 1952), Max Ophüls (Lola Montès, 1955), Stanley Kubrick (Paths of Glory, 1957), Richard Fleischer (The Vikings, 1958), John Huston (Freud: The Secret Passion, 1962), Robert Siodmak (The Nina B. Affair, 1960), Billy Wilder (One, Two, Three, 1961 and Fedora, 1978), John Sturges (The Great Escape, 1963), Robert Wise (The Sound of Music, 1965), Orson Welles (The Deep, 1967), Jerzy Skolimowski (Deep End, 1970 and King, Queen, Knave, 1972), Mel Stuart (Willy Wonka & the Chocolate Factory, 1971), Bob Fosse (Cabaret, 1972), Wim Wenders (Ein Haus für uns (2 TV episodes), 1974), Ingmar Bergman (The Serpent's Egg, 1977), Robert Aldrich (Twilight's Last Gleaming, 1977), Wolfgang Petersen (Enemy Mine, 1985), Claude Chabrol (The Bridesmaid, 2004), and Oliver Stone (The Snowden Files, 2016).

Other German production companies have also produced films in the studios, including Constantin Film with The Neverending Story, Downfall and Perfume: The Story of a Murderer.

== Bibliography ==
- Berghahn, Daniela. Hollywood Behind the Wall: The Cinema of East Germany. Manchester University Press, 2005.
- Perry, George. Hitchcock. Doubleday, 1975.
