= Towards Zero =

1944 mystery novel by Agatha Christie

- Dust-jacket illustration of the US (true first) edition. See Publication history (below) for UK first edition jacket image.
- Author: Agatha Christie
- Language: English
- Series: Superintendent Battle
- Genre: Crime fiction
- Publisher: Dodd, Mead and Company
- Publication date: June 1944
- Publication place: United States
- Media type: Print (hardback & paperback)
- Pages: 242 first edition, hardcover
- ISBN: 9780002318525 1976 UK edition
- Preceded by: The Moving Finger
- Followed by: Absent in the Spring

Towards Zero is a mystery novel by Agatha Christie, first published in the US by Dodd, Mead and Company in June 1944 and in the UK by the Collins Crime Club in July of the same year. The first US edition of the novel retailed at $2.00 and the UK edition at seven shillings and sixpence (7/6).

Lady Tressilian invites her former ward for his annual visit to Gull's Point. He insists on bringing both his former wife and his present wife, though Lady Tressilian finds this awkward. Her old friend Treves dies, then she is murdered as well; Superintendent Battle and his nephew are called in. The book is the last to feature Superintendent Battle.

== Plot summary ==
Lady Tressilian is now confined to her bed but still invites guests to her seaside home at Gull's Point during the summer. Tennis star Nevile Strange, former ward of Lady Tressilian's deceased husband, incurs her displeasure when he proposes to bring both his new wife, Kay, and his former wife, Audrey, to visit at the same time – a change from past years. Lady Tressilian grudgingly agrees to this set of incompatible guests. A long-time family friend, Thomas Royde, home after a long stretch working overseas and still faithfully waiting on the sidelines for Audrey, is also a guest. Staying in hotels nearby are Kay's friend, Ted Latimer, and Mr Treves, an elderly former solicitor and long-time friend of the Tressilians.

The house party feels uncomfortable, as Lady Tressilian had predicted. Invited to a dinner party, Mr Treves relates the story of an old case in which a child killed another with an arrow, which was ruled an accident, although a local man reported seeing the child practising with a bow and arrow. The child was given a new name and a fresh start. Mr Treves remembers the case and the child because of a distinctive physical feature, which he does not reveal. The next morning Treves is found dead in his hotel room and his death is attributed to heart failure from climbing up the stairs to his room the previous night, greatly upsetting Lady Tressilian. Thomas and Ted are mystified, as they saw a note stating that the lift was out of order when they walked Treves back. They learn from hotel staff that the lift was in working order that night. His death is ruled to be from natural causes.

When Lady Tressilian is found brutally murdered in her bed and her maid drugged a few days later, evidence points to Nevile Strange as the murderer since one of his golf clubs is found at the scene with his fingerprints, he and Audrey stand to inherit, and he was overheard quarrelling with Lady Tressilian. However when the maid wakes up she tells Superintendent Battle that she saw Lady Tressilian alive after Nevile's visit to her room, before he left for Easterhead Bay to find Ted. The evidence then points to Audrey: a bloodied glove belonging to her is found in the ivy below her window together with the real murder weapon, fashioned from the handle of a tennis racquet and the metal ball from the fireplace fender in Audrey's room. Mary Aldin, Lady Tressilian's companion, relates the story told by Mr Treves and his claim that he could recognise that child with certainty; Battle is certain that the lift sign was placed in order to silence Mr Treves.

Angus MacWhirter is standing at the cliff where, a year earlier, he had attempted suicide, when Audrey attempts to run off the same cliff. He grabs her before she can jump. She confesses her fear and he promises that she will be safe. The local drycleaners inadvertently give MacWhirter an uncleaned jacket belonging to someone else. Though he is not one of the party at Gull's House, he is aware of the progress of the investigation, well reported in the local newspapers. He realises why the jacket has stains in a certain odd pattern. He visits Gull's Point and requests Mary Aldin's help to find a rope in the house. They find a large damp rope in an otherwise dusty attic and she locks the door until the police come.

Battle arrests Audrey on the evidence and her ready admission of guilt. However he suspects that Audrey is in a similar situation to that of his daughter when she had previously confessed under pressure to a theft she had not committed. MacWhirter meets Battle and tells him what he has learned about this case, including his observation of a man swimming across the creek on the night of the brutal murder and climbing into the house on a rope. Then Thomas reveals that Audrey had ended their marriage, not Nevile, since she had grown afraid of him. She had left Nevile and was about to marry Adrian Royde, Thomas's brother, when Adrian was killed in a road accident. With the parties on a motor launch, Battle uses this information to force a confession from Nevile Strange. He was the mastermind behind all the events and circumstances that should have converged into "zero" – the hanging of his first wife for the murder of Lady Tressilian.

Nevile may have been behind two other deaths (Mr Treves and Adrian Royde) but there is insufficient evidence to prosecute. With his confession, the rope, and the ruse with Mrs Tressilian’s bell-pull explained (it appeared broken but did not contribute to her death), Battle charges him with the murder of Lady Tressilian. Audrey seeks out MacWhirter to thank him and they decide to marry. They will travel to Chile, where he is to begin his new job. Audrey expects that Thomas will come to realize that he really wants to marry Mary Aldin instead.

== Characters ==
- Camilla, Lady Tressilian: chatelaine of her seaside home at Saltcreek, Gull's Point; a widow in her early seventies.
- Mary Aldin: Lady Tressilian's companion, in her mid-thirties.
- Nevile Strange: a handsome athlete and tennis player, 33 years old, former ward of Lady Tressilian's late husband.
- Kay Strange: his beautiful, sometimes mercurial and hot-tempered, second wife, 23 years old.
- Audrey Strange: Strange's first wife, age 32. So cool and quiet, it is almost impossible to know what she is thinking. (The polar opposite of Kay.) She was orphaned young, raised with her cousins and aunt, the Roydes.
- Ted Latimer: a friend of Kay since they were in their mid-teens.
- Thomas Royde: Audrey's cousin, on vacation from his work in Malaya. Like Audrey, he is introverted and a person of few words.
- Mr Treves: solicitor, an old friend of Lady Tressilian, about 80 years old.
- Angus MacWhirter: man who attempted suicide from the cliff near Lady Tressilian's home and survives to become a part of the solution to the crime.
- Inspector James Leach: Battle's nephew, assigned to the Saltcreek area.
- Superintendent Battle: Vacationing with his nephew, he is assigned to the case with him; father of five children, the youngest of whom gives him an insight useful to solving this case.

== Reception ==
Dustjacket illustration of the First Edition published in the U.K.

In a contemporary review in The Times Literary Supplement, Maurice Willson Disher was overwhelmingly positive:

Undiscriminating admirers of Miss Christie must surely miss the thrill of realizing when she is at her best. If this argument is sound then Towards Zero is for the critical. By virtue of masterly story-telling it makes the welfare of certain persons at a seaside town seem of more importance at the moment than anything else in the world. Mechanized brains may object that the murderer "perfects" his mystery by methods imposed upon fiction's police, but even when the maze is vaguely recognised the tale still grips. The characters become so much a part of the reader's existence that he must know what their ultimate fate may be before he will rest satisfied. How alive they are is apparent when two men, both dogged, laconic, poker-faced, never seem alike. The wife and the ex-wife, who neither like nor dislike one another, also reveal creative power. As an exhibition of the modern brand of human nature, Towards Zero deserves higher praises than any that can be awarded to it as an excellent detective story."

In a further contemporary review in The Observer, Maurice Richardson wrote, "The new Agatha Christie has a deliciously prolonged and elaborate build-up, urbane and cosy like a good cigar and red leather slippers. Poirot is absent physically, but his influence guides the sensitive inspector past the wiles of the carefully planted house party, and with its tortuous double bluff this might well have been a Poirot case. How gratifying to see Agatha Christie keeping the flag of the old classic who-dun-it so triumphantly flying!"

Robert Barnard, writing in his Christie-focused, A Talent to Deceive (1990), says regarding Towards Zero: "Superb: intricately plotted and unusual. The murder comes later, and the real climax of the murderer's plot only at the end. The ingenuity excuses a degree of far-fetchedness. Highly effective story of the child and the bow-and-arrow (part II, chapter 6) and good characterization of the playboy-sportsman central character—very much of that era when one was expected to behave like a gentleman at Wimbledon."

== Publication history ==
The novel was first serialised in Collier's Weekly in three instalments from 6 May (Volume 113, Number 19) to 20 May 1944 (Volume 113, Number 21) under the title Come and Be Hanged! with illustrations by Charles La Salle.

It was then published in the United States in June 1944, and then in the U.K. in the following month:

- 1944: Dodd Mead and Company (New York), June 1944, Hardcover, 242 pp
- 1944: Collins Crime Club (London), July 1944, Hardcover, 160 pp

In October and November 1944, the novel was serialised with illustrations under the Come and Be Hanged! title, as a supplement to The Mail (Adelaide), in Australia. Portions are missing from the newspapers scanned by Trove, so the exact dates are not certain, save for the start on 7 October 1944.

These appearances were followed by a long series of further editions:

- 1947: Pocket Books (New York), Paperback, 210 pp (Pocket number 398)
- 1948: Pan Books, Paperback, 195 pp (Pan number 54)
- 1959: Fontana Books (Imprint of HarperCollins), Paperback, 192 pp
- 1972: Ulverscroft Large-print Edition, Hardcover, 347 pp; ISBN 0-85456-126-9
- 1973: Greenway edition of collected works (William Collins), Hardcover, 224 pp
- 1974: Greenway edition of collected works (Dodd Mead), Hardcover, 224 pp; ISBN 0-00-231827-X
- 1977: Penguin Books, Paperback, 192 pp
- 2012: Center Point USA hardcover edition, ISBN 1611734584 / 9781611734584, 292 pp

Numerous editions of audio books have been issued from May 2004 to February 2010.

With regard to digital editions, two Kindle editions were issued in 2010, one from HarperCollins, and one from William Morrow Paperbacks.

== Adaptations ==
=== Stage ===
Christie first wrote a stageplay under this title in 1945, with one week of performances in Martha's Vineyard in the U.S. The script was uncovered in 2015 by Julius Green. The play was also performed in 2019—at The Maddermarket Theatre, Norwich, England—using the 1945 Christie stageplay discovered by Green. As the only prior staging of this version of the play was in Martha's Vineyard in 1945, The Maddermarket proclaimed this the first performance of this stageplay in Europe.

In 1956, Christie adapted the book into a play of the same title with Gerald Verner. It was first published by Samuel French Ltd in 1957. This version of the Towards Zero play was first staged in September 1956 at the St James's Theatre in the West End of London.

A version of Towards Zero was included in the 1978 Christie play collection, The Mousetrap and Other Plays.

=== Film ===
In 1995 a film adaptation in production lost its support from Agatha Christie's estate; when Rosalind Hicks, Christie's daughter and controller of her estate, reviewed the script–which included the mention of incest—Hicks ordered changes to the name of the film, and to the names of the characters. The film was eventually titled Innocent Lies, and met with limited success.

In 2007 French filmmakers adapted the novel to Towards Zero, with the title L'Heure Zéro.

=== Television ===
In 2007 the novel was adapted as part of the third season of the Agatha Christie's Marple television series produced by ITV. Geraldine McEwan plays Miss Marple. The novel did not include Miss Marple; other characters are changed as well for this adaptation to fit the series approach. Superintendent Battle is replaced by Superintendent Mallard played by Alan Davies.

In 2019 the novel was again adapted as an episode of French television series Les Petits Meurtres d'Agatha Christie.

In 2024 the BBC commissioned Mammoth Screen and Agatha Christie Limited to reimagine Towards Zero as a limited series. The series is co-produced by Britbox International. Featuring an ensemble cast including Anjelica Huston, Oliver Jackson-Cohen, Ella Lily Hyland, Mimi Keene, Jackie Clune, Grace Doherty, Jack Farthing, Clarke Peters, Anjana Vasan, and Matthew Rhys, it was broadcast on BBC One in three parts from 2 March 2025.

=== Radio ===
In 2010 Joy Wilkinson adapted Towards Zero as a radio play, first transmitted in January 2010, in four parts, each 30 minutes by BBC Radio 4. The cast includes:

- Nevile – Hugh Bonneville
- Lady Tressilian – Marcia Warren
- Tom MacWhirter – Tom Mannion
- Audrey – Claire Rushbrook
- Mary – Julia Ford
- Kay – Lizzy Watts
- Latimer – Joseph Kloska
- Royde – Stephen Hogan
- Treves, Constable – David Hargreaves
- Umpire/Butler, Inspector Leach – Philip Fox
- Receptionist – Annabelle Dowler
- Porter, Doctor Lazenby – Benjamin Askew
- Sergeant – Matt Addis
