= Ella Lily Hyland =

Irish actress (born 1998)

- Born: 1998 (age 27–28); Carlow, Ireland
- Education: The Lir Academy
- Occupation: Actress
- Years active: 2019–present
- Television: Fifteen-Love; Black Doves
- Height: 1.80 m (5 ft 11 in)

Ella Lily Hyland (born 1998) is an Irish actress.

== Early life ==
From Carlow, Ireland, her grandfather Dinny Hyland was a record-breaking Irish pole vaulter. Her cousin Jamie Hyland is an All-Ireland schools champion in athletics. She trained in pole vaulting and long jump into her teenage years. A member of the County Carlow Youth Theatre Group and the National Youth Theatre, in 2015 she appeared at the Project Arts Centre in Dublin in Salt Mountain by Carmel Winters. She is a graduate of The Lir Academy in Dublin.

== Career ==
Hyland had a lead role alongside Aidan Turner in the 2023 Amazon Prime Video tennis-based drama series Fifteen-Love. Hyland trained for the tennis scenes and was helped on-set by tennis coach and former-pro Naomi Cavaday. Lucy Mangan in The Guardian described her performance as "mesmerising" and "absolutely superlative", displaying "many facets" of her character – "dislikable, vulnerable, grief-stricken, a case of forced maturity and arrested development [all] at the same time". Dónal Lynch in the Irish Independent praised her "tremendous central performance" with "a mixture of vulnerability and knowingness, with a diffident and offhand delivery of her lines often belying the turmoil in her eyes." She can be seen in the 2023 Scottish film Silent Roar.

In 2024, she featured in the Netflix series Black Doves led by Keira Knightley; the Evening Standard described her as "the breakout star" of the series. In September 2024, Hyland made her Abbey Theatre debut playing the titular character in the Lady Gregory play Grania, which ran until the following month.

Hyland has a role in Steven Knight's historical drama series A Thousand Blows (2025). She can also be seen in the BBC's 2025 adaptation of Agatha Christie's Towards Zero, as Audrey Strange, a character Hyland described as "twisted, nihilistic, and hedonistic".

== Filmography ==
=== Film ===
Year	Title	Role	Notes	Ref.
2019	Partner in Crime	Young Alana	Short film	
2021	My Box and Me	Clementine	Short film	
2023	Silent Roar	Sas		
2023	Five and a Half Love Stories in an Apartment in Vilnius, Lithuania	Emma		

=== Television ===
Year	Title	Role	Notes	Ref.
2021	Intruder	Mia	Miniseries; episode 3	
2023	Fifteen-Love	Justine Pearce	Lead role; episodes 1–6	
2023	Storyland	Lisa	Series 11; episode 1: "Wrapped"	
2024–present	Black Doves	Fionnuala Williams	Series 1 and 2	
2025	A Thousand Blows	Marianne Goodson	Episodes 1–6	
2025	Towards Zero	Audrey Strange	Miniseries; episodes 1–3	
2026	Tall Tales & Murder	Bridget	Lead role	
