= Cú Chulainn (disambiguation) =

Cú Chulainn is a legendary hero in the Ulster Cycle of Irish mythology.

Cú Chulainn, Cuchulain, Cuchulainn, etc., may also refer to:

- Cuchulain of Muirthemne, a 1902 book by Augusta, Lady Gregory
- The Cú Chulainn Coaster, a roller coaster at Emerald Park in Ashbourne, Ireland
- "Lancer", the Lancer-class "Servant" of Bazett Fraga McRemitz in the Fate/stay Night series

== See also ==
- Serglige Con Culainn (English: The Sick-Bed of Cú Chulainn), a story from Irish mythology.
