= Peaky Blinders: The Immortal Man =

2026 film by Tom Harper

- Release poster
- Directed by: Tom Harper
- Written by: Steven Knight
- Based on: Peaky Blinders by Steven Knight
- Produced by: Guy Heeley; Cillian Murphy; Steven Knight; Patrick Holland
- Starring: Cillian Murphy; Rebecca Ferguson; Tim Roth; Sophie Rundle; Barry Keoghan; Stephen Graham
- Cinematography: George Steel
- Edited by: Mark Eckersley
- Music by: Antony Genn; Martin Slattery
- Production companies: Garrison Drama; Nebulastar; BBC Film
- Distributed by: Netflix
- Release dates: 2 March 2026 (Symphony Hall); 6 March 2026 (United Kingdom); 20 March 2026 (Netflix)
- Running time: 112 minutes
- Country: United Kingdom
- Language: English

Peaky Blinders: The Immortal Man is a 2026 British crime drama film directed by Tom Harper and written by Steven Knight. It is a continuation of the British television series Peaky Blinders (2013–2022), and stars Cillian Murphy alongside an ensemble cast including Sophie Rundle, Ned Dennehy, Packy Lee, Ian Peck, and Stephen Graham reprising their roles, alongside new additions Rebecca Ferguson, Tim Roth, Jay Lycurgo, and Barry Keoghan.

The film premiered at Symphony Hall, Birmingham on 2 March 2026, released in select cinemas on 6 March 2026, and released globally on Netflix on 20 March 2026.

== Plot ==
In November 1940, former Member of Parliament Tommy Shelby is writing an autobiography after retreating from public life following the death of his elder brother Arthur. Ada Shelby, who has succeeded Tommy as the MP for Birmingham South, keeps him informed about his son Duke, the leader of the Peaky Blinders crime gang. The Birmingham Blitz is in full swing, and a Luftwaffe night raid on Birmingham destroys a BSA munitions factory. The gang steals munitions from the destroyed factory, unaware Duke has privately joined forces with Nazi agent John Beckett, who intends to have the Peaky Blinders distribute £70 million of counterfeit currency through the gang's networks so Nazi Germany can subdue the United Kingdom's economy by hyperinflation.

Kaulo Chiriklo, the twin sister of Duke's mother Zelda Chiriklo, calls Tommy the Rom Baro (Gypsy King), claims to have spoken to Arthur beyond the grave, and goads Tommy into divulging he'd accidentally killed Arthur, who had acted erratically under the influence of opium. She interprets Tommy's act as a kindness, and convinces him to return to Birmingham to help Duke. Beckett discovers Ada has evidence of Duke's involvement in the factory raid and intends to share it with authorities and derail the plot. When Duke proves unable to follow Beckett's orders to kill Ada, Beckett kills her himself.

Tommy confronts Duke about his ill-disciplined ways, learns of the plot, and plans to ambush Beckett at the mortuary where Ada's body lies before he can be ambushed himself. Tommy confesses to his deceased sister he had killed Arthur after becoming exasperated by his volatility. Beckett appears and they exchange gunfire. Kaulo privately visits Duke and instructs him to ally with his father and kill Tommy with a bullet she has engraved his name on.

Tommy, once again leader of the Peaky Blinders, plans to ambush Beckett at the arrival of the counterfeit money, aided by old allies Charlie Strong, Curly and dockyard boss Hayden Stagg. Duke reconnects with Beckett and promises to ensure the safe passage of the counterfeit money. Tommy plans to have the Blinders travel by narrowboat to Liverpool to confront Beckett's Nazi mercenaries, while he travels through a disused tunnel to surprise Beckett personally.

Tommy reveals he's aware of Kaulo's intentions but doesn't explicitly oppose them. Beckett, warned by Duke of the plan, has his forces intercept the narrowboats not knowing they're rigged with explosives. The detonation kills many mercenaries. Duke reveals to Beckett he had chosen to support his father all along, then escapes. The Blinders arrive and kill Beckett's surviving mercenaries. Tommy incinerates the counterfeit money with a landmine. Beckett tries to escape and wounds Tommy in a shootout before being killed. Tommy is prevented from suicidally standing in front of Beckett's speeding car by Duke. Tommy begs Duke to kill him with the engraved bullet Kaulo gave him. Duke relents and Tommy dies reciting the first line of the poem "In the Bleak Midwinter", having finally attained peace.

Duke is the new Rom Baro, and the Peaky Blinders conduct a Gypsy funeral for his predecessor. Kaulo recovers Tommy's manuscript, The Immortal Man, in which Tommy reminisces that despite his wealth and power, he had his family by his side, and is now in death reunited with them.

== Cast ==
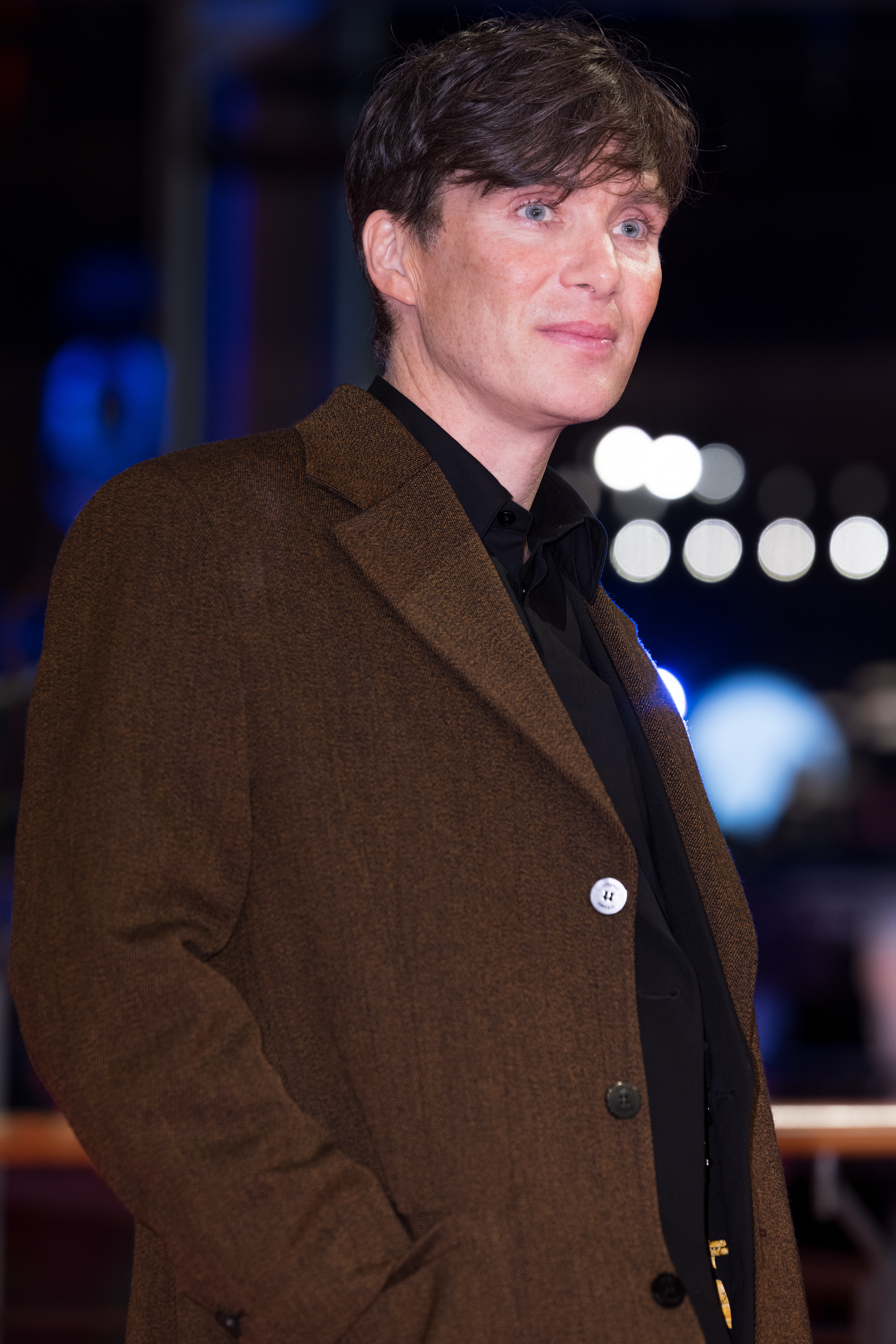
- Cillian Murphy stars as Tommy Shelby
  Cillian Murphy as Thomas Shelby, the former leader of the Peaky Blinders.
- Barry Keoghan as Erasmus "Duke" Shelby, Tommy's eldest son and the current leader of the Peaky Blinders
- Rebecca Ferguson as Kaulo and Zelda Chiriklo,
  - Kaulo, a palm reader and the twin sister of Zelda
  - Zelda, Tommy's former flame and Duke's late mother
- Tim Roth as John Beckett, a Nazi agent who seeks to defeat the United Kingdom using economic subterfuge.
- Stephen Graham as Hayden Stagg, a dockworker referred to as the 'Liverpool King'
- Sophie Rundle as Ada Thorne, née Shelby, Tommy's sister and the MP for Birmingham South.
- Ned Dennehy as Charlie Strong, one of Tommy's old allies who owns a scrapyard.
- Packy Lee as Johnny Dogs, Tommy's friend and the only one with him during his self-imposed isolation.
- Ian Peck as Curly, one of Tommy's old allies who works in Charlie's scrapyard.
- Jay Lycurgo as Elijah, Duke's right-hand man.
- David Cushman as Butch

== Production ==
The British television series Peaky Blinders ran for six series between 2013 and 2022. Speaking in January 2021, show creator Steven Knight discussed the future of the Peaky Blinders storytelling ahead of the conclusion of the sixth series and suggested a feature-length film could be produced as a continuation of the story.

Speaking to Rolling Stone magazine in May 2023, actor Cillian Murphy, who played lead character Tommy Shelby in all six series, indicated a willingness to return to the character, saying "If there's more story there, I'd love to do it. But it has to be right. Steve Knight wrote 36 hours of television, and we left on such a high. I'm really proud of that last series. So, it would have to feel legitimate and justified to do more". In December 2023, Knight confirmed that he was finalising the script for the film.

In March 2024, Knight confirmed that Murphy would be returning for the film to reprise his role as Shelby. Principal photography was expected to commence in September 2024, in Digbeth at Knight's Digbeth Loc Studios. Producers on the film are Knight, Caryn Mandabach, Murphy, and Guy Heeley. In July 2024, Rebecca Ferguson joined the cast. In August, Barry Keoghan joined the cast, with Netflix handling the distribution. Murphy, who has previously worked with Keoghan on Dunkirk, was instrumental in casting Keoghan - ultimately text messaging him an offer to play a part. In September, Tim Roth and Jay Lycurgo joined the cast. By October, Stephen Graham, Sophie Rundle, Ned Dennehy, Packy Lee, and Ian Peck were reported to be reprising their roles from the series.

Reports in September 2024 suggested that filming would take place in October 2024 in St Helens, Merseyside with the title set to be The Immortal Man.

Principal photography began on 30 September 2024 at Digbeth Loc Studios in Birmingham, and in the West Midlands. The filming in St Helens took place at the former Pilkington Watson Street works. Filming wrapped on 13 December. A climatic fight scene between Murphy and Keoghan was shot on location in mud contaminated with pig feces; it was shot with Keoghan holding his own more in the fight and gaining the upper-hand at one moment but that was removed in the edit.

== Music ==
The original score for the film was composed by Antony Genn and Martin Slattery, including tracks featuring Grian Chatten, Carlos O'Connell, Tom Coll and Amy Taylor. In addition, Genn and Slattery curated a list of songs performed by other artists, such as Nick Cave, Fontaines D.C., Mclusky, Lankum, Grian Chatten and Girl In The Year Above. The soundtrack was released on 6 March 2026 and included 36 tracks.

== Release ==
Peaky Blinders: The Immortal Man premiered at Symphony Hall, Birmingham on 2 March 2026 and released in select cinemas on 6 March 2026, and released globally on Netflix on 20 March 2026. The film became the most-watched title on the streamer during the week of March 16-22, reaching 25.3 million views in its first 3 days of release on Netflix.

== Reception ==
=== Critical response ===
On the review aggregator website Rotten Tomatoes, 90% of 100 critics' reviews are positive, with an average rating of 7.00/10. The website's consensus reads: "Capping off Tommy Shelby's story with grit and swagger, The Immortal Man is a satisfying conclusion to Peaky Blinders that also stands tall on its own self-contained terms." Metacritic, which uses a weighted average, assigned the film a score of 59 out of 100, based on 27 critics, indicating "mixed or average" reviews.

Writing for The Guardian, Peter Bradshaw gave Peaky Blinders: The Immortal Man 3 out of 5 stars, describing it as a muscular feature adaptation marked by mud, violence, and wartime tension. He praised Cillian Murphy’s return as Tommy Shelby and the film’s dramatic style, while noting that its sentimental treatment of the character may appeal more strongly to viewers already familiar with the television series Peaky Blinders. In a review for Empire, Dan Jolin also awarded the film 3 out of 5 stars, describing it as a continuation of the television series that retains its established visual style and familiar setting. He praised Murphy’s screen presence as Tommy Shelby, while noting that the film functions more as an extended episode of Peaky Blinders than as a fully distinct cinematic work. Reviewing for The Hollywood Reporter, Robyn Bahr described the film as a visually polished but unambitious continuation of the series, praising the performances of Murphy and Barry Keoghan while noting that the film moves quickly through familiar material toward a predictable conclusion. James Mottram in NME also gave the film 3 out of 5 stars, describing it as an action-focused and cinematic sequel that benefits from strong performances, while noting that it carries the tone of a final television episode more than a fully emotional conclusion. For The Independent, Clarisse Loughrey gave the film 3 out of 5 stars, describing it as a stylish but formulaic continuation, praising the performances of Cillian Murphy and Barry Keoghan while noting that the film adds little narrative development beyond the television series.

In Deadline Hollywood, Damon Wise described the film as an entertaining and visually assured continuation that works on its own terms, praising Cillian Murphy's emotionally nuanced performance as Tommy Shelby. In a review for The New York Times, Jeannette Catsoulis described the film as an atmospheric but uneven continuation, praising its visual design while noting that its familiar narrative and character treatment reduce its emotional weight.

=== Accolades ===
Award	Date of ceremony	Category	Recipient	Result	Ref.
National Film Awards UK	July 1, 2026	Best Drama	Peaky Blinders: The Immortal Man	Nominated	
National Film Awards UK	July 1, 2026	Best Feature Film	Peaky Blinders: The Immortal Man	Nominated	
National Film Awards UK	July 1, 2026	Best Supporting Actress	Sophie Rundle	Nominated	
National Film Awards UK	July 1, 2026	Best Supporting Actor	Stephen Graham	Nominated	
National Film Awards UK	July 1, 2026	Best Supporting Actor	Tim Roth	Nominated	
National Film Awards UK	July 1, 2026	Best Director	Tom Harper	Won	
National Film Awards UK	July 1, 2026	Best Producer	Guy Heeley & Cillian Murphy	Nominated	
National Film Awards UK	July 1, 2026	Best Streaming Platform	Netflix	Nominated	
National Film Awards UK	July 1, 2026	Best British Film	Peaky Blinders: The Immortal Man	Nominated	
National Film Awards UK	July 1, 2026	Best Film Production Company	BBC Film	Won	
