= Spreading the News =

Spreading the News is a short one-act comic play by Lady Gregory, which she wrote for the opening night of the Abbey Theatre in Dublin, 27 Dec. 1904. It was performed as part of a triple bill alongside William Butler Yeats's On Baile's Strand and a revival of the Yeats and Gregory collaborative one-act Cathleen Ni Houlihan (1902). Audiences may have dozed through Yeats's play, but Spreading the News was very successful and it is still acted at the Abbey Theatre as late as 1961. Lady Gregory remarked after seeing an early performance of the play that "the audience would laugh so much at 'Spreading the News' that they lost about half the dialogue. I mustn't be so amusing again!"

== Plot summary ==
In a small village in rural Ireland, a new (English) magistrate inspects stalls at the local fair, expecting the worst. Because of Mrs. Tarpey's hearing impairment and the villagers' love of gossip, a misunderstanding grows and grows, leading to a false arrest for a murder that never happened. The play ends abruptly, with little resolution; we are left wondering what happened. Most of the humour is situational, rather than playing with language. Because we know what really happened at the beginning, most of the play uses dramatic irony.

== Main characters ==
The majority of the characters are flat and undefined. Many of them are stock characters, whose behavior is stereotypical and whose presence merely advances the plot.

- Bartley Fallon: a habitual pessimist, convinced that bad things will always happen to him.
- Mrs. Fallon: a bit belligerent, but supportive of her husband until there is a suggestion that he has been unfaithful.
- Jack Smith: the supposed victim, owns a hayfork.
- the Magistrate: an over-zealous bumbling idiot, given to wild suppositions and also stating the obvious.

== Themes ==
Gossip: Gregory satirizes the way that people are happy to believe the worst about their neighbors, and tend not to think before they talk. She points out the ways in which gossip is distortive and leads to misunderstanding and even violence.

America: the characters in the play assume that America is a place where people go to escape prosecution, itself a dangerous place: Bartley says "I'm thinking if I went to America it's long ago the day I'd be dead."

== Socio-political context ==
Spreading the News is a comedy that exploits both English and Irish stereotypes. Lady Gregory was a member of the Protestant upper classes of Ireland, but she had sympathies for Irish Nationalism and was a strong supporter of Irish culture and identity. In this play she carefully reproduces the colloquial style and lower-class dialect of the workers on her estate in an effort to represent their culture accurately, and yet at the same time she reproduces various stereotypes about Irish people. She also includes satire versus the English governing class (of which she was a member) in the character of the Magistrate. The Magistrate comes to the village expecting people to be committing crimes: in a way, he is imposing his idea of their corruption on them, and they accept it/live up to it. However, there are no real "sides" in the play. Spreading the News may have been written to help the Irish and the English understand each other by having them see each other's flaws.
