= Grania (play) =

Play by Lady Gregory (1912)

- Cover of Irish Folk-History Plays (1912), which contained Grania, Kincora and Dervorgilla
- Written by: Lady Gregory
- Characters: Grania; Finn; Diarmuid; Two young men
- Subject: Diarmuid and Gráinne
- Genre: Romance, tragedy
- Setting: Almhuin, Ancient Ireland

Premiere
- Date premiered: 1912
- Place premiered: Dublin

Grania is a play written by Lady Gregory in 1912.

It was revived at the Abbey Theatre in 2024, starring Lorcan Cranitch, Ella Lily Hyland and Niall Wright, directed by Caitríona McLaughlin.
