= Towards Zero (film) =

2007 French mystery film

- Film poster
- Directed by: Pascal Thomas
- Screenplay by: Clémence de Biéville; François Caviglioli; Roland Duval; Nathalie Lafaurie
- Based on: Towards Zero by Agatha Christie
- Produced by: Hubert Watrinet
- Starring: François Morel; Danielle Darrieux
- Cinematography: Renan Pollès
- Edited by: Catherine Dubeau; Elena Mano
- Music by: Reinhardt Wagner
- Distributed by: StudioCanal
- Release date: 2007
- Running time: 107 minutes
- Country: France
- Budget: $8.5 million
- Box office: $4.2 million

Towards Zero (French: L'Heure zéro) is a 2007 French mystery film directed by Pascal Thomas and starring François Morel, Danielle Darrieux and Melvil Poupaud. It is an adaptation of the 1944 novel Towards Zero by Agatha Christie.

== Cast ==
- François Morel - Superintendent Battle|Inspector Martin Bataille
- Danielle Darrieux - Camilla Tressilian
- Melvil Poupaud - Guillaume Neuville
- Laura Smet - Caroline Neuville
- Chiara Mastroianni - Aude Neuville
- Alessandra Martines - Marie-Adeline
- Clément Thomas - Thomas Rondeau
- Xavier Thiam - Frédéric Latimer
- Hervé Pierre - Ange Werther
- Vania Plemiannikov - Pierre Leca
- Jacques Sereys - Charles Trevoz
- Valériane de Villeneuve - Emma
- Paul Minthe - Heurtebise
- Carmen Durand - Barrette
- Dominique Reymond - Madame Geoffroy
