= Tall Tales & Murder =

Irish television series

- Created by: Stuart Carolan; Chris Addison
- Based on: Dublin Trilogy by Caimh McDonnell
- Written by: Stuart Carolan
- Screenplay by: Stuart Carolan
- Directed by: Chris Addison; Neasa Hardiman
- Starring: Ella Lily Hyland; Aidan Gillen; Philippa Dunne; Packy Lee; Aisling O'Sullivan; Casey Walsh
- Countries of origin: Ireland; United Kingdom
- Original language: English
- No. of series: 2

Production
- Executive producers: Stuart Carolan; Chris Addison; Catherine Tiernan; David McLoughlin; Richard Allen-Turner; Rob Aslett; Jon Thoday
- Producers: Caroline Norris; Gemma O’Shaughnessy
- Production companies: Avalon Entertainment; Metropolitan Pictures

Original release
- Network: RTÉ; BBC One

Tall Tales & Murder is an Irish comedic crime drama television series. It is adapted from the novels by Caimh McDonnell. It has an ensemble cast featuring Ella Lily Hyland, Aidan Gillen, Philippa Dunne, Casey Walsh and Packy Lee. The series premiered on RTÉ on 27 September 2026 and on BBC One on 3 November 2026.

== Premise ==
An anonymous patient awakes from a long coma in a nursing home in Dublin, and claims to be a gangster who knows the location of buried treasure.

== Cast ==
- Casey Walsh as Paul
- Ella Lily Hyland as Bridget
- Aidan Gillen as "Grinner" McNair
- Philippa Dunne as Ma Baker
- Packy Lee as Wesley Swanson
- Aisling O'Sullivan as Monica ("Matron")
  - Maria Cunningham as Young Matron
- Brian Doherty as Det. Bunny Ryan
  - Tiernan Messitt-Greene as Young Bunny
- Ned Dennehy as the Abbot
- Barry Murphy as Maurice
- Ebby O'Toole-Acheampong as Britney
- Olwen Fouéré as Lady Fitzgibbon
- Ian Fitzgibbon as Lord Fitzgibbon

== Production ==
The project was commissioned by RTÉ and the BBC for two series and is produced by Avalon in association with Metropolitan Pictures. It was co-created by Stuart Carolan and Chris Addison and adapted from the novels by Caimh McDonnell. Addison is director of episodes alongside Neasa Hardiman, from a script by Carolan. Addison, Carolan, Richard Allen-Turner, Rob Aslett, and Jon Thoday are executive producers for Avalon, with David McLoughlin, and Catherine Tiernan for Metropolitan Pictures. Caroline Norris is series producer and Gemma O’Shaughnessy is also a producer. The books had been optioned initially in 2021. The series evolved from the books, with Addison saying in 2026 that "any adaptation is going to be different from the source material, it’s just the degree to which it’s different. We left the source material so far behind in the first season that coming into Season two…it’s a whole other world at that point".

The cast is led by Ella Lily Hyland, Aidan Gillen, Philippa Dunne, Casey Walsh and Packy Lee. The cast also includes Aisling O'Sullivan, Tiernan Messitt-Greene and Brian Doherty.

Filming began in Ireland in June 2025. First-look images from filming were released in August 2026.

== Broadcast ==
The series premiered on RTÉ on 27 September 2026 and on BBC One on 3 November 2026.

== Reception ==
Ann Marie Hourihane in the Irish Independent praised the performance in the show's premiere of Hyland and Walsh as well as the design for the show and the pacing, saying it was "hard to think of a better first episode of any Irish drama series".
