= Next Life (film) =

American-British-Cypriot science fiction romantic drama film

- Directed by: Drake Doremus
- Written by: Drake Doremus
- Produced by: Drake Doremus; John Palfery Smith; Elika Portnoy; Gleb Fetisov; Ben Pugh; Kate Buckley; Emilia Clarke
- Starring: Emilia Clarke; Édgar Ramírez; Jack Farthing
- Cinematography: Marianne Bakke
- Edited by: Avner Shiloah
- Music by: Dan Romer
- Production companies: 42; Mutressa Movies; Magical Thinking Pictures; Fetisoff Illusion
- Distributed by: Vertigo Releasing (United Kingdom)
- Release dates: June 5, 2026 (Tribeca Festival); 2026 (United Kingdom)
- Running time: 112 minutes
- Countries: United States; United Kingdom; Cyprus
- Language: English

Next Life is a 2026 science fiction romantic drama film written and directed by Drake Doremus and starring Emilia Clarke, Édgar Ramírez, and Jack Farthing.

== Premise ==
It is described as a love story on multiple timelines as Ivy navigates parallel universes in modern-day London, set within the live jazz scene.

== Cast ==
- Emilia Clarke as Ivy
- Jack Farthing as Noah
- Édgar Ramírez as Diego
- Femi Koleoso as Femi
- Molly Gromadzki as Lara
- Manuela Mora as Sophia
- Diana Noris Smith as Tina
- Triana Terry as Katie

== Production ==
The film is written and directed by Drake Doremus and produced by 42, Mutressa and Fetisoff Illusion. Elika Portnoy, Gleb Fetisov, Ben Pugh and Kate Buckley are producers alongside Doremus and John Palfery Smith. Dan Romer composed the score for the film.

The cast is led by Emilia Clarke, Édgar Ramírez and Jack Farthing. The film has musician Femi Koleoso of the British jazz band Ezra Collective in a first acting role.

Principal photography took place in London in December 2024.

== Release ==
Next Life premiered at the Tribeca Festival on June 5, 2026. In June 2026, Vertigo Releasing acquired the U.K. and Ireland distribution rights, for a late 2026 release.
