= Judith A. Hill =

Irish architectural historian (born 1959)

Judith Hill
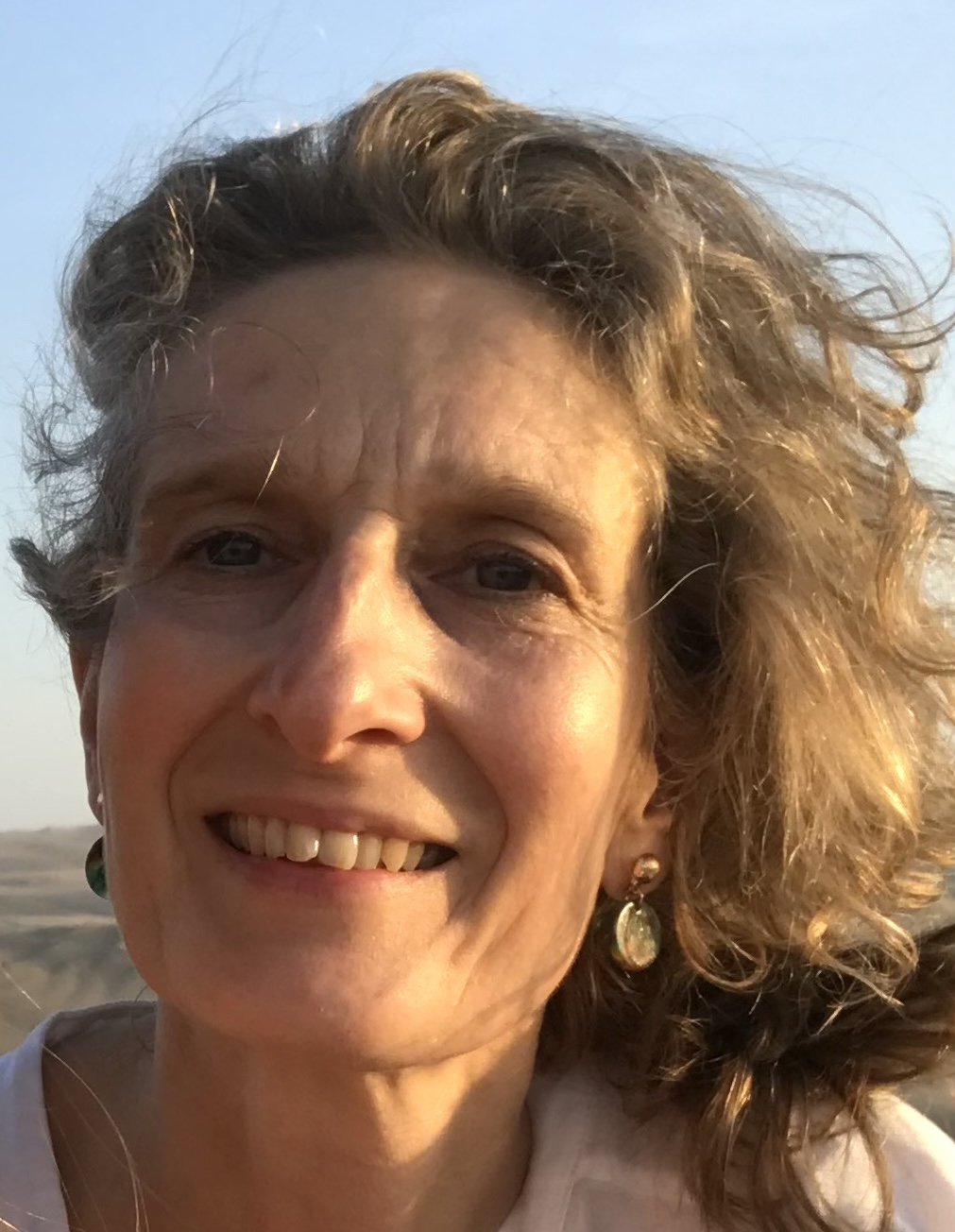
- Hill in 2019
- Born: Judith Alison Hill; 30 October 1959 (age 67)

Academic background
- Education: North London Collegiate School
- Alma mater: University of Cambridge (MA), Trinity College Dublin (PhD)

Judith Alison Hill (born 30 October 1959) is an Irish architectural historian, built heritage consultant and author, best known for her biography of Anglo-Irish dramatist and folklorist Lady Gregory.

== Education ==
Hill was born in London and educated at North London Collegiate School. She graduated from Girton College, Cambridge in 1982 with a BA in the History of Art and from Oxford Polytechnic (now Oxford Brooks University) in 1989 with a diploma in architecture. She was awarded a PhD in Architectural History in 2016 by Trinity College Dublin with a thesis on the Gothic revival in post-Union Ireland.

== Career ==
Hill moved to Ireland in 1989. After completing The Building of Limerick (1991), Hill developed a business as a built heritage consultant. She published Irish Public Sculpture in 1998. This was followed by two biographies, Lady Gregory: An Irish Life (2005) on the Anglo-Irish dramatist, folklorist, theatre manager and leader of the Irish Literary Revival, and In Search of Islands: A Life of Conor O’Brien (2009), on the Anglo-Irish architect, author, mountaineer and pioneering sailor.

Hill has published widely on art and architectural history, and appeared on Irish TV and radio, most recently in the two-part RTÉ documentary on Lady Gregory starring Miriam Margolyes and Lynn Ruane. She is currently visiting research fellow, Trinity College Dublin. She is a contributor on art and architecture to the Irish Arts Review and Country Life (magazine).

== Critical reception of Lady Gregory: An Irish Life ==
In The Times Literary Supplement, Declan Kiberd wrote: "Judith Hill, a noted architectural historian with a deep feeling for the houses in which this story is enacted, does very well in raising Gregory's profile as a cultural revivalist, but she also makes a spirited case for her as a folk artist. Her book, at once judicious and warm, is a nuanced portrait of her subject's role in the invention of modern Ireland, a role which Gregory herself discharged with a similar blend of discretion and feeling. [Augusta Gregory's] time has come – and in this impressive and affecting study Judith Hill does Lady Gregory justice."

In Books Ireland, Robert Greacen wrote: "Judith Hill, in this well-researched and lucidly written biography ... reveals the passionate woman behind the cold, somber mask. In short, it brings to vivid life the story of a remarkable Irishwoman who, in a farewell note to Yeats, could truly say, “I have had a full life.”

== Publications ==
Books:

- The Building of Limerick, 1991, Mercier Press, Cork and Dublin.
- Irish Public Sculpture: A History, 1998, Four Courts Press, Dublin.
- Lady Gregory: An Irish Life, 2005, recent reprint 2023, Sutton Publishing, Stroud.
- In Search Of Islands: A Life Of Conor O'Brien, 2009, The Collins Press, Cork.
- An Introduction to the Architectural Heritage of Limerick City (Environment, Heritage and Local Government, Dublin, 2008).
- An Introduction to the Architectural Heritage of County Limerick (Environment, Heritage and Local Government, Dublin, 2011).
- Gothic: Building Castles In Post-Union Ireland, 2026, Four Courts Press, Dublin.

Selected articles and chapters in books:

- "Finding a voice: Augusta Gregory, Raftery, and Cultural Nationalism, 1899–1900", Irish University Review, 34:1 (2004), 21–36.
- "Lady Gregory’" in David Holdeman and Ben Levitas (eds), W.B. Yeats in context (Cambridge University Press, Cambridge, 2010), pp 129–138
- "Gothic in Post-Union Ireland: the uses of the past in Adare, Co. Limerick", in Terence Dooley and Christopher Ridgeway (eds), Irish Country Houses, Past, Present and Future, (Four Courts Press, Dublin, 2011), pp 58–89
- "Architecture in the aftermath of Union: building the Viceregal Chapel in Dublin Castle, 1801–1815", Architectural History (journal), Vol. 60 (2017), 183–217
