= Silent Roar =

British drama film

- Ukrainian theatrical release poster
- Directed by: Johnny Barrington
- Screenplay by: Johnny Barrington
- Produced by: Chris Young
- Starring: Louis McCartney; Ella Lily Hyland
- Production companies: BBC Film; Screen Scotland; Young Films; BFI
- Distributed by: British Film Institute
- Release date: 18 August 2023 (Edinburgh)
- Running time: 90 minutes
- Country: United Kingdom
- Language: English

Silent Roar is a 2023 British film. It is written and directed by Johnny Barrington in his feature length debut.

== Synopsis ==
Dondo (McCartney) is a young surfer mourning his father’s disappearance at sea with a crush on Sas, who dreams of escaping the island. Dondo’s behaviour is further altered by an unusual church minister’s arrival on the island.

== Cast ==
- Louis McCartney as Dondo
- Ella Lily Hyland as Sas
- Fiona Bell as Norma
- Victoria Balnaves as Veronica
- Anders Hayward as Kenny
- Pablo Raybould as Norman
- Chinenwy Ezeude as Swiss Jesus
- Tip Cullen as Willy
- Mark Lockyer as Reverend Paddy

== Production ==
Written and directed by Johnny Barrington, the film is set in the Outer Hebrides. The picture is produced by Chris Young. The film had support from Screen Scotland, BBC Film, and the BFI.

=== Filming ===
Principal photography began in Scotland in September 2021. Filming locations included the Isle of Skye.

== Release ==
The film had its world premiere at the Edinburgh International Film Festival on August 18, 2023. It has been awarded the high-profile opening gala slot at the festival.
