= Girl in the Year Above =

Irish–Cornish band

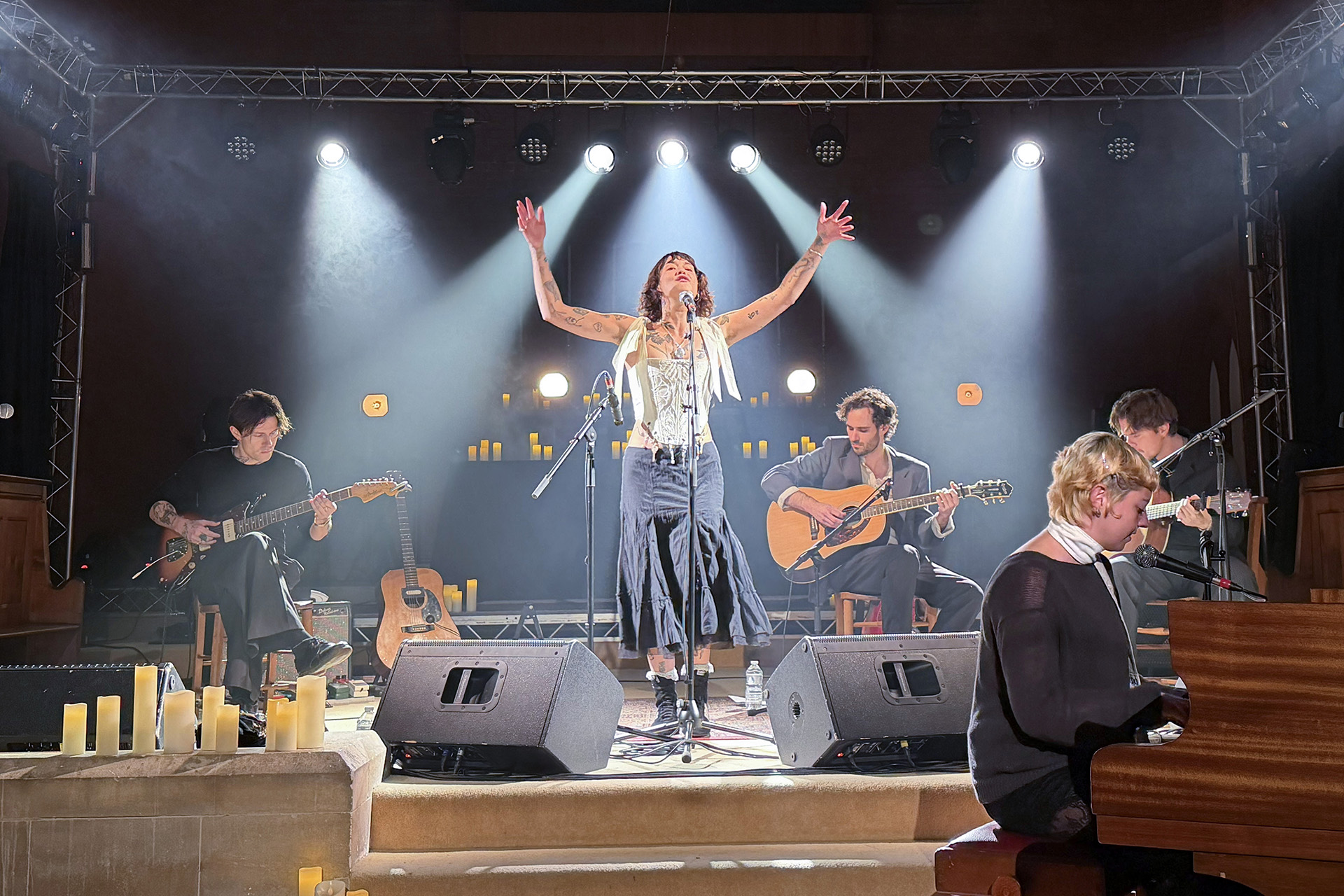

Background information
- Origin: UK / Ireland
- Years active: 2024–present
- Members: Jennifer Ball; Jeanie White; David Kennedy; Shane Kennedy; Nathan Coen; Kapil Trivedi
- Website: https://girlintheyearabove.com

Girl in the Year Above are an Irish–Cornish band. Their debut single “Teardrop” reached number 83 on the UK Singles Sales Chart, according to the Official Charts Company. They appeared in the June/July 2026 edition of Rolling Stone UK, as one of 25 "Future of Music 2026" acts.

== History ==
The band's early singles received airplay on UK national radio, including BBC Radio 1, BBC Radio 2, and BBC Radio 6 Music.

In 2026, following the release of their "Teardrop" cover, singer Jennifer Ball appeared on BBC Radio 2's The Jo Whiley Show for an interview with Edith Bowman. The band have also been included in regional broadcasts, such as BBC Music Introducing and on Irish radio stations, including RTE Radio and Cork's 96FM.

During press for the release of the Peaky Blinders: The Immortal Man film, Jennifer Ball was pictured on the red carpet alongside Martin Slattery and Antony Genn, Tom Coll and Carlos O'Connell of Fontaines D.C..

The band were named as the BBC Introducing "Need to Know" artist for November 2026, receiving significant airplay on BBC Radio 1.

== Live performances ==
The group performed at a range of festivals on the 2026 circuit, and as a support act for several established artists, including dates with Razorlight and Wolf Alice at the Eden Sessions. Throughout 2026, the band served as the opening act for the European and outdoor forest legs of The Kooks' anniversary tour.

The band made their television performance debut on the Irish music series Other Voices, filming an acoustic set at Barryscourt Castle for the program's Anam Sessions. The show aired on RTÉ2 on September 10th 2026.

== Band members ==
Current members

- Jennifer Ball – vocals
- David Kennedy – electric guitar
- Shane Kennedy – guitar, bass
- Nathan Coen – guitar, bass
- Jeanie White – keys, vocals
- Kapil Trivedi – drums

== Discography ==
=== Singles ===
==== "Teardrop" (Massive Attack cover) (2026) ====
Released on the Peaky Blinders: The Immortal Man soundtrack, the song reached number 83 on the UK Singles Sales Chart, and was in the top 10 most searched songs on Shazam for the UK and Ireland at the end of March 2026. The song also received praise from Massive Attack's Robert Del Naja.

==== "Mama, My Heart Is Achin'" (2026) ====
Debut original single, which received national support via BBC Music Introducing.

==== "Ode To The Glory Days" (2026) ====
Second original single, which was listed on Rolling Stone UK's "Hot New Songs" playlist for the week, and also received national support on BBC Radio.

==== "Wet Paint" (2026) ====
Third original single, the band's first release after signing to Transgressive Records. The song was released alongside a video overseen by Dylan Friese-Greene and Jennifer Ball. The song premiered on UK national radio on Huw Stephens' BBC Radio 6 show on the day of release, 22nd September 2026, and was also listed on Rolling Stone UK's "Hot New Songs" playlist for the week. The song received support on BBC Radio both nationally and locally, especially from Jess Iszatt, and was named the BBC Radio 1 "Tune of the Week" for the week beginning 30th October 2026.
