= Louis McCartney =

Irish actor

- Born: 27 July 2003 (age 23); Belfast, Northern Ireland
- Education: Bow Street Academy
- Occupation: Actor
- Years active: 2019-present

Louis McCartney (born 27 July 2003) is a Northern Irish actor. He is best known for originating the role of Henry Creel in the original West End and Broadway stage productions of Stranger Things: The First Shadow, which earned him a nomination for the Tony Award for Best Lead Actor in a Play.

== Early life and education ==
McCartney was born on 27 July 2003 in Belfast to Michael and Ruth McCartney, a screenwriter and holistic therapist, respectively. He has an older brother who works as an ocean explorer. He studied acting at Bow Street Academy, Dublin.

== Career ==
In 2022, McCartney appeared in Comedy Blaps episode William of Orangedale on Channel 4. He had small roles in The Tourist and Game of Thrones. He had a recurring role as Shay O’Hare in Northern Ireland crime drama series Hope Street.

McCartney could be seen in the lead role in 2023 British film Silent Roar. His performance was described by Peter Bradshaw in The Guardian as “intelligent and sympathetic”.

In December 2023, he made his London West End theatre debut in Stranger Things: The First Shadow playing Henry Creel. 20 years old at the start of the run, he had never been in a West End Theatre prior to his casting. David Benedict in Variety said the success of the play "is due in no small part to the way [McCartney] holds focus even in the midst of one coup-de-theatre after another". He won Best Performer in a Play at The Stage Debut Awards in 2024. He reprised the role when the play transferred to Broadway in the United States, appearing from April 2025, at the Marquis Theatre in New York, where he received multiple award nominations for his performance including the Tony Award for Best Actor in a Play.

== Acting credits ==
=== Film and television ===
Year	Title	Role	Notes
2019	Game of Thrones	King's Landing Citizen	1 episode
2019	Grounding	David	Short
2020-2023	Hope Street	Shay O'Hare	22 episodes
2022	William of Orangedale	Nathan	
2023	Silent Roar	Dondo	Lead role
2023	Crusts	Fergal	Short
2024	The Tourist	Cashier	Series two
2025	Behind the Curtain: Stranger Things: The First Shadow	Himself (Henry Creel)	Documentary
2026	Time	James Hennessey	Main character for series three
TBA	Assassin's Creed †	TBA	Recurring role
TBA	Hamburg Days †	Ringo Starr	Upcoming

=== Theatre ===
Year	Title	Role	Notes
2023–2024	Stranger Things: The First Shadow	Henry Creel	Phoenix Theatre, West End
2025–2026	Stranger Things: The First Shadow	Henry Creel	Marquis Theatre, Broadway

== See also ==
- List of Irish actors
