= Packy Lee =

Northern Irish actor (born 1981/82)

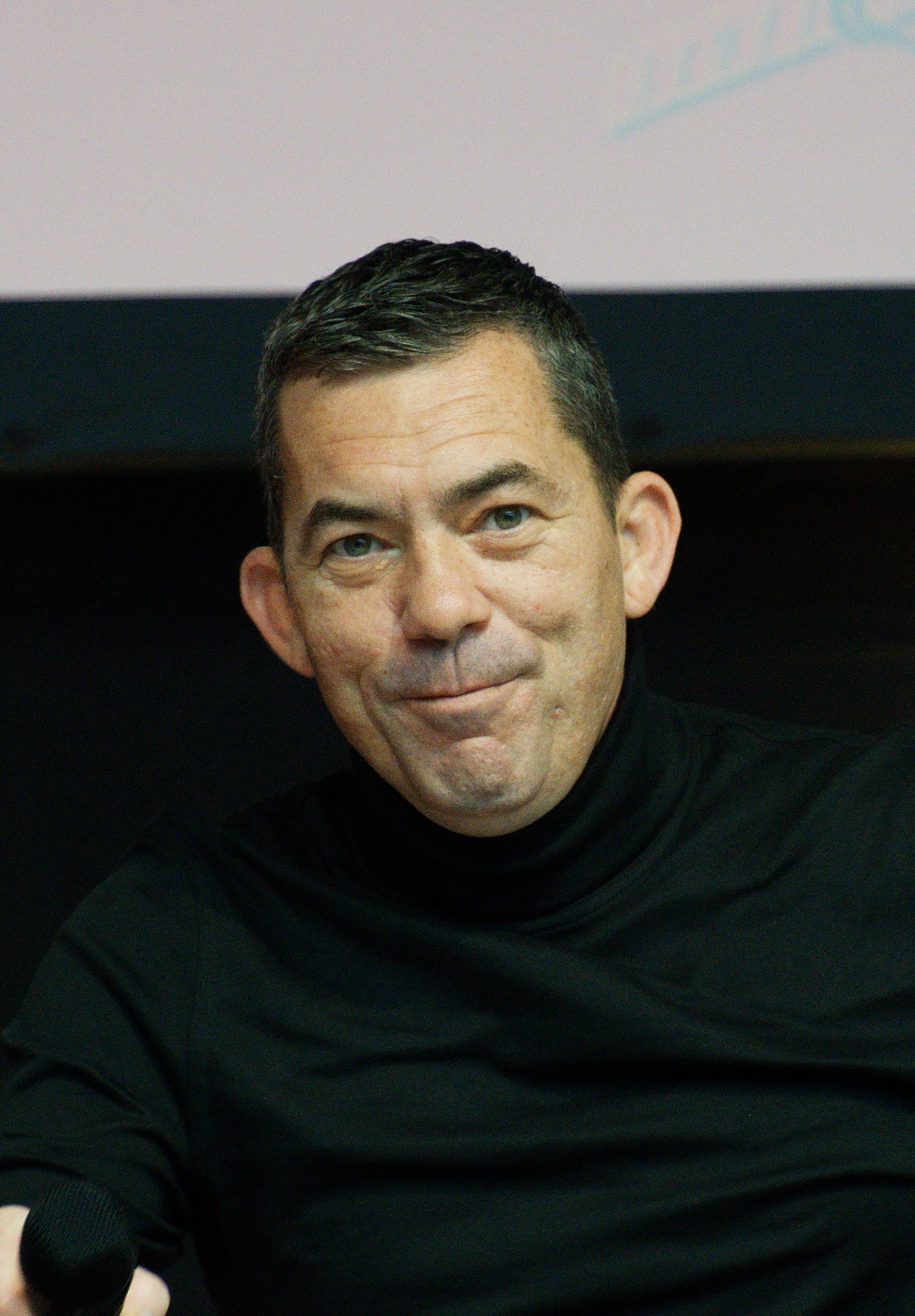
- Born: 1981 or 1982 (age 44–45); Belfast, Northern Ireland
- Occupation: Actor
- Years active: 1998-present
- Known for: Peaky Blinders
- Spouse: Danielle
- Children: 3

Patrick Lee is an Irish stage, television and film actor. He is known for his recurring role on Peaky Blinders as Johnny Dogs.

== Career ==
=== Stage ===
His stage career began with a youth production of Oliver! at the Lyric Theatre. In 2023, he appeared on stage at the Lyric Theatre portraying Gerry Adams in Owen McCafferty's play Agreement.

=== Film and television ===
He appeared as Johnny Dogs in the television series Peaky Blinders. He was given the role by Peaky Blinders creator Steven Knight after seeing his performance in 2012 film King of the Travellers.

His television and film appearances have also included Derry Girls, Academy award-winning short film The Shore and British television period crime drama series The Frankenstein Chronicles. He appeared in 2019 film A Good Woman Is Hard to Find.

He reprised his role as Johnny Dogs in the 2026 Peaky Blinders spinoff film The Immortal Man.

== Personal life ==
He is from West Belfast. He has relatives in the Travelling community who he says gave him positive feedback for his performance in King of the Travellers and Peaky Blinders. He is married to Danielle and as of 2016 they have three children, Fódhla, Seadhna and Dallan.

Lee revealed in a 2019 interview that teachers laughed at him for wanting to become an actor and that classmates would bully him and call him a “sissy” for being into drama.

== Filmography ==
=== Film ===
Year	Title	Role	Notes
1998	Titanic Town	Hijack Youth	Film
2000	Accelerator	Hood 2	Film
2000	Blamm! Blamm!	Hood	Short
2001	H3	Terry	Film
2002	The Escapist	Trusty	Film
2005	Endgame	Michael	Short
2005	Pretty Face	Cellmate	Short
2009	Pumpgirl	Doot	Film
2011	Killing Bono	Security Guard	Film
2011	The Shore	Jackie	Short film
2012	Jump	Jack	Film
2012	King of the Travellers	Eamon	Film
2014	Shooting for Socrates	Wigsy	Film
2018	Float Like a Butterfly	Uncle Joe	Film
2019	A Good Woman Is Hard to Find	Mackers	Film
2020	Pixie	Tommy	Film
2021	Free Fall	Cooper	Short
2026	Peaky Blinders: The Immortal Man	Johnny Dogs	Film

=== Television ===
Year	Title	Role	Notes
2002	As the Beast Sleeps	Wee Rab	TV Movie
2003	Holy Cross	Flag Man	TV Movie
2003	You Looking at Me?	Kenny	TV Movie
2004	Pulling Moves	Cheeky Hood	TV series
2005	ShakespeaRe-Told	Heaney	TV series
2006	Murphy's Law	Drew Johnson Jnr	TV series
2007	The Bill	Craig Evans	TV series
2010	George Best: From Football Boots to Dancing Shoes	Self	TV series
2013–2022	Peaky Blinders	Johnny Dogs	TV series
2015	Clean Break	Teeth	TV series
2015	The Frankenstein Chronicles	Sears	TV series
2017-2021	Soccer AM	Self	TV series
2019	The Witcher	Nohorn	TV series
2022	National Television Awards	Self	TV Special
2022	Derry Girls	Jordy	TV series
2023	Blue Lights	JP Senior	TV series
2026	Tall Tales & Murder	Wesley Swanson	TV series
