= Johnny Barrington =

Scottish film director and screenwriter

- Born: Isle of Skye, Scotland
- Occupations: Film director, screenwriter
- Years active: 2005–present
- Known for: Silent Roar

Johnny Barrington is a Scottish film director and screenwriter from the Isle of Skye. His short films Trout (2006) and Tumult (2012) were both selected for the Sundance Film Festival. Trout was nominated for the Russell Hunter Award for Best Short Film at the British Academy Scotland Awards in 2006, and Tumult for Best Short Film at the 66th British Academy Film Awards in 2013. His first feature film, Silent Roar, premiered as the opening film of the Edinburgh International Film Festival in 2023.

== Early life and education ==
Barrington grew up on the Isle of Skye. He worked as a ship's photographer in the Pacific and Caribbean before studying photography. He attended the Glasgow School of Art and the Gothenburg School of Photography and Film, and went on to direct experimental short films and music videos, some of which were shown on MTV.

== Career ==
=== Short films ===
Barrington's early short films include Trout (2006) (Note: Cove Park and Eye for Film date Trout to 2006; IMDb and Sigma Films give 2007.) and Terra Firma (2007). (Note: Cove Park dates Terra Firma to 2007; Sigma Films gives 2008.)

Trout, produced by Anna Duffield, was nominated for the Russell Hunter Award for Best Short Film at the 2006 British Academy Scotland Awards. It screened in the International Shorts: Dramatic programme at the 2007 Sundance Film Festival and at festivals internationally.

Terra Firma, set on a North Sea ferry, was made for the Cinema Extreme scheme with funding from the UK Film Council and Film4.

Tumult (2012) follows a group of Norse warriors who encounter an unexpected group of people while travelling through a barren landscape after a battle. It was made by Skye-based Young Films with support from Creative Scotland and Channel 4, which broadcast the film in 2013.

Tumult was selected for the 2012 Sundance Film Festival and nominated for the BAFTA Award for Best Short Film at the 66th British Academy Film Awards in 2013.

=== Feature films ===
Barrington's first feature film, Silent Roar, is set on the Isle of Lewis in the Outer Hebrides. It follows Dondo, a teenage surfer struggling to accept his father's death, and his relationship with his classmate Sas. The film stars Louis McCartney, Ella Lily Hyland and Mark Lockyer.

The film was produced by Chris Young for Young Films and backed by BBC Film, the British Film Institute and Screen Scotland, which awarded £500,000 from its Film Development and Production Fund. It was shot over six weeks from September 2021, entirely on the Isle of Lewis and largely in and around the community of Uig.

Silent Roar had its world premiere as the opening film of the 2023 Edinburgh International Film Festival, which that year was hosted by the Edinburgh International Festival.

==== Reception ====
Writing in The Guardian, Peter Bradshaw gave the film three stars out of five, finding humour and charm in it and noting echoes of Bill Forsyth. Reviewing the film for Sight & Sound, Tim Hayes wrote that its tone shifts markedly but found much to admire in Barrington's handling of his two young characters. Cineuropa also drew comparisons with Forsyth, describing the film as a confident debut. The film was also reviewed in Variety.

== Recognition ==
In 2014, Barrington held a residency at Cove Park, where he developed a screenplay for a proposed feature, Aberdeen Angus.

In 2022, he was one of eleven participants in the inaugural Rising Stars Scotland showcase, a joint initiative of Screen International and Screen Scotland intended to promote emerging Scottish filmmakers and actors to the international industry.

== Filmography ==
Year	Title	Notes
2005	Trawler	Short film
2006	Trout	Short film; Sundance selection; British Academy Scotland Awards nominee
2007	Terra Firma	Short film; Cinema Extreme
2012	Tumult	Short film; Sundance selection; BAFTA nominee
2023	Silent Roar	Feature film; Edinburgh International Film Festival opening film
