= Jan-Ole Gerster =

German film director and screenwriter (born 1978)

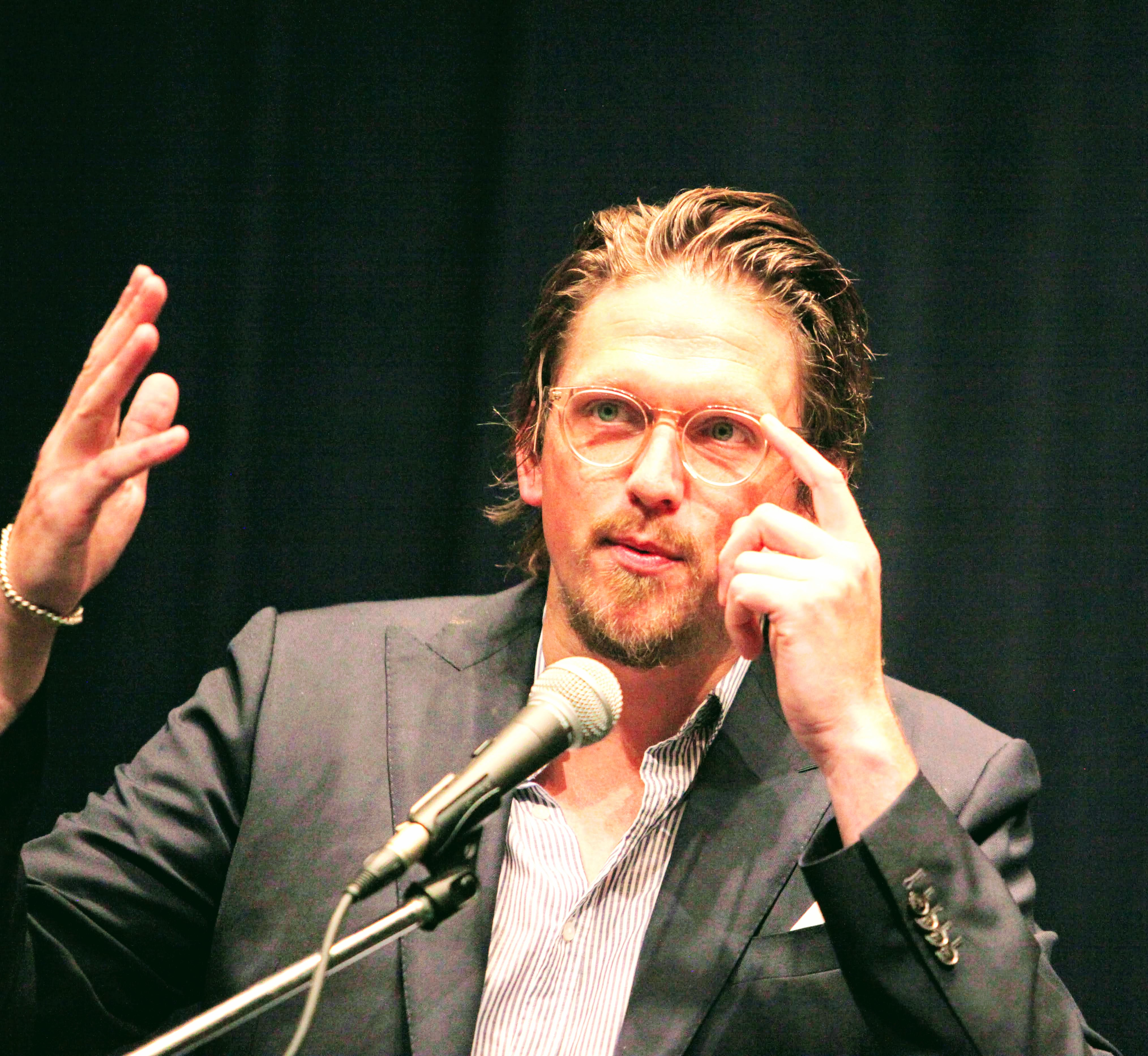
- Jan-Ole Gerster in 2019.
- Born: Jan-Ole Gerster; 1978 (age 47–48); Hagen, West Germany
- Occupations: Filmmaker, screenwriter, producer
- Years active: 2004–present
- Notable work: A Coffee in Berlin

Jan-Ole Gerster (born 1978 in Hagen) is a German film director and screenwriter.

== Life ==
Gerster works as a film director and screenwriter in Germany.

He was a TorinoFilmLab AdaptLab participant in 2016.

== Filmography ==
- 2004: Der Schmerz geht, der Film bleibt (documentary film, director)
- 2006: A Friend of Mine (actor)
- 2012: A Coffee in Berlin (director and screenwriter)
- 2019: Lara (director)
- 2025: Islands (director and screenwriter)

== Awards ==
- 2013: Deutscher Filmpreis
- 2013: Romy
- 2013: New Faces Award
- 2019: Karlovy Vary International Film Festival
- 2019: Les Arcs Film Festival
- 2019: Filmfest München
