= Caimh McDonnell =

Irish novelist

Caimh McDonnell (/kwiːv/, KWEEV) is an Irish writer. Born in Limerick, raised in Dublin, and later based in Manchester, McDonnell is a former stand-up comedian and TV writer. McDonnell writes comic crime thrillers and humorous paranormal fantasy.

== Early life and education ==
McDonnell was born in Limerick and grew up in Dublin. He attended Dublin City University graduating with a degree in Electronic Engineering, and started his career assembling computer servers.

== Writing career ==
After a career of many years in stand-up comedy, McDonnell became a full-time writer. He has written twenty novels while his TV writing credits include Have I Got News for You, Mock the Week, A League of Their Own, The Sarah Millican Television Programme and the BAFTA nominated-children's CBBC animated series Pet Squad which he created.

His Stranger Times series, which melds urban fantasy, paranormal and humour with crime, is written under the pen name of C. K. McDonnell.

== Recognition ==
His novel I Have Sinned was shortlisted for the Kindle Storyteller Award in 2019.

The Stranger Times series was nominated and shortlisted for The New Kid on the Block Award (Best New Crime Series) Dead Good Reader Award 2022. The series was the winner of Best Audio Work at the British Fantasy Awards 2023.

== Media ==
Both The Dublin Trilogy and The Stranger Times series have been optioned for television. Tall Tales & Murder, based loosely on The Dublin Trilogy, is expected on RTÉ in late 2026.

== Works ==
=== Novels ===
==== The Dublin "trilogy" ====
- A Man With One of Those Faces (2016)
- The Day That Never Comes (2017)
- Angels in the Moonlight (2017) (prequel)
- Last Orders (2018)
- Dead Man's Sins (2021)
- Firewater Blues (2022)
- The Family Jewels (2022)
- Escape From Victory (2023) (Novella)
- Fortunate Son (2024)
- The Man Comes Around (2026)

==== Bunny McGarry (Stateside) series ====
- Disaster Inc (2018)
- I Have Sinned (2019)
- The Quiet Man (2020)
- Other Plans (2023)

==== MCM Investigations series ====
- The Final Game (2020)
- Deccie Must Die (2022)
- Meanwhile in Dublin (2024) (Novella)
- The Big Steal (2026)

==== The Stranger Times (as C.K McDonnell) ====
- The Stranger Times (2021)
- This Charming Man (2022)
- Love Will Tear Us Apart (2023)
- Relight My Fire (2024)
- Ring the Bells (2025)

==== Stand-alone novels ====
- Welcome to Nowhere (2020)
- Ursula und das V-Team (2025 German, English edition TBD, co-written with Elaine Ofori)

=== Short stories ===
==== Short story collections ====
- How to Send a Message (2019)
- Things that Fell from the Sky (2020 as C.K. McDonnell)
- In Other News (2020 as C.K.McDonnell)
- Bunny McGarry: Shorts (2024)
- Tales from the Stranger Times Vol. 1 (2025)

==== Short Story podcasts ====
- The Bunnycast (2018–Present)
- The Stranger Times (2020–Present; 3 seasons)

== Personal life ==
McDonnell lives in Manchester and is married to Elaine Ofori, who runs McFori Ink, a publishing company. He has worked for London Irish rugby club, making stadium announcements.
