= Islands (2025 German film) =

German drama film

- Theatrical release poster
- Directed by: Jan-Ole Gerster
- Screenplay by: Jan-Ole Gerster; Blaž Kutin; Lawrie Doran
- Produced by: Maximilian Leo
- Starring: Sam Riley; Stacy Martin; Jack Farthing
- Cinematography: Juan C. Sarmiento Grisales
- Edited by: Antje Zynga
- Production companies: Augenschein; Leonine
- Distributed by: Leonine
- Release dates: 16 February 2025 (Berlinale); 8 May 2025 (Germany)
- Running time: 121 minutes
- Country: Germany
- Language: English
- Box office: $344,053

Islands is a 2025 German film directed by Jan-Ole Gerster from a script he co-wrote with Blaž Kutin and Lawrie Doran. It stars Sam Riley, Stacy Martin and Jack Farthing. The film premiered at 75th Berlin International Film Festival in the Berlinale Special section on 16 February 2025.

== Plot ==
On the island of Fuerteventura, former tennis pro Tom is an instructor at a hotel resort. He spends his days in a monotony of tennis lessons for tourists, and fills his nights with a blur of drinking, drugs, and one-night stands. His aimless routine is disrupted by Anne, a guest who requests private lessons for her young son, Anton, and Tom soon meets her husband, Dave.

When Tom arranges for a better room at the hotel, the family invite him to dinner as thanks, revealing that Anne gave up her career as a television actress while Dave failed at running her father's company. At Anne's suggestion, Tom shows them the island, exploring its lava caves and beaches; frustrated with her husband, Anne seems drawn to Tom.

The family meets Tom's friends Raik and Amina at their camel farm, where Raik tells the story of Tom besting a visiting Rafael Nadal. Tom joins Anne and Dave for a drink at the hotel, but tensions rise over their rushed marriage and difficulties having another child. Jealous of Tom's unattached life, Dave convinces the reluctant Tom to bring him to a local club, "The Waikīkī", for a night of drinking. In the morning, Tom awakens on the beach alone, and learns from Anne that Dave is missing.

Tom and Anne retrace his steps to the club, and she appears to find Dave's abandoned phone. They report her husband's disappearance to police officer Jorge, who assumes he has spent the night with another woman. A band of surfers from the club explain that Dave behaved erratically and shared unkind secrets about his wife. To Tom's surprise, Anne suggests that Dave has killed himself. An itinerant local is caught with Dave's wallet and shoes, leading the police to find Dave's clothes discarded on the shore.

Police Inspector Mazo arrives from Lanzarote to head the investigation, revealing that Anne deleted the record of a phone call from Dave before he disappeared. Anne admits that Dave had been diagnosed with infertility and suspected that he was not Anton's father; he called her that night, threatening to jump off a cliff unless she told him the truth. Faced with security footage of her leaving the hotel after the call, Anne storms off. Tom looks after Anton for the day when his mother fails to answer her phone, but she returns after dark.

While police search the island, Jorge warns Tom that Mazo suspects Anne of foul play. Tom is unsettled by Anne's casual attitude as she hints at moving to the island, and she draws attention by enjoying martinis, swimming topless, and shopping as the search for Dave continues. When Mazo claims to have an incriminating witness, Tom lies that Anne left the hotel to see him, and a body pulled from the ocean is discovered to be Raik and Amina's missing camel. Anne and Tom give in to their mutual attraction, spending the night together.

The next day, Dave is found alive, naked and delirious after trying to reach a nearby volcano, and is reunited with his family at the hospital. Tom remains uneasy, but Jorge assures him that the case is closed. Drinking at The Waikīkī, Tom is goaded into a game of serves against a tourist, and wins their bet before passing out on the court. He is woken by Dave, who thanks him for his help with a generous tip, and watches Anne depart with her family without saying goodbye. Later, Tom impulsively drives to the airport to buy a plane ticket, hesitating when asked where he would like to go.

== Cast ==
- Sam Riley as Tom
- Stacy Martin as Anne
- Jack Farthing as Dave
- Dylan Torrell as Anton
- Fatima Adoum as Amina

== Production ==
The film is directed by Jan-Ole Gerster from a script he wrote with Blaž Kutin and Lawrie Doran. It is produced by Augenschein in co-production with German studio Leonine, which has German distribution rights. The cast is led by Sam Riley, and also contains Stacy Martin, Jack Farthing and Dylan Torrell.

Filming took place in Corralejo and Pájara on the isle of Fuerteventura in the Canary Islands in 2023.

In February 2024, Deadline Hollywood reported that the film was in post-production.

== Release ==
Islands had its world premiere on 16 February 2025, as part of the 75th Berlin International Film Festival, in Berlinale Special.

Islands won the grand prize for best film at the Reims Polar 2025 festival.

The film was released theatrically in Germany on 8 May.

== Reception ==
=== Critical response ===
On the review aggregator website Rotten Tomatoes, 96% of 24 critics' reviews are positive, with an average rating of 7.60/10. The website's consensus reads: "A glossy, slow burn thriller carried by soulful performances, Islands compellingly explores loneliness with artful restraint and intoxicating atmosphere." Metacritic, which uses a weighted average, assigned the film a score of 77 out of 100, based on 6 critics, indicating "generally favorable" reviews.
