= Cuchulain of Muirthemne =

Cuchulain of Muirthemne is a version of the Cú Chulainn legends based on previous oral and written versions, as collected and translated by Lady Augusta Gregory. First published in 1902, it is one of the earliest such collections to appear in English. The book covers the lifespan of the hero, from conception to death, and draws on folklore and oral tradition in addition to the stories of the Ulster Cycle.

== Background ==
Lady Gregory considered herself a supporter of the Irish Literary Revival, rather than a writer. She recorded in her diary that "I dreamed that I had been writing some article & that W.B.Y. said 'It's not your business to write – Your business is to make an atmosphere'". She undertook the book only after William Butler Yeats refused an offer to translate his own edition of Irish myth.

In 1900, a commission on education in Ireland issued a report, declaring Irish literature to be devoid of idealism or imagination. This report, written by Trinity College Professor Robert Atkinson and parroted by Professor John Pentland Mahaffy, infuriated the Gaelic League, its founder Douglas Hyde, and Irish nationalists, including Yeats and Gregory.

Later that same year, English publisher Alfred Nutt asked Yeats to compose a collection, which would retell Irish myth and legend. Yeats refused, excusing himself as being too busy with his own work. Lady Gregory volunteered instead, initially hoping that the work might serve as a source of raw material to nationalist poets, as well as a rebuttal to critics of Irish literature like Atkinson and Mahaffy. At first, she lacked confidence in her writing abilities, and expected the work to take her a lifetime. After she earned the encouragement of Yeats, the work went to press in less than two years.

== Influences ==
Lady Gregory used many sources and looked to many literary figures within her social circle in her styling and writing of her version of the Cú Chulainn myths.

Two of Lady Gregory's cousins published books relating to Irish myth. Standish James O'Grady published his History of Ireland: The Heroic Period in 1878, which included tales about Cú Chulainn, Deirdre, and Medb. Standish Hayes O'Grady (often confused with his cousin) published the Silva Gadelica in 1892: a corpus which does not include Cú Chulainn himself, but does contain stories of his kinsmen.

Nutt himself had also written a pamphlet on Cú Chulainn entitled Cuhulain, The Irish Achilles. He also referred Lady Gregory to Eleanor Hull. Her book, The Cuchulain Saga in Irish Literature related many tales of the hero, though not connected in the manner Lady Gregory would edit her own version.

One of Lady Gregory's closest London friends was Lady Layard (born Mary Enid Evelyn Guest). Lady Layard's mother, Lady Charlotte Guest, upon moving to Wales in 1833, had learned the language and subsequently translated The Mabinogion. This was the first translation of the tales to be published.

Yeats recalled Nutt's suggestion of Thomas Malory's Le Morte d'Arthur as a model for the translation, and Lady Gregory wrote of the work in her diary as a guide for selecting and weaving together her disparate sources with pleasing, literary prose.

== Style ==
Lady Gregory translated her materials into a dialect which she referred to as Kiltartanese, her version of the dialect spoken in her home barony of Kiltartan. The dialect was a version of the English language, but using the syntax of the Gaelic languages. The effect is not overwhelming for the reader, however, and is quite readable.

The ultimate goal of Lady Gregory's translation efforts was to produce an edition of the Cú Chulainn legends which would be accessible to a general audience. She felt many of the earlier translations suffered from their attempts to make a literal translation in current English of the original stylised and courtly written Gaelic, resulting in language that could be awkward at times. Instead, she sought a more indigenous Irish style, familiar to her through her efforts at collecting local folklore. With the help of Sean Connolly, she undertook an experiment in translation. Connolly, an Irish speaker, translated a section of the legend into spoken Irish, which Lady Gregory then translated literally into English. The results convinced her that the colloquial Hiberno-English of Kiltartan retained much of the character of the old language, and that it would be an acceptable translation tool.

== Reception ==
Cuchulain of Muirthemne proved a financial success, selling out four editions within ten years. It remained profitable throughout the 1920s, averaging Lady Gregory 30 pounds a year in royalties until her death.

As her first published book, Cuchulain of Muirthemne also earned Lady Gregory a place of power as a writer within the Irish Revival. Yeats was hugely supportive of the book, beginning his introduction to the work by declaring it "…the best that has come out of Ireland in my time," and eventually writing five plays around the legends. George Russell and J.M. Synge offered enthusiastic praise as well.

In the United States, the book earned the admiration of Theodore Roosevelt and Mark Twain.

Douglas Hyde had mixed feelings about the effort at first, declaring her vernacular translation style unsuitable for ancient myth (an opinion shared by her cousin Standish James). As an advocate of the Irish language, Hyde also worried that a popular English version would discourage those otherwise driven to learn Irish. However, upon seeing her work, Hyde warmed, offering information, sources, and encouragement towards its completion.

In his memoir Hail and Farewell, George Moore, formerly a comrade of Lady Gregory and Yeats in the Irish Literary Theatre, accused Lady Gregory of plagiarizing her materials for the work.

Many today see Cuchulain of Muirthemne as an overly prudish, even censored version of the tales, removing mentions of sexuality and body functions. Lady Gregory, and Nutt as publisher, had to respect the legal and social realities of a country observant at that time of the Catholic theology of sexuality, and the compromises do not detract from the basic story. The modern Irish critic Declan Kiberd has declared the work to be "an Irish classic".

== Sources ==
- Hill, Judith (2005), Lady Gregory: An Irish Life, Sutton Publishing
- Kiberd, Declan (1996), Inventing Ireland: The Literature of the Modern Nation, London: Vintage, ISBN 978-009958221-2
- Kohfeldt, Mary Lou (1985), Lady Gregory: A Biography, New York: Atheneum
- Tóibín, Colm (2002), Lady Gregory's Toothbrush, University of Wisconsin Press, ISBN 978-029918000-3
