= Bridesmaid (band) =

American instrumental rock band

- Origin: Columbus, Ohio, United States
- Genres: Instrumental rock, Stoner rock
- Years active: 2010 - present
- Members: Bob Brinkman; Scott Hyatt; Cory Barnt; Adam Boehm

Bridesmaid are an instrumental stoner rock band from Columbus, Ohio consisting of two bass players and two drummers.

== History ==
Founded in 2010, the band was initially a trio. The original members were Bob Brinkman and Scott Hyatt on bass guitars and Cory Barnt on drums. Barnt eventually moved and during the transition period both Ricky Thompson and Barnt were drummers and the larger sound inspired Brinkman and Hyatt to keep two drummers. Adam Boehm was added when Barnt left.

Eventually, Thompson left and Barnt returned maintaining the two bass and two drums lineup.

=== Band members ===
Current

- Bob Brinkman, bass
- Scott Hyatt, bass
- Cory Barnt, drums
- Adam Boehm, drums

Past

- Ricky Thompson, drums

== Discography ==
Splits and Compilations

- Sun Splitter/Bridesmaid Split 7" (2011)
- Heavy Haze Wax Mage Records Collection 1 (2016)

EPs

- Davy Jones Industrial Average (2011)

Full-length LPs

- Breakfast At Riffany's (2013)
- International House Of Mancakes (2016)
