= Jack Farthing =

British actor

- Born: 14 October 1985 (age 41); North London, England
- Education: Westminster School; St Catherine's College, Oxford; London Academy of Music and Dramatic Art
- Occupation: Actor
- Years active: 2010–present
- Spouse: Hanako Footman (m. 2025)

Jack Farthing (born 14 October 1985) is a British actor.

== Early life ==
Farthing was born and raised in North London, the son of gastroenterologist Michael Farthing. He attended two independent schools: The Hall School, Hampstead, and Westminster School in central London. He read History of Art at St Catherine's College, Oxford, before attending London Academy of Music and Dramatic Art.

== Career ==
He is notable for playing Freddie Threepwood in Blandings (2013–2014) and villain George Warleggan in the BBC One drama series Poldark (2015–2019). He has also appeared as George Balfour in The Riot Club (2014), Marc Fisher in the Netflix romantic comedy Love Wedding Repeat (2020), Joe in Maggie Gyllenhaal's The Lost Daughter and as Charles, Prince of Wales in the 2021 dramatic film Spencer. For his work as Selby in HBO/BBC Rain Dogs (2023) he was nominated for an Independent Spirit Award for Best Supporting Performance in a New Scripted Series. In 2025, Farthing acted alongside Angelica Huston, Clarke Peters, and Matthew Rhys in the BBC three-part television series Towards Zero, an adaptation of Agatha Christie's novel of the same name, playing the estranged nephew of Huston's matriarch.

== Personal life ==
Farthing is married to actress and writer Hanako Footman, who also appeared in the film Official Secrets.

== Filmography ==
Key
†	Denotes works that have not yet been released

=== Film ===
Year	Title	Role	Ref.
2014	The Riot Club	George Balfour	
2015	Burn Burn Burn	Dan	
2016	Wild	Andrew	
2019	Official Secrets	Andy Dumfries	
2020	Love Wedding Repeat	Marc	
2021	The Lost Daughter	Joe	
2021	Spencer	Charles, Prince of Wales	
2024	Electra	Milo	
2025	Islands	Dave	
2026	Savage House	Reginald Halifax	
2026	Next Life	Noah	Completed

=== Television ===
Year	Title	Role	Notes	Ref.
2012	Pramface	Mitchell	Series 1, episode 4	
2012	Silk	Patrick Telford	Series 2, episode 3	
2013
2013	Dancing on the Edge	Young Waiter	Episode 3	
2013	Da Vinci's Demons	Botticelli	Series 1, episode 4	
2013	Agatha Christie's Poirot	Gerald Paynter	Series 13, episode 2	
2013–2014	Blandings	The Hon. Frederick Threepwood	Series 1 & 2 (13 episodes)	
2014	Cilla	John Lennon	Episodes 1 & 3	
2015–2019	Poldark	George Warleggan	Series 1–5 (43 episodes)	
2018	The ABC Murders	Donald Fraser	Episodes 1–3	
2020	Unsaid Stories	Police Voice (voice)	Episode 3	
2022	Chloe	Richard	Episodes 1–6	
2023	Rain Dogs	Florian Selby	Episodes 1–8	
2023	The Serial Killer's Wife	Tom	Episodes 1–4	
2025	Towards Zero	Thomas Royde	All three episodes	
2025	Amadeus	Alexander Pushkin	Episode 5	
2026	The Rapture	Frasier Meville	Episodes 1–5	
