= Lady Gregory =

Irish playwright, poet and folklorist (1852–1932)

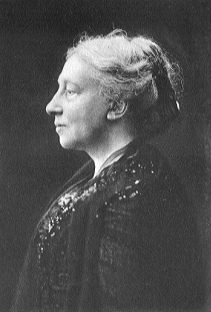
- Gregory pictured on the frontispiece to "Our Irish Theatre: A Chapter of Autobiography" (1913)
- Born: Isabella Augusta Persse; 15 March 1852; Roxborough, County Galway, Ireland
- Died: 22 May 1932 (aged 80); Galway, County Galway, Ireland
- Resting place: New Cemetery, Bohermore, County Galway
- Occupations: Dramatist; folklorist; theatre manager
- Years active: 1882–1932
- Known for: Co-founder of the Abbey Theatre; collection of folklore; playwright
- Notable work: Irish Literary Revival
- Spouse: Sir William Henry Gregory (m. 1880; died 1892)
- Children: Robert
- Relatives: Sir Hugh Lane (nephew)

Isabella Augusta, Lady Gregory (née Persse; 15 March 1852 – 22 May 1932) was an Anglo-Irish dramatist, folklorist and theatre manager. With William Butler Yeats and Edward Martyn, she co-founded the Irish Literary Theatre and the Abbey Theatre, and wrote numerous short works for both companies. Lady Gregory produced a number of books of retellings of stories taken from Irish mythology. Born into a class that identified closely with British rule, she turned against it. Her conversion to cultural nationalism, as evidenced by her writings, was emblematic of many of the political struggles that occurred in Ireland during her lifetime.

Lady Gregory is mainly remembered for her work behind the Irish Literary Revival. Her home at Coole Park in County Galway served as an important meeting place for leading Revival figures, and her early work as a member of the board of the Abbey was at least as important as her creative writings for that theatre's development. Lady Gregory's motto was taken from Aristotle: "To think like a wise man, but to express oneself like the common people."

As a solo playwright, Lady Gregory is known for Spreading the News (1904), a short one-act comic play which she wrote for the opening night of the Abbey Theatre, and Grania (1912). She is also known for her collaboration with W.B. Yeats on the play Cathleen ni Houlihan (1902).

== Life and career ==
=== Early years and marriage ===
Gregory was born at Roxborough, County Galway, the youngest daughter of the Anglo-Irish gentry family Persse. Her mother, Frances Barry, was related to Viscount Guillamore, and her family home, Roxborough, was a 6,000-acre (24 km^{2}) estate located between Gort and Loughrea, the main house of which was later burnt down during the Irish Civil War. She was educated at home, and her future career was strongly influenced by the family nurse (i.e. nanny), Mary Sheridan, a Catholic and a native Irish speaker, who introduced the young Augusta to the history and legends of the local area.

She married Sir William Henry Gregory, a widower with an estate at Coole Park, near Gort, on 4 March 1880 in St. Matthias' Church, Dublin. Sir William, who was 36 years her elder, had just retired from his position as Governor of Ceylon (now Sri Lanka), having previously served several terms as Member of Parliament for County Galway. He was a well-educated man with many literary and artistic interests, and the house at Coole Park housed a large library and extensive art collection, both of which Lady Gregory was eager to explore. He also had a house in London, where the couple spent a considerable amount of time, holding weekly salons frequented by many leading literary and artistic figures of the day, including Robert Browning, Lord Tennyson, John Everett Millais and Henry James. Their only child, Robert Gregory, was born in 1881. He was killed during the First World War while serving as a pilot, an event which inspired W. B. Yeats's poems "An Irish Airman Foresees His Death", "In Memory of Major Robert Gregory" and "Shepherd and Goatherd".

=== Early writings ===
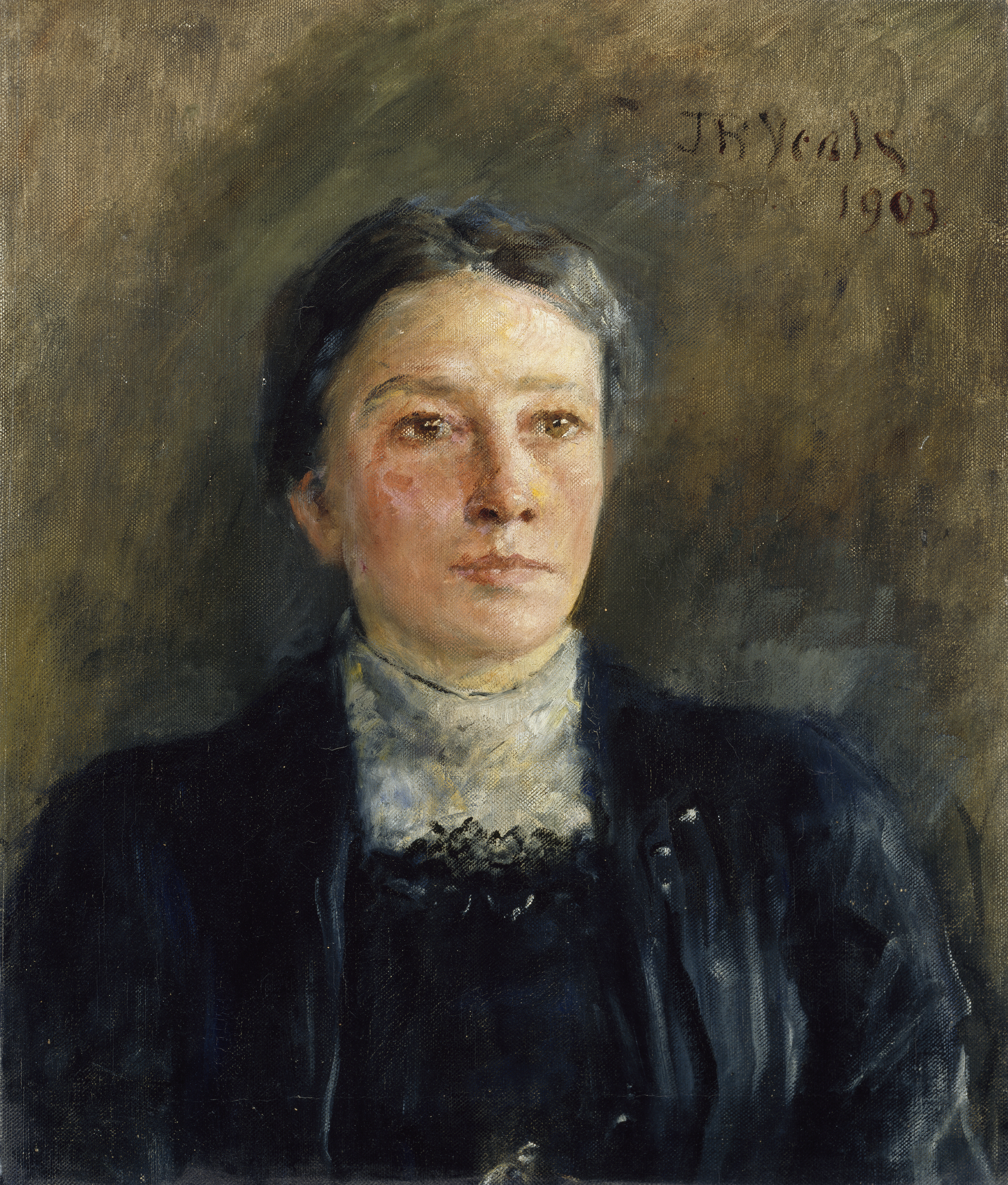
Portrait of Lady Gregory, 1903

The Gregorys travelled in Ceylon, India, Spain, Italy and Egypt. While in Egypt Lady Gregory met, and in 1882 and 1883 had an affair with, the English poet Wilfrid Scawen Blunt, during which she wrote a series of love poems, A Woman's Sonnets.

Her earliest work to appear under her own name was Arabi and His Household (1882), a pamphlet—originally a letter to The Times—in support of Ahmed Orabi Pasha, leader of what has come to be known as the Urabi Revolt, an 1879 Egyptian nationalist revolt against the oppressive regime of the Khedive and the European domination of Egypt. She later said of this booklet, "whatever political indignation or energy was born with me may have run its course in that Egyptian year and worn itself out". Despite this, in 1893 she published A Phantom's Pilgrimage, or Home Ruin, an anti-Nationalist pamphlet against William Ewart Gladstone's proposed second Home Rule Act. The unsigned pamphlet features Egyptian gods sitting in judgment upon Gladstone, and his phantom being shown the results of high taxes and the English government. As James Pethica writes, "With its uncompromising portrayal of a country sliding into anarchy and ruin, the anonymous pamphlet drew appreciative comment from those of Gregory's London friends who knew it to be her work. 'It has been a success,' she noted in her diary[.]"

She continued to write prose during the period of her marriage, including short stories she published under the name "Angus Grey." During the winter of 1883, whilst her husband was in Ceylon, she worked on a series of memoirs of her childhood home, with a view to publishing them under the title An Emigrant's Notebook, but this plan was abandoned. "An Emigrant's Note Book" remained unpublished until it appeared in Lady Gregory's Early Irish Writings 1883-1893 (2018). She wrote a series of pamphlets in 1887 called Over the River, in which she appealed for funds for the parish of St. Stephens in Southwark, south London. She also wrote a number of short stories in the years 1890 and 1891, although these also never appeared in print. A number of unpublished poems from this period have also survived. When Sir William Gregory died in March 1892, Lady Gregory went into mourning and returned to Coole Park; there she edited her husband's autobiography, which she published in 1894. She was to write later, "If I had not married I should not have learned the quick enrichment of sentences that one gets in conversation; had I not been widowed I should not have found the detachment of mind, the leisure for observation necessary to give insight into character, to express and interpret it. Loneliness made me rich—'full', as Bacon says."

=== Cultural nationalism ===
A trip to Inisheer in the Aran Islands in 1893 re-awoke for Lady Gregory an interest in the Irish language and in the folklore of the area in which she lived. She organised Irish lessons at the school at Coole and began collecting tales from the area around her home, especially from the residents of Gort workhouse. One of the tutors she employed was Norma Borthwick, who would visit Coole numerous times. This activity led to the publication of a number of volumes of folk material, including A Book of Saints and Wonders (1906), The Kiltartan History Book (1909) and The Kiltartan Wonder Book (1910). She also produced a number of collections of "Kiltartanese" versions of Irish myths, including Cuchulain of Muirthemne (1902) and Gods and Fighting Men (1903). ("Kiltartanese" is Lady Gregory's term for English with Gaelic syntax, based on the dialect spoken in Kiltartan.) In his introduction to Cuchulain of Muirthemne Yeats wrote "I think this book is the best that has come out of Ireland in my time". James Joyce was to parody this claim in the Scylla and Charybdis chapter of his novel Ulysses.

Towards the end of 1894, encouraged by the positive reception of the editing of her husband's autobiography, Lady Gregory turned her attention to another editorial project. She decided to prepare selections from Sir William Gregory's grandfather's correspondence for publication as Mr Gregory's Letter-Box 1813–30 (1898). This entailed her researching Irish history of the period; one outcome of this work was a shift in her political position, from the "soft" Unionism of her earlier writing on Home Rule to a definite support of Irish nationalism and Republicanism, and to what she was later to describe as "a dislike and distrust of England".

=== Founding of the Abbey ===
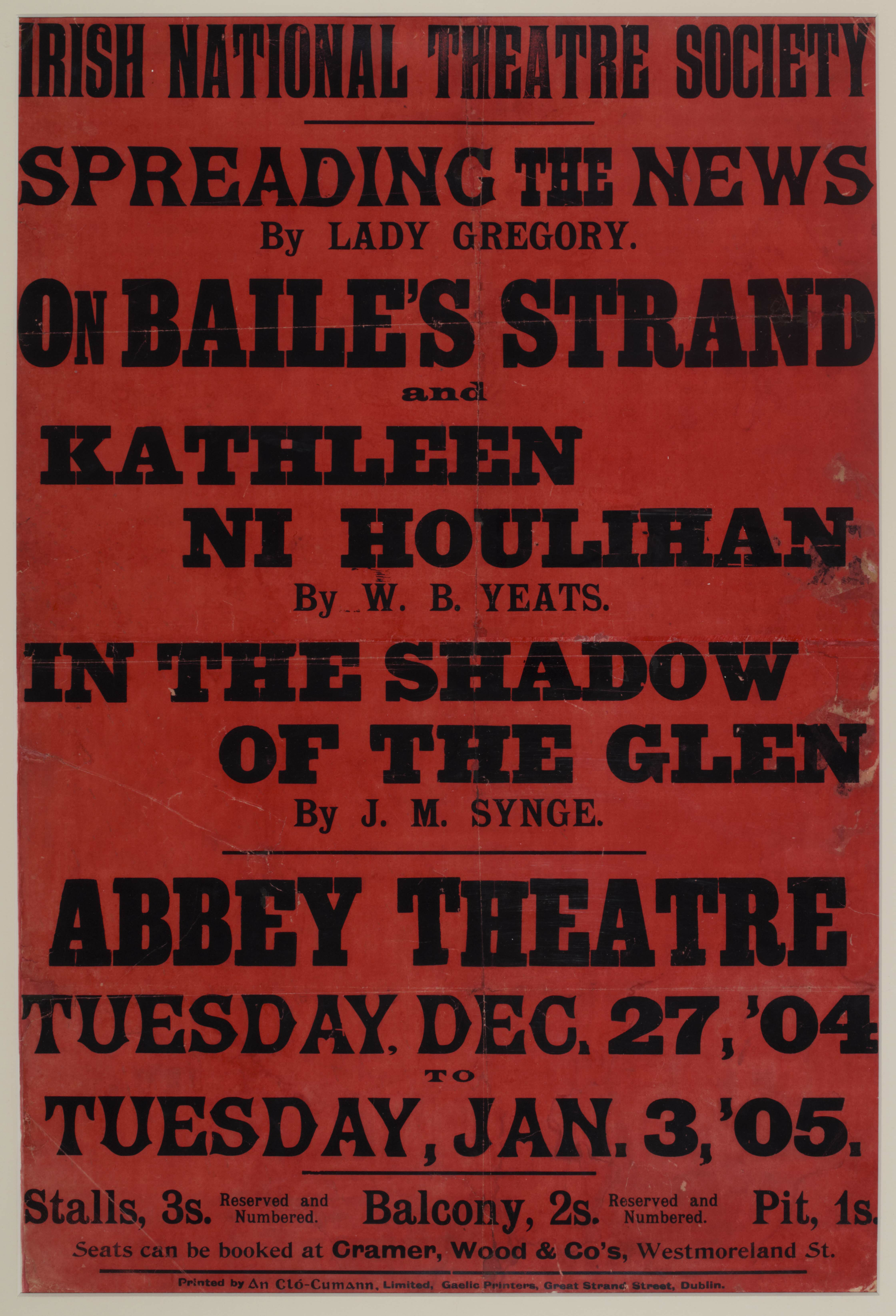
A poster for the opening run at the Abbey Theatre from 27 December 1904 to 3 January 1905

Edward Martyn was a neighbour of Lady Gregory, and it was during a visit to his home, Tullira Castle, in 1896 that she first met W. B. Yeats. Discussions between the three of them, over the following year or so, led to the founding of the Irish Literary Theatre in 1899. Lady Gregory undertook fundraising, and the first programme consisted of Martyn's The Heather Field and Yeats's The Countess Cathleen.

The Irish Literary Theatre project lasted until 1901, when it collapsed owing to lack of funding. In 1904, Lady Gregory, Martyn, Yeats, John Millington Synge, Æ, Annie Horniman and William and Frank Fay came together to form the Irish National Theatre Society. The first performances staged by the society took place in a building called the Molesworth Hall. When the Hibernian Theatre of Varieties in Lower Abbey Street and an adjacent building in Marlborough Street became available, Horniman and William Fay agreed to their purchase and refitting to meet the needs of the society.

On 11 May 1904, the society formally accepted Horniman's offer of the use of the building. As Horniman was not normally resident in Ireland, the Royal Letters Patent required were paid for by her but granted in the name of Lady Gregory. One of her own plays, Spreading the News, was performed on the opening night, 27 December 1904. At the opening of Synge's The Playboy of the Western World in January 1907, a significant portion of the crowd rioted, causing the remainder of the performances to be acted out in dumbshow. Lady Gregory did not think as highly of the play as Yeats did, but she defended Synge as a matter of principle. Her view of the affair is summed up in a letter to Yeats where she wrote of the riots: "It is the old battle, between those who use a toothbrush and those who don't."

=== Later career ===
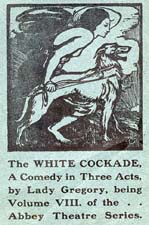
The cover of Lady Gregory's 1905 play

After the killing of Eileen Quinn by the Black and Tans in 1920, Gregory wrote six articles for The Nation to alert the British public to atrocities being committed in Ireland. In July 1925, The Travelling Man by Lady Gregory was broadcast by the nascent British Broadcasting Company's 2LO (London) station.

She remained an active director of the theatre until ill-health led to her retirement in 1928. During this time she wrote more than 19 plays, mainly for production at the Abbey. Many of these were written in an attempted transliteration of the Hiberno-English dialect spoken around Coole Park that became widely known as Kiltartanese, from the nearby village of Kiltartan. Her plays had been among the most successful at the Abbey in the earlier years, but their popularity declined. Indeed, the Irish writer Oliver St. John Gogarty once wrote "the perpetual presentation of her plays nearly ruined the Abbey". In addition to her plays, she wrote a two-volume study of the folklore of her native area called Visions and Beliefs in the West of Ireland in 1920. She also played the lead role in three performances of Cathleen Ni Houlihan in 1919.

During her time on the board of the Abbey, Coole Park remained her home; she spent her time in Dublin staying in a number of hotels. For example, at the time of the 1911 national census, she was staying in a hotel at 16 South Frederick Street. In these she dined frugally, often on food she had brought with her from home. She frequently used her hotel rooms to interview would-be Abbey dramatists and to entertain the company after opening nights of new plays. She spent many of her days working on her translations in the National Library of Ireland. She gained a reputation as being a somewhat conservative figure. For example, when Denis Johnston submitted to the Abbey his first play, Shadowdance, it was rejected by Lady Gregory and returned to the author with "The Old Lady says No" written on the title page. Johnston decided to rename the play, and The Old Lady Says 'No!' was eventually staged by the Gate Theatre in 1928.

=== Retirement and death ===
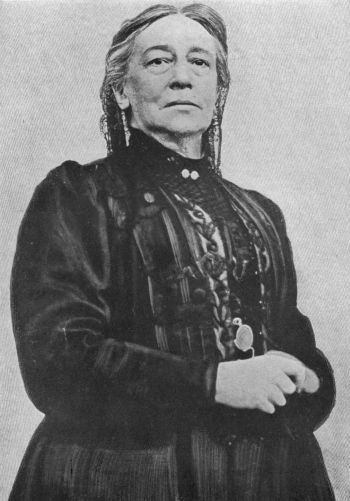
Lady Gregory in later life

When she retired from the Abbey board, Lady Gregory returned to live in Galway, although she continued to visit Dublin regularly. The house and demesne at Coole Park had been sold to the Irish Forestry Commission in 1927, with Lady Gregory retaining life tenancy. Her Galway home had long been a focal point for the writers associated with the Irish Literary Revival, and this continued after her retirement. On a tree in what were the grounds of the house, one can still see the carved initials of Synge, Æ, Yeats and his artist brother Jack, George Moore, Seán O'Casey, George Bernard Shaw, Katharine Tynan and Violet Martin. Yeats wrote five poems about, or set in, the house and grounds: "The Wild Swans at Coole", "I walked among the seven woods of Coole", "In the Seven Woods", "Coole Park, 1929" and "Coole Park and Ballylee, 1931".

In 1932, Lady Gregory, whom Shaw once described as "the greatest living Irishwoman", died at home aged 80 from breast cancer, and is buried in Bohermore Cemetery, Galway. The entire contents of Coole Park were auctioned three months after her death, and the house was demolished in 1941.

== Legacy ==
Her plays fell out of favour after her death, and are now rarely performed. Many of the diaries and journals she kept for most of her adult life have been published, providing a rich source of information on Irish literary history during the first three decades of the 20th century.

Her Cuchulain of Muirthemne is still considered a good retelling of the Ulster Cycle tales such as Deidre, Cuchulainn, and the Táin Bó Cúailnge stories. Thomas Kinsella wrote "I emerged with the conviction that Lady Gregory's Cuchul-ian of Muirthemne, though only a paraphrase, gave the best idea of the Ulster stories". However her version omitted some elements of the tale, usually assumed to avoid offending Victorian sensibilities, as well being an attempt as presenting a "respectable" nation myth for the Irish, though her paraphrase is not considered dishonest. Other critics find the bowdlerisations in her works more offensive, not only the removal of references to sex and bodily functions, but also the loss of Cuchulain's "battle frenzy" (Ríastrad); in other areas she censored less than some of her male contemporaries, such as Standish O'Grady.

In 2019, the New York Public Library announced a major exhibition on Gregory and her work, "All This Mine Alone: Lady Gregory and the Irish Literary Revival," to be co-curated by James Pethica and Colm Toíbín. The exhibition opened in March 2020 but closed due to the global pandemic; an online version remains available. In conjunction with the exhibition, The Irish Repertory Theatre of New York and the Druid Theatre of Galway offered a major revival of some of Gregory's plays. In November 2020 it was announced that Trinity College Dublin, whose library's forty busts previously represented men only was commissioning four additional busts of women and that one of them would be a bust of Lady Gregory. In 2023 Gregory was the subject of a two-part RTÉ documentary starring Miriam Margolyes and Senator Lynn Ruane, and featuring commentary from Roy Foster, James Pethica, Judith A. Hill, Melissa Sihra, and other Gregory scholars.

== Published works, collaborations and translations ==
- Arabi and His Household (1882)
- Over the River (1888)
- A Phantom's Pilgrimage, or Home Ruin (1893) (anonymously)
- Sir William Gregory, K.C.M.G., Formerly Member of Parliament and Sometime Governor of *Ceylon: An Autobiography (editor 1894)
- Mr. Gregory's Letter Box 1813–1830 (editor 1898)
- Casadh an t-súgáin; or, The Twisting of the Rope (translator 1902)
- Cuchulain of Muirthemne: The Story of the Men of the Red Branch of Ulster (Irish folk tales 1902)
- Poets and Dreamers: Studies and Translations from the Irish by Lady Gregory (1903)
- Gods and Fighting Men: The Story of the Tuatha de Danann and of the Fianna of Ireland (1904)
- Kincora: A Drama in Three Acts (1905)
- Spreading the News, The Rising of the Moon By Lady Gregory. The Poorhouse by Lady Gregory and Douglas Hyde (1906)
- The Hyacinth Galvey: A Comedy (1906)
- A Book of Saints and Wonders, Put Down Here by Lady Gregory According to the Old Writings and the Memory of the People of Ireland (1907)
- Seven Short Plays: Spreading the News. Hyacinth Halvey. The Rising of the Moon. The Jackdaw. The Workhouse Ward. The Travelling Man. The Gaol Gate (1909)
- The Kiltartan History Book (1909)
- The Kiltartan Molière: The Miser. The Doctor in Spite of Himself. The Rogueries of Scapin. Translated by Lady Gregory (1910)
- Spreading the News (1911)
- The Kiltartan Wonder Book by Lady Gregory (1911)
- Irish Folk-History Plays, 1st series. The Tragedies: Grania – Kincora—Dervorgilla (1912)
- Irish Folk-History Plays, 2nd series: The Tragic-Comedies: The Canavans – The White Cockade – The Deliverer (1912)
- New Comedies: The Bogie Men; The Full Moon; Coats; Damer's Gold; McDonough's Wife (1913)
- Damer's Gold: A Comedy in Two Acts (1913)
- Coats (1913)
- Our Irish Theatre – A Chapter of Autobiography (1913)
- The Unicorn from the Stars: And Other Plays, by W.B. Yeats and Lady Gregory (1915)
- Shanwalla (1915)
- The Golden Apple: A Play for Kiltartan Children (1916)
- The Kiltartan Poetry Book: Prose Translations from the Irish (1919)
- The Dragon: A Wonder Play in Three Acts (1920)
- Visions and Beliefs in the West of Ireland Collected and Arranged by Lady Gregory: With Two Essays and Notes by W.B. Yeats (1920)
- Hugh Lane's Life and Achievement, with Some Account of the Dublin Galleries. With Illustrations (1921)
- The Image and Other Plays (Hanranhan's Ghost; Shanwalla; The Wrens(1922)
- Three Wonder Plays: The Dragon. Aristotle's Bellows. The Jester (1922)
- Plays in Prose and Verse: Written for an Irish Theatre, and Generally with the Help of a Friend, by W. B. Yeats and Lady Gregory (1922)
- The Story Brought by Brigit (1924)
- Mirandolina (1924)
- On the Racecourse (1926)
- Three Last Plays: Sancho's Master. Dave. The Would-Be Gentleman (1928)
- My First Play (Colman and Guair) (1930)
- Coole (1931)
- Lady Gregory's Journals (1947)
- Seventy Years, 1852-1922, Being the Autobiography of Lady Gregory (1974)
- The Journals. Part 1. 10 October 1916 – 24 February 1925 (1978)
- The Journals. Part 2. 21 February 1925 – 9 May 1932 (1987)
- Lady Gregory's Diaries 1892-1902 (1996)
- Lady Gregory's Early Irish Writings 1883-1893 (2018)

== See also ==
- Cathleen ni Houlihan
- List of Irish dramatists
