= The Bridesmaid (film) =

- Theatrical release poster
- Directed by: Claude Chabrol
- Screenplay by: Claude Chabrol; Pierre Leccia
- Based on: The Bridesmaid by Ruth Rendell
- Produced by: Patrick Godeau; Antonio Passalia; Alfred Hürmer
- Starring: Benoît Magimel; Laura Smet
- Cinematography: Eduardo Serra
- Edited by: Monique Fardoulis
- Music by: Matthieu Chabrol
- Production companies: Alicéléo; Canal Diffusion; France 2 Cinéma; Integral Film
- Distributed by: BAC Films
- Release dates: 7 September 2004 (Venice); 17 November 2004 (France)
- Running time: 111 minutes
- Countries: France; Germany
- Language: French
- Box office: $3.3 million

The Bridesmaid is a 2004 psychological thriller film co-written and directed by Claude Chabrol. Its title in French is La Demoiselle d'honneur. The film is based on the 1989 novel The Bridesmaid by Ruth Rendell.

== Plot ==
Philippe (Magimel) lives on the outskirts of Nantes with his mother Christine (Clément) who is a hairdresser and with his two younger sisters. One day, a local girl mysteriously disappears. Soon after, Philippe's mother introduces her children to Gerard (Le Coq) -- a wealthy local businessman who appears interested in pursuing her. She gives him a sculpture of the Roman goddess Flora that had been in the family garden.

Not too long after receiving the gift, Gerard appears to vanish without a trace, presumably in order to avoid contact with Christine. Philippe makes it his mission to recover the sculpture. He finally tracks it down and places it in his closet without telling anyone. Later, at his sister's wedding, Philippe meets attractive bridesmaid Senta (Smet) and the two quickly fall for each other passionately. She claims to be a model and aspiring actress who lives in a huge villa which she says she inherited from her father. The sexy Senta may be beautiful and irresistible, yet she also invents stories about herself and has macabre ideas about life, love, and death. As their affair intensifies, she asks Philippe to kill a stranger to prove his love. When he refuses, she kicks him out of her house, telling him he doesn't really love her. Philippe presents a news article about a dead tramp as proof that he has done the deed, and Senta, in return, tells him that she has killed Gerard. Philippe, not wanting to believe that she has really done it, goes to Gerard's house and finds that he is still alive. Relieved that Senta is not a murderer, he gives her the sculpture of Flora and asks her to marry him. A police inspector informs Philippe that another man was killed at the same location, and asks Philippe to explain his presence there. When he is released from the police station, Philippe calls Senta and tells her that they should break up. He then meets the homeless man whom he had claimed to have murdered, but whose reported death was a case of mistaken identity.

Philippe returns to Senta's house, and she confesses to him that she has killed a young woman who wanted to steal her previous boyfriend. As the police arrive, Philippe tells Senta that he will never leave her.

== Cast ==
- Benoît Magimel as Philippe Tardieu
- Laura Smet as Stéphanie "Senta" Bellange
- Aurore Clément as Christine
- Bernard Le Coq as Gérard Courtois
- Michel Duchaussoy as Vagrant
- Suzanne Flon as Madame Crespin
- Solène Bouton as Sophie Tardieu
- Anna Mihalcea as Patricia Tardieu
- Éric Seigne as Jacky
- Philippe Duclos as Captain
- Thomas Chabrol as Lieutenant José Laval
- Pierre-François Dumeniaud as Nadeau

== Production ==
Filming took place in Nantes, Rezé and Pornic. The film was also partially shot in Munich.

== Release ==
The Bridesmaid premiered out of competition at the 61st Venice International Film Festival. It was distributed in France on 17 November 2004 by BAC Films.

== Critical reception ==
On the review aggregator website Rotten Tomatoes, the film holds an approval rating of 93% based on 55 reviews, with an average rating of 7.2/10. The website's critics consensus reads, "Chabrol has crafted another sophisticated, unsettling thriller about sinister doings among the bourgeoisie." Metacritic, which uses a weighted average, assigned the film a score of 74 out of 100, based on 20 critics, indicating "generally favorable" reviews.

Desson Thomas of The Washington Post:

Chabrol arranges his story with a subtle, almost clinical accumulation. And it takes close attention to the movie's seemingly innocuous details to understand his deeper purposes. But the filmmaker has never been as interested in the machinations of plot as much as aberrant human nature... its rewards come from sustained concentration rather than from relaxed observation.

Ty Burr of The Boston Globe:

The film reveals its secrets slowly, and Chabrol tightens the screws not according to the rules of Hollywood suspense but with a cool, level gaze. Of the great filmmakers of the French New Wave, he may have changed the least over the years, and there's a continuity of tone and morbid inquiry that runs from Le Boucher (1970) through La Ceremonie (1995, and also based on Rendell) to The Bridesmaid. Comparisons to Hitchcock have been made throughout his career, but they serve to define differences more than similarities. Hitch made movie suspense showy and fun. Chabrol grounds it in realism and ponders the hazy line where eccentricity turns homicidal.
