= The Bridesmaid (novel) =

1989 novel by Ruth Rendell

- First edition cover (UK)
- Author: Ruth Rendell
- Language: English
- Genre: Crime/Mystery novel
- Publisher: Hutchinson (UK); Mysterious Press (US); Doubleday Canada (Canada)
- Publication date: 6 April 1989
- Publication place: United Kingdom
- Media type: Print (Hardback & Paperback)
- Pages: 304 pp
- ISBN: 0-09-173854-7
- OCLC: 59049472

The Bridesmaid is a novel by British writer Ruth Rendell, published in 1989. It is generally considered a fan-favourite, and was adapted into an acclaimed 2004 film by Claude Chabrol (who had previous adapted Rendell's earlier novel A Judgement in Stone, with great success).
