= Jackie Clune =

British actress and writer

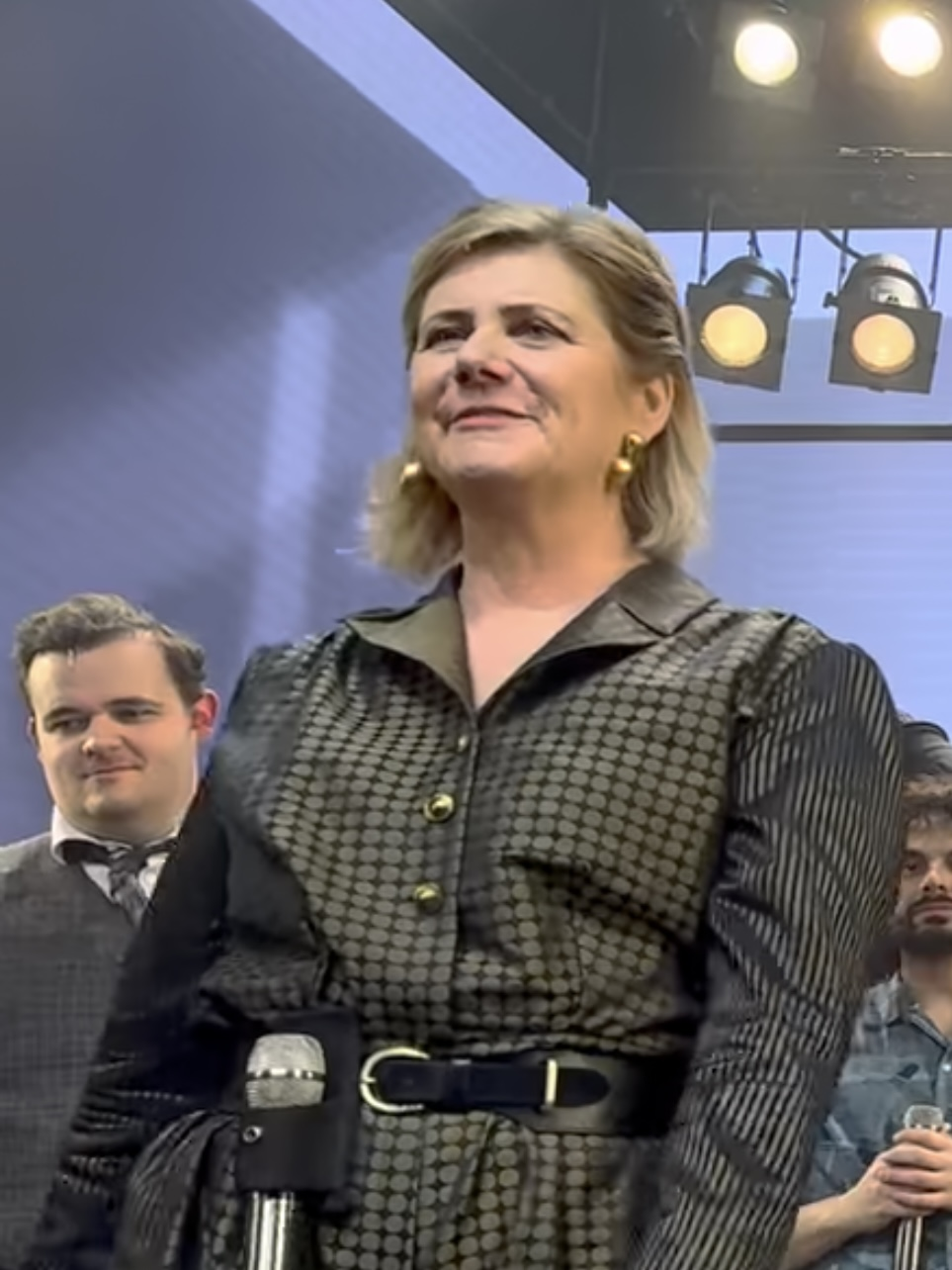
- Clune performing in 2024
- Born: Jacqueline Clune; 13 December 1965 (age 60); Harlow, Essex, England
- Occupations: Drama lecturer, singer, comedian, actress, television presenter
- Years active: 1986–present
- Spouse: Richard Hannant (2008–present)

Jacqueline Clune (born 13 December 1965) is a British actress and writer. She became established through her Edinburgh Fringe one-woman cabaret shows and her 1995 Karen Carpenter tribute act before graduating to mainstream acting.

== Early life ==
Jackie Clune is the third of four children born in Harlow, Essex, to Irish Roman Catholic parents: her father, Don Clune (died August 2010), worked for a computer firm, her mother, (died 2018) was a nurse. The writer Maggie Clune is her sister.

Jackie Clune graduated with a degree in drama from the University of Kent.

== Career ==
On graduation from university, she became a full-time drama lecturer at the Royal Holloway College for at least six years, was the presenter of the Weekend Breakfast Show on BBC GLR 94.9fm, and a BBC London radio journalist. She started singing in bands part-time, but between sets as a DJ she developed a facility in chatting to the audience. This led a friend to suggest that she could create a Karen Carpenter tribute performance, with singing; this she worked on and took to the Edinburgh Festival in 1995, where she was spotted by a West End producer.

Giving up her lecturing career, she co-founded the Red Rag Women's Theatre Company, and fell into stand-up comedy while working at the Hackney Empire. Her credits include the BBC soap drama EastEnders and ITV's The Bill. Since hosting the Stonewall Society equality shows at the Royal Albert Hall, she has developed a multi-media career. She has been on TV (terrestrial and Sky) and a radio panellist on Front Row, QI, Never Mind the Buzzcocks, What the Dickens?, Woman's Hour and The Staying-in Show and Loose Women.

She had a part in Showstopper (1997), Bryony Lavery's play A Wedding Story (1999) and portrayed Julie Burchill, at the time a columnist for The Guardian, in the one-woman play Julie Burchill Is Away by Tim Fountain at the Edinburgh Festival Fringe and in the West End (2003) which launched her to the global press. In 2006–7, she played the lead female role of Donna in the Abba songs-based musical Mamma Mia! international tour until 17 March 2007. On 4 June 2007, she took over the role of the dance teacher Mrs. Wilkinson in Billy Elliot the Musical in London. She gave her final performance on 22 November 2008 prior to rejoining the Mamma Mia! International Tour (2009–2011) again as leading role Donna, the role interpreted by Meryl Streep in the film.

She sang the theme tune of, and contributed material to, the TV comedy Smack the Pony. After becoming involved in the revival of the Andrew Lloyd Webber and Don Black musical Tell Me On A Sunday, she met Denise van Outen with whom she co-wrote the show Blondes, which van Outen performed at the Edinburgh Festival Fringe in August 2009 and in six preview performances at the New End Theatre in Hampstead.

She promoted the album Love Songs (Dress Circle) courtesy of a show at the Soho Theatre in London's West End from 15 to 17 July 2010 and has also been involved in several musical projects including the 2010 memorial concert for the late Kirsty MacColl, singing with Billy Bragg.

Clune has also published two books, Man of the Month Club and Extreme Motherhood, diaries relating how her lifestyle changed when she found herself pregnant with triplets little more than a year after having her first child. She is also a freelance journalist. She contributed a column to the monthly magazine Top Santé magazine in 2013–14. Further books were released in July 2020 and June 2021.

She performed in 2011 as the outspoken Miss Ogle in the play The Belle's Stratagem, directed by Jessica Swale and a revival of a script by Hannah Cowley from the Georgian period, at the Southwark Playhouse. She has been a warm-up act for the Singalonga Sound of Music and the Puppetry of the Penis shows.

In 2012, she toured nationally in the leading role of Amanda, the troubled teacher, in the cast of a play about bullying and racism issues for teachers, Mogadishu (14+) which received a nomination for the Olivier Awards 2012.

From October 2012 until 24 August 2013, Clune played the role of Violet in the ATG national tour of 9 to 5: The Musical, launched at the Manchester Opera House.

In 2013–14, she had a role in the musical/operetta Candide.

Clune played Glendower and Westmorland in Phyllida Lloyd's new all-female stage production (world premiere) starring Dame Harriet Walter at the Donmar Warehouse of Henry IV (Parts I and II combined, in October–November 2014) which went to St Ann's Warehouse in NY (USA) until 13 December 2015.

Clune played Maggie Tan in The Vote (Donmar Warehouse/More 4) in summer 2015, and then had a leading role at the Salisbury Playhouse in Noël Coward's Fallen Angels, a musical period drama, before joining the ensemble in the female-only Henry IV as above. She has been in the cast of the Kings Cross Shakespeare trilogy (Tonic Awards 2017). She has also had a role in the film Denial (director Mick Johnson), 2016, and the acclaimed BBC TV drama Three girls (cast as Jillian Menzies) which won a Royal Television Society award in 2018.

In 2016-17, Clune co-starred in Borderline as boss Linda Proctor on Channel 5.

Clune appeared in three BBC television series, Motherland (BAFTA 2022), Ghosts and Mandy.

She is part of the performance arts creative writing team for Queers.

She was in the cast of the American play Utility at the Orange Tree Theatre in Richmond, London.

She was cast in the role of Pompey in Measure for Measure for the autumn billing at the Donmar.

She appeared in the cast of the Olivier Award-thrice-winning Emilia (a play about Emilia Bassano) in the West End (2019), in The Vote, and in 9 to 5 again in 2020.

She has had billing as the Narrator for The Rocky Horror Show, and a character part in Just for One Day. in 2025, she features in the cast of a new BBC TV series, based on an Agatha Christie novel, "Towards Zero". Also touring Julius Caesar.

== Personal life ==
Clune was heterosexual, but at age 22 began dating women exclusively. Several of her relationships were long-term. After her last female relationship, she rejected an either/or choice and came out bisexual. In 2001, Clune met Heartbeat actor and stunt performer Richard Hannant, who was the fire officer at the Arts Theatre where she was performing, and started a relationship with him. Eleven months later she became pregnant with their first child, a daughter, Saoirse. The couple went on to have triplets (2005), and married in 2008.

For some years after her marriage, Clune referred to herself as a "hasbian" (former lesbian), but as of 2025 described herself as queer.

Clune has been on the general council of the Equity Committee since 2013 and in August 2020 was elected vice president. and again in 2026 is an Equity Vice President.
