= List of Peaky Blinders episodes =

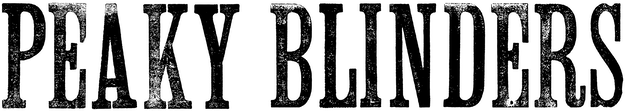

Peaky Blinders is a British period crime drama television series created by Steven Knight. Set in Birmingham, England, it follows the exploits of the Peaky Blinders crime gang in the direct aftermath of the First World War and throughout the 1920s and 1930s. The fictional gang is loosely based on a real urban youth gang of the same name who were active in the city from the 1910s. It premiered on 12 September 2013, telecast on BBC Two until the fourth series, then moved to BBC One for the fifth and sixth series.

On 18 January 2021, it was announced that the sixth series would be the final of the show. During the course of the programme, 36 episodes of Peaky Blinders aired over six series, between 12 September 2013 and 3 April 2022.

== Series overview ==
| Series | Episodes | Originally released | | | Average UK viewers (millions) |
| Series | Episodes | First released | Last released | Network | Average UK viewers (millions) |
|---|---|---|---|---|---|
| 1 | 6 | 12 September 2013 | 17 October 2013 | BBC Two | 2.38 |
| 2 | 6 | 2 October 2014 | 6 November 2014 | BBC Two | 2.18 |
| 3 | 6 | 5 May 2016 | 9 June 2016 | BBC Two | 2.38 |
| 4 | 6 | 15 November 2017 | 20 December 2017 | BBC Two | 3.35 |
| 5 | 6 | 25 August 2019 | 22 September 2019 | BBC One | 5.87 |
| 6 | 6 | 27 February 2022 | 3 April 2022 | BBC One | 5.42 |

== Episodes ==
=== Series 1 (2013) ===
| No. overall | No. in series | Episode | Directed by | Written by | Original release date | UK viewers (millions) |
|---|---|---|---|---|---|---|
| 1 | 1 | Episode 1 | Otto Bathurst | Steven Knight | 12 September 2013 | 3.05 |
In 1919 following the Great War, the Peaky Blinders, led by Thomas "Tommy" Shelby, a decorated former sergeant major, appropriates a consignment of guns from the local arms factory. Winston Churchill sends Chief Inspector Chester Campbell of the Royal Irish Constabulary to Birmingham to retrieve guns headed for Libya, thought to have been stolen by the Peaky Blinders. Tommy's aunt Polly Gray urges Tommy to return the guns, but he feels that he can use them to his advantage. His brother Arthur Shelby does not agree with Tommy about fixing horse races, believing it will cause trouble with Billy Kimber, who runs the races. Inspector Campbell and his men capture Arthur and beat him while inquiring about the gun robbery. Inspector Campbell propositions Arthur and the gang to work with him to find the guns. Tommy's sister Ada Shelby is involved with Freddie Thorne, a communist. A barmaid named Grace Burgess starts working at the Garrison, a bar owned by the Peaky Blinders. She has been placed in Birmingham by Inspector Campbell to help find the guns. Tommy's friend Danny has a PTSD episode and kills an Italian business owner. To avoid a war with the Italians, Tommy agrees to kill Danny, with the Italians witnessing. However, Danny's death is faked and he goes to London on a special assignment.
| 2 | 2 | Episode 2 | Otto Bathurst | Steven Knight | 19 September 2013 | 2.45 |
Tommy, Arthur and their brother John Shelby meet with a rival Romanichal gang, the Lees, to look at a horse for the next race. The Lees insult the Peaky Blinders and a fight breaks out. Inspector Campbell's special force launches a surprise crackdown, targeting communists and looking for the guns. Freddie and Ada escape, but Freddie has to leave town. Inspector Campbell confronts Polly and attacks all the Peaky Blinder establishments. In retaliation, Tommy arranges for a reporter to write about a burning of the King's picture, which prompts Churchill to pressure Inspector Campbell. Tommy meets with Inspector Campbell and gives him an ultimatum: if the Peaky Blinders are left alone, he will return the guns; if Inspector Campbell interferes with his plans, Tommy will send the guns to the IRA and ruin Inspector Campbell's work in Belfast. Inspector Campbell agrees but instructs Grace to get close to Tommy and find the location of the guns. Polly realises Ada is pregnant and tells Tommy, who threatens to kill Freddie but then instructs him to take Ada away. Freddie instead proposes to Ada and decides to stay in town. Billy Kimber and his men confront the Peaky Blinders, but Tommy convinces them to join forces in fighting the Lees.
| 3 | 3 | Episode 3 | Otto Bathurst | Steven Knight | 26 September 2013 | 2.20 |
Ada and Freddie marry; Polly gives them money to leave the country. Despite Tommy's best efforts to keep the guns a secret, people keep finding out about them, including two IRA members. Grace overhears them trying to blackmail Tommy and follows one of them, but he attacks her. Grace manages to shoot her attacker dead in self-defence. Tommy warns Billy Kimber that the Lees will once again rob Billy Kimber's bookies at the races. Tommy brings Grace as his date to Cheltenham races in an attempt to distract Billy Kimber as well as convince him that he should hire the Peaky Blinders as his security. Billy Kimber agrees if he can have some time alone with Grace, to which Tommy agrees. At the last minute, he has a change of heart and claims that Grace is actually a prostitute with syphilis. Freddie decides Tommy is not going to scare him off and returns.
| 4 | 4 | Episode 4 | Tom Harper | Steven Knight and Stephen Russell | 3 October 2013 | 2.31 |
Tommy makes his business legitimate by obtaining a betting license. Although he does not quite trust her and is suspicious of her, Tommy hires Grace as his secretary. John calls the gang together to tell them he wants to marry Lizzie Stark, a local prostitute. Tommy disapproves because he does not think Lizzie has given up her former profession. His suspicions are confirmed when he requests her services as a test and she agrees. The Lees rob the Peaky Blinders' gambling den as revenge for the Peaky Blinders having protected Billy Kimber's bookies at the races. Tommy decides to call a truce with the Lees so that he can have an ally against Billy Kimber and marries John to the Lees' daughter Esme to secure the agreement. Ada comes to the wedding but goes into labour soon after. Freddie comes to see the new baby but is arrested when he shows up.
| 5 | 5 | Episode 5 | Tom Harper | Steven Knight and Toby Finlay | 10 October 2013 | 2.03 |
Believing Tommy betrayed Freddie, Ada does not want to see or speak to the Shelby family. Arthur Shelby Sr. (Tommy Flanagan), who deserted the Shelby family a decade ago, comes back into town. Tommy wants nothing to do with him, but Arthur believes he has changed. He gives Arthur Sr. a large sum of money to build hotels in the United States, only for Arthur Sr. to abscond with it. An IRA member starts inquiring about the man Grace killed. Tommy and Grace kill the other IRA members. Now in love with Tommy, Grace tells Inspector Campbell that if she tells him where the guns are, he must leave Tommy and the Shelby family alone. She suspects the guns are buried in a false grave after discovering that Danny is not really dead. Grace gives up the location to Inspector Campbell and resigns service to the Crown. Inspector Campbell proposes marriage, which Grace rejects. Tommy and Grace consummate their connection, secretly witnessed by Inspector Campbell. Arthur attempts suicide by hanging himself, but survives when the rope snaps off its hook.
| 6 | 6 | Episode 6 | Tom Harper | Steven Knight | 17 October 2013 | 2.24 |
Inspector Campbell confirms to Churchill that Grace should be commended for her part in finding the missing guns. Polly meets with Grace to reveal she knows Grace's secret and that she will never forgive her. The Peaky Blinders, led by Danny, spring Freddie from prison. Tommy gathers the Peaky Blinders and the Lees to take on Billy Kimber's men at the tracks, but Billy Kimber catches the Peaky Blinders off guard and outnumbered by confronting them at home. Freddie helps the Peaky Blinders by bringing out a machine gun from the stolen weapons, but Ada jumps into the middle of the standoff trying to bring peace. Billy Kimber opens fire on the Peaky Blinders, killing Danny and injuring Tommy. Tommy, in turn, shoots Billy Kimber dead. Tommy meets Grace and she tells him she loves him and will go to London for a few days; she has an idea of how they can be together. Tommy writes a letter and flips a coin to decide if he will go with Grace. As this happens, Inspector Campbell confronts Grace at the railway station and points his pistol at her. As the scene fades, there is a gunshot.

=== Series 2 (2014) ===
| No. overall | No. in series | Episode | Directed by | Written by | Original release date | UK viewers (millions) |
|---|---|---|---|---|---|---|
| 7 | 1 | Episode 1 | Colm McCarthy | Steven Knight | 2 October 2014 | 2.31 |
Grace shoots Inspector Campbell and leaves. Two years later, the Garrison is blown up while the Peaky Blinders are attending Freddie’s funeral. Tommy asks Ada to come home as he is planning an expansion into London. Tommy goes to the Black Lion to confront those responsible for the explosion. Instead, he is taken to meet with the IRA and asked to assassinate someone, which he does. Tommy is informed that Inspector Campbell, now a Major of the British Secret Intelligence Service, is returning to Birmingham. The Peaky Blinders have a meeting regarding the expansion of the bookie business, during which Polly and Esme have reservations. Nonetheless, Tommy, Arthur and John decide to get familiar with the London scene and end up causing a rumpus at Darby Sabini's club. Polly visits a medium for information on her children that were taken from her. Tommy hires Lizzie as his secretary. In retaliation for the club incident, Sabini has his thugs kidnap and attempt to rape Ada, as well as beat Tommy to within an inch of his life. Campbell intervenes before Sabini and his men can finish him off, having agreed with Churchill that Tommy will be useful to them.
| 8 | 2 | Episode 2 | Colm McCarthy | Steven Knight | 9 October 2014 | 2.18 |
Campbell visits Tommy in the hospital and reveals that he knows about the murder Tommy committed for the IRA, and has had Tommy under surveillance for some time. Tommy discharges himself early and takes a barge down to London. He meets with the vicious Jewish gang-leader Alfie Solomons in Camden Town. Tommy has a hard time convincing Alfie that he should align with the Peaky Blinders against Sabini. Tommy buys Polly and Ada houses as a means of laundering money. Esme has told Tommy about Polly trying to find her children. Tommy tells Polly her daughter is dead, but he has managed to track down her son Michael. Unfortunately, due to the law, Polly is unable to see Michael until he is 18 years of age. Arthur's flashbacks from the war are getting worse, and during one, he kills a boy while sparring. He starts using cocaine to self-medicate. Following the reopening of the Garrison, Michael shows up on Polly’s doorstep.
| 9 | 3 | Episode 3 | Colm McCarthy | Steven Knight | 16 October 2014 | 2.20 |
The gang hires the Digbeth Kid, a neighbourhood boy who loves cowboy movies, to get stood up for gambling to help the local police meet their arrest quota. While in prison, Sabini's thugs murder the Digbeth Kid to get back at the Peaky Blinders for their intrusion on his turf. Polly and Michael try to get to know each other. Tommy and John meet with Billy Kitchen, of the Black Country Boys, who fought with them in the war. Tommy tells Kitchen to round up his men for them to go to work in Camden Town for Alfie. Arthur is threatened by the mother of the boy he killed. Tommy tells Campbell that the officers played a joke on him and have boarded him in a house that is owned by a not-so-former Madam. The Peaky Blinders and Michael go to an auction to purchase a horse and meet horse trainer May Carleton. On the way home, they are ambushed by Sabini's right-hand man, who tries to shoot Tommy, but is stopped when Arthur intervenes and beats him severely.
| 10 | 4 | Episode 4 | Colm McCarthy | Steven Knight | 23 October 2014 | 2.06 |
Tommy meets with his Irish handlers and discovers they are backed by Campbell and the Crown. They order another hit, but Tommy turns them down. Arthur and the gang attack one of Sabini's clubs. Michael requests that Tommy give him a job. Tommy hires May to train his horse. Tommy wants to export whisky to the United States and Canada – both of which are currently under prohibition. Arthur's cocaine habit is starting to spiral out of control and Tommy tells him to straighten up. Tommy visits Ada and tells her he has set up a trust fund for John's children and her son Karl. Alfie and Sabini meet and settle their differences. As Michael and his black friend Isaiah Jesus try to drink in a bar, they get into an argument with a racist patron. When Arthur and John learn that the Shelby name was disrespected, they burn the bar. Tommy calls Grace in London but hangs up without saying anything when a man answers.
| 11 | 5 | Episode 5 | Colm McCarthy | Steven Knight | 30 October 2014 | 2.10 |
Alfie hosts a Passover Seder and invites an unaware Arthur and some of his men, who are soon slaughtered, and has Arthur sent to prison. Campbell has Michael arrested as well. Sabini and the now gruesomely scarred Mario take back control of the Eden Club. Tommy finds his fledgeling empire crumbling before him, as his power-base in London is obliterated. Tommy struggles to save his family and regain the upper hand, as the tentative Black Country/Brum alliance is in tatters after Billy Kitchen's untimely death. Tommy further complicates his love life, by escorting the returning Grace to a passionate date, though still stringing May along, who had earlier expressed her feelings for him. Having slept with Tommy, Grace admits being in London with her husband to procure fertility treatment. Campbell forces Polly to have sex with him in exchange for Michael's freedom. Tommy attempts to end his romantic relationship with May, though he still wants her to continue training his horse.
| 12 | 6 | Episode 6 | Colm McCarthy | Steven Knight | 6 November 2014 | 2.24 |
Tommy decides to settle all his affairs in case he meets an untimely death. He also meets with Alfie regarding business contracts. Alfie gets Arthur out of prison. Derby Day has arrived. Polly tries to pay off Michael to get him to leave. Tommy collects the Peaky Blinders and gives them their mission at the races. Without firing a shot, they are to collect and burn the licences of Sabini's bookies and steal the bets. Tommy runs into Grace, who informs him that she's pregnant with his child. Lizzie lures Field Marshal Russell to the horse stables so Tommy can kill him for Campbell, but Tommy gets there late, and Lizzie is brutally assaulted by Russell before Tommy can kill him. Campbell's men from Northern Ireland, three members of the Ulster Volunteers, kidnap Tommy and take him to an empty field while Polly meets with Campbell and shoots him dead. Instead of Tommy being executed, one of the Ulster Volunteers kills the other two, and tells Tommy that Winston Churchill will be contacting him in the future. Michael decides he wants in on the family business. Tommy tells Michael that he plans on getting married in the future.

=== Series 3 (2016) ===
| No. overall | No. in series | Episode | Directed by | Written by | Original release date | UK viewers (millions) |
|---|---|---|---|---|---|---|
| 13 | 1 | Episode 1 | Tim Mielants | Steven Knight | 5 May 2016 | 2.95 |
Two years later, in 1924, Tommy and Grace get married. The Peaky Blinders and their kin have been invited, as well as Grace's family. Composed of cavalrymen, Irish members of the British Army, Grace's family dismays the Peaky Blinders, due to the cavalry's late arrival on the battlefield during the war. The Peaky Blinders have a meeting in the kitchen, where Tommy, in a state of stress, orders the men to be on their best behaviour. Meanwhile, a refugee from Soviet Russia, named Anton Kaledin, makes contact with the Peaky Blinders, offering the code "Constantine" as confirmation for the money-exchange meeting with the young Grand Duchess Tatiana Petrovna. Tommy informs her that Kaledin provided the wrong code name, meaning the man must be killed. Arthur confides in Tommy, not wanting to do the job they must carry out, but Tommy tells him they have no choice, or else Tommy will hang. In the end, Arthur kills the impostor.
| 14 | 2 | Episode 2 | Tim Mielants | Steven Knight | 12 May 2016 | 2.43 |
Tommy inspects armoured vehicles for a business deal with Father John Hughes. He meets with Mr. Romanov, who pays him with a sapphire for murdering Kaledin. Vicente Changretta meets with Arthur and John to demand an explanation for his son Angel's restaurant burning down. John threatens Vicente and later beats Angel when Vicente publicly vows to murder him. During a gang meeting, Tommy sides with John. Later, he is taken by Scotland Yard to a prison cell, where he is greeted by Father Hughes. Father Hughes threatens to kill Ada if Tommy visits her again due to her communist connections and remarks that he has easy access to Tommy's family. Tommy later finds a card under Charles's pillow, which reads "Charles Shelby - R.I.P." Grace wears Romanov's sapphire to the Shelby Charity Foundation dinner. Father Hughes and Patrick Jarvis inform Tommy that the Russians want to inspect the vehicles. Suddenly, a guest shouts "For Angel!" and shoots Grace in the upper chest. Arthur, John and their younger brother Finn Shelby beat the man to death as Tommy shouts for an ambulance.
| 15 | 3 | Episode 3 | Tim Mielants | Steven Knight | 19 May 2016 | 2.20 |
Following Grace's funeral, Tommy meets with Polly and Michael to give them a list of things to do for their "legitimate" business. Afterwards, he orders Arthur and John to retrieve Vicente alive and shoot Vicente's wife, their former teacher, but they are reluctant to murder her. During a meeting, the Peaky Blinders realise that Tommy has left, leaving a note that he will be gone a few days. Tommy travels to Wales with the sapphire necklace, where he confers with a gypsy, whom he asks whether it is cursed. He returns home with some sense of normality having left the necklace with the woman. Arthur and John have procured Vicente, who Tommy threatens to torture, but Arthur shoots him in the head as an act of mercy. Following her help in finding the Soviet informant in the Economic League, Tommy invites Ada to head the Shelby future office in the United States. He then interrupts a meal hosted by Tatiana's aunt, the Grand Duchess Izabella Petrovna, to secretly alert her to the information he has acquired about Hughes. Tatiana sees Tommy to his car; he tells her that Father Hughes is betraying them to the Soviets and offers to kill him for free.
| 16 | 4 | Episode 4 | Tim Mielants | Steven Knight | 26 May 2016 | 2.19 |
On Easter 1924, Tommy receives news that Arthur Sr. has died and Tommy announces the plan to the Peaky Blinders: they have been hired to provide the Russians with weapons stolen from a train for a rebellion. They will be paid in jewels but, believing the Russians will betray him, Tommy plans to break into their vault. Arthur's wife Linda Shelby tells Arthur she is pregnant and wants him out of the business, which he agrees to do after the job with the Russians is over. His vagueness irritates Linda, who demands a bigger cut for Arthur so they can move to the United States together. Polly goes to church while drunk, and during confession, she reveals Tommy's plan to assassinate Father Hughes to the priest, who in turn notifies Father Hughes. Father Hughes foils Tommy's attempt on his life and watches him being seriously injured by his guards. He humiliates Tommy by threatening to kidnap Charles and makes Tommy apologise for wrongfully accusing him in front of Tatiana and her family at the Ritz. Tommy meets with a representative from the Soviet embassy and tells him that Father Hughes is double-crossing the Soviets. He then collapses from his injuries.
| 17 | 5 | Episode 5 | Tim Mielants | Steven Knight | 2 June 2016 | 2.24 |
Three months later, Tommy has recovered and the planned massive heist involving the Russians is drawing near. Tommy enlists Alfie to appraise the Russians' jewels, ruining their plan to give Tommy fakes. The Peaky Blinders begin to tunnel underneath their mansion. Tommy makes a deal with the Soviet Communists to ensure the guns on the train will be useless, which would negate their need to blow up the train (carrying the weapons to help the Russian monarchs). This would sabotage Hughes' plan which was to plant evidence at the scene of the explosion, incriminating the USSR Communists and causing the United Kingdom to cut off diplomatic relations with Russia. Ada officially joins the family business when she is offered a place in their new Boston office. Polly finally views her portrait, after which her lover Ruben Oliver and she take their relationship to the next level. After previously revealing that he was abused by Father Hughes, Michael reveals that he too wishes to kill the priest, but Polly tells Tommy that she will bring the business to its knees should Michael be the murderer.
| 18 | 6 | Episode 6 | Tim Mielants | Steven Knight | 9 June 2016 | 2.27 |
Charles is kidnapped. Father Hughes demands that Tommy himself blow up the train and for the jewels as ransom, in exchange for Charles's safe return. Tommy agrees unconditionally. After some investigation, he discovers that Alfie divulged the plans to Father Hughes. During a confrontation, Michael kills Alfie's associate but talks Tommy out of killing Alfie. After deducing Charles's whereabouts, Tommy sends Michael to retrieve Charles and kill Father Hughes. At the same time, Arthur and John set off to bomb the train in case Michael cannot rescue Charles in time. Even though Michael is successful, word does not reach the Peaky Blinders in time and the train is blown up. Meanwhile, Tommy frantically completes the tunnel and blasts into the Russian's vault, stealing many jewels. With Charles safe, he meets with Tatiana who has been in on the jewel heist the whole time and plans on taking her share to Vienna. Tommy returns home to distribute the remaining loot to his accomplices, but at the end of the meeting he announces that the police have come to arrest everyone. The rest of the Peaky Blinders are taken away in handcuffs.

=== Series 4 (2017) ===
| No. overall | No. in series | Title | Directed by | Written by | Original release date | UK viewers (millions) |
|---|---|---|---|---|---|---|
| 19 | 1 | "The Noose" | David Caffrey | Steven Knight | 15 November 2017 | 3.44 |
As Arthur, John, Michael and Polly prepare to hang for their crimes, Tommy's reprieve comes just in time to save their lives. A year later, the Shelby family is scattered, its members estranged from one another. Ada returns from Boston for Christmas and visits each of them: John and Esme continue their relationship of sex and arguments, Arthur remains stifled by his new wife Linda's watchful eye, Michael uses cocaine to stay on top of the business, and Polly has fallen into an alcohol-fuelled mania. Each of the Peaky Blinders receives a letter from Vicente's son Luca Changretta, a black hand in New York City's Sicilian Mafia, marking them for death in retribution for the murder of Vicente. Tommy and Ada attempt to convince the others to regroup on Boxing Day. However, when Tommy discovers and kills a mafia agent among his household staff, he realises the assassination attempts are due to take place on Christmas Day and sends word to the rest of the gang. Michael goes to collect John and Esme, whom Tommy could not contact. A cart pulls up, and John and Michael are riddled by a hail of bullets.
| 20 | 2 | "Heathens" | David Caffrey | Steven Knight | 22 November 2017 | 3.31 |
Michael survives his injuries but John is killed. Tommy and the rest of the Peaky Blinders agree to put their differences aside while they deal with the mafia threat. Tommy suggests contacting Aberama Gold, a killer-for-hire, something Polly is strongly against. Tommy disobeys and uses John's funeral to draw Aberama out so that they can make a tentative deal. Enraged, Polly asks Michael to flee with her to Australia, but he refuses until she helps the Peaky Blinders through their current predicament. Linda discovers that Ada is under investigation by the government because of her marriage to a communist but does not pass the message on. Aberama agrees to fight for the Peaky Blinders if they accept his son, Bonnie Gold. After seeing him knock out a man much larger than he, Tommy and Arthur induct him into the Peaky Blinders. Jessie Eden rallies Tommy's workforce and convinces the factory to strike. Changretta manages to get into Tommy's office at the factory and threatens all the members of the Shelby family. They agree not to involve the police or harm children or civilians in their vendetta.
| 21 | 3 | "Blackbird" | David Caffrey | Steven Knight | 29 November 2017 | 3.43 |
The Italians launch another attack on the Peaky Blinders. Tommy realises that the Peaky Blinders need to evolve if they are to survive, but some of the gang are reluctant to part with tradition. As the strike takes hold at the Lanchester factory, Arthur is almost killed by Changretta's men. Tommy pays a personal visit to Jessie to find out how this ambush took place, but he is outmanoeuvred when she reveals something she knows about his past. Later, it is revealed that Polly and Changretta have a previous connection from the past, and they meet in a public place to discuss business. Polly claims that she will give Tommy to Changretta if he will spare the other members of the Shelby family.
| 22 | 4 | "Dangerous" | David Caffrey | Steven Knight | 6 December 2017 | 3.17 |
Arthur goes to the house of the family whose son he killed in a boxing match, expecting it to be an ambush by the Italian Mafia. Instead, it is a decoy, and their real target is Michael, still convalescing in the hospital. Changretta spares Michael, but repeats that he is expecting that Polly keeps her end of their agreement. Later, Changretta is almost murdered by Aberama at an ambush. Tommy sets up a fight for Bonnie. After visiting Michael in the hospital, Tommy drives away, only to be followed by Changretta and his gang.
| 23 | 5 | "The Duel" | David Caffrey | Steven Knight | 13 December 2017 | 3.16 |
Tommy leads Changretta's gang to Artillery Square. Tommy has prepared for the battle ahead of time thanks to Polly's heads-up. He kills three of Changretta's gang members before coming face to face with Changretta. However, the police arrive and break up the fight. Lizzie tells Tommy that she is pregnant with his child. After hiding Michael away from Changretta's gang, Polly shares an intimate moment with Aberama. Meanwhile, an army colonel has questions for Ada about her past as a communist. Tommy and Jessie have an intimate dinner, as Tommy looks to find out Jessie's communist contacts. Sensing an opportunity to capitalise on his situation, Changretta makes his way to London to present a plan to Alfie on how to kill the Shelby family at the upcoming boxing match.
| 24 | 6 | "The Company" | David Caffrey | Steven Knight | 20 December 2017 | 3.56 |
Tommy watches the boxing match with Arthur, who grows suspicious of Bonnie's opponent's seconds. When one of the seconds leaves the arena, Arthur follows him and seems to be mortally wounded in the fight that ensues. Audrey Changretta meets with Tommy under a flag of truce and states that the vendetta will be over if he signs over all of his assets to Luca. Luca and his men meet with the remaining Peaky Blinders in Tommy's basement distillery. Tommy reveals to Luca that he has sent Michael to the United States to negotiate with other American mafiosi and turn Luca's men against him. Arthur enters the distillery and shoots Luca, having faked his death to lure him into the trap. The Peaky Blinders celebrate the end of the vendetta at Tommy's countryside estate. Tommy confronts Alfie for his betrayal; Alfie reveals that he has skin cancer and knew Tommy would kill him. Tommy contacts Jessie to say that he wants to help her and thereby acquires the name of her communist party contacts. He takes the information to the Crown to secure an endorsement for his campaign for Member of Parliament, an election which Tommy wins.

=== Series 5 (2019) ===
| No. overall | No. in series | Title | Directed by | Written by | Original release date | UK viewers (millions) |
|---|---|---|---|---|---|---|
| 25 | 1 | "Black Tuesday" | Anthony Byrne | Steven Knight | 25 August 2019 | 6.25 |
Arthur receives an intimidating letter from the "Angels of Retribution". Tommy sends Aberama and Isiah to send a message to them. Finn, eager to prove himself, joins them and during a gunfight is shot in the arm. Meanwhile, Michael — who runs the Peaky Blinders' operations in the United States — is notified that the stock market has crashed and leaves for Birmingham with his girlfriend Gina. Tommy gets the news from Arthur about the crash and becomes furious after learning that Michael held on despite instructions to sell. The Peaky Blinders have a family meeting at the Garrison, where Tommy reveals that Aberama and Isiah were sent to kill a pimp who was blackmailing a senior member of the House of Lords. During the meeting, Polly tells Tommy and Arthur that Ada is pregnant. At the House of Commons, Tommy meets Oswald Mosley. Michael Levitt, a journalist, conducts an interview with Tommy and asks him questions about his past with a view to damaging his image as MP, but Tommy outmanoeuvres him by threatening to expose Mr. Levitt's homosexuality. Mr. Levitt is later killed by two men.
| 26 | 2 | "Black Cats" | Anthony Byrne | Steven Knight | 26 August 2019 | 5.92 |
Tommy discovers landmines and a scarecrow dressed as him on his farmland. He receives a call from IRA agent Captain Swing, who informs him that she has captured Michael from the men who supposedly want to kill Tommy and asks whether to spare him or kill him; as per Tommy's request, Michael walks free. Polly and Arthur go to the station to receive Michael; he introduces Gina as his new wife. Polly tells Michael that he cannot come home until he tells the truth about what happened at the dock. Tommy and Ada meet with Mosley, where Tommy tells Mosley that Ada advised against meeting him, for Mosley seems to be moving in the direction of fascism. At the Garrison pub, Tommy tells Polly about his black cat dream, implying that there is a traitor close by. Michael tells his side of the story and is tentatively cleared. Meanwhile, in a forest, a Scottish gang called the Billy Boys shoot Aberama in the shoulder and kill Bonnie. Aberama appears at Tommy's house with Johnny Dogs, whom he supposes to be the traitor, as he and the Lees were the only ones that knew about their position. Enraged, Lizzie comes out with a gun and Tommy calms her down.
| 27 | 3 | "Strategy" | Anthony Byrne | Steven Knight | 1 September 2019 | 5.76 |
Aberama is taken to a gypsy camp by Polly and told to lay low, but he instead departs to Scotland to wage war against the Billy Boys. Arthur, falling deeper into alcohol and cocaine abuse, agrees to go to Scotland in exchange for the whereabouts of one of Linda's friends, whom he blinds and disfigures when he fails to get Linda's whereabouts. Linda herself wishes to divorce from Arthur, but Lizzie discourages her. Michael continues to be given degrading orders as punishment for losing Tommy's fortune, nearly reaching a breaking point. Mosley, in a meeting with Tommy, Arthur and Michael, utilizes his leverage of withholding investigations of the murder of Mr. Levitt to coerce Tommy into joining the soon-to-be-created British Union of Fascists. Tommy reluctantly agrees in order to infiltrate their organization. In Scotland, Aberama and his men attack a group of Billy Boys, which ends with Aberama swearing revenge on gang leader Jimmy McCavern for Bonnie's death. The following morning, McCavern and the Billy Boys raid Aberama's camp, only to discover it has been booby-trapped with grenades, killing several of McCavern's men.
| 28 | 4 | "The Loop" | Anthony Byrne | Steven Knight | 8 September 2019 | 5.74 |
Tommy and Arthur meet with Brilliant Chang, a Chinese Triad businessman, to discuss a highly lucrative opium shipment. Tommy meets with McCavern to form a truce, especially given their mutual connection to Mosley, and uses this to test the opium shipment. To keep the truce, Tommy forces Aberama to postpone his quest for vengeance, offering a marriage to Polly in return. Mosley, in a meeting with Tommy, confides that he knows of Lizzie's past as a prostitute, and in response Tommy tells Mosley that he is aware of the latter's affairs with his sister-in-law and his wife's stepmother. Tommy, despite attempting to both hold his House of Commons standing and his agreement with Mosley, continues hallucinating about Grace, to the point of almost committing suicide. He confesses to Ada, who suggests he withdraw from opium himself. At a private exhibition of Swan Lake in Tommy's estate, Aberama proposes to Polly, who accepts; Michael tells Gina that he will be taking on the Peaky Blinders' opium business; and Arthur is confronted by Linda, who attempts to shoot him in retaliation for Arthur disfiguring her friend, but is shot by Polly.
| 29 | 5 | "The Shock" | Anthony Byrne | Steven Knight | 15 September 2019 | 5.42 |
Tommy, Polly and Arthur tend to Linda's gunshot wound, and as she recovers, she abandons Arthur. Mosley uses the stage at the end of Swan Lake to make an impassioned speech concerning the advent of the fascist movement in the United Kingdom, which all the Shelby family witness. Tommy attempts to deliver information and evidence to a hesitant Colonel Ben Younger, who informs him the government, the Ministry of Defense, and Section D all support Mosley, as they believe him to be a bulwark against a possible communist insurgency. As he leaves with the evidence, Ben is killed by a bomb in his car which also kills a child playing football in the street. Tommy informs Ada of Ben's death, who in turn reveals Ben was unaware of Ada's pregnancy with his child. Arthur, uncle Charlie Strong, Curly, Aberama and Isiah head to meet Chang and load the opium within their boat, but are ambushed on arrival by unknown assailants who became aware of Chang's deal with Tommy. Tommy visits Barney Thomason, an old comrade from the Great War locked in an insane asylum. He helps Barney escape in exchange for assassinating Mosley.
| 30 | 6 | "Mr Jones" | Anthony Byrne | Steven Knight | 22 September 2019 | 6.12 |
Tommy is called on at the House of Commons by Churchill, who inquires about Tommy's affiliation with the fascist party; Tommy informs him it is an infiltration. At a meeting, Michael and Gina attempt to propose a total restructuring of the Peaky Blinders company, which Tommy rebukes. Polly later resigns from the company. Tommy and Arthur execute Micky, the Garrison bartender, after it is discovered he was the one who informed on both Ben's meeting with Tommy prior to his death, as well as Arthur's ambush at London. Tommy then travels to Margate to ask for help from Alfie to stage a mutiny at Mosley's rally as a cover for the assassination. Finn carelessly spills the assassination plan to Billy Grade, who runs the fixed football racket. At the rally, Tommy saves Jessie from being arrested as the communists attempt a protest. Just as Barney and Aberama prepare to kill Mosley and McCavern respectively, they are killed by unknown persons. Mosley's rally is a success as Tommy breaks down in the aftermath. The following day, his torment over the previous night's events and Grace's apparition drive Tommy over the edge, causing him to attempt suicide.

=== Series 6 (2022) ===
| No. overall | No. in series | Title | Directed by | Written by | Original release date | UK viewers (millions) |
|---|---|---|---|---|---|---|
| 31 | 1 | "Black Day" | Anthony Byrne | Steven Knight | 27 February 2022 | 6.58 |
Following his prevented suicide by Lizzie and Arthur, Tommy receives a call from the IRA's Captain Swing who takes credit for foiling Mosley's attempted assassination as the IRA want to protect Mosley's future in British and Irish politics. She returns the bodies of Polly, Aberama and Barney, who were killed during the plot. The entire Shelby family gather for Polly's funeral with Michael swearing revenge on Tommy for his role in her death. In 1933, Tommy, now sober, sets up a meeting on Miquelon Island with an estranged Michael and business associates of Jack Nelson, a south Boston gang leader and Gina's uncle. Following unsuccessful talks to re-enter into business, Tommy lands Michael in prison for possession of opium. Meanwhile, back in Small Heath, Arthur's drug addiction continues to spiral following Polly's death. Later, Tommy is phoned by Lizzie who announces she, Charles and their daughter Ruby cannot travel to Canada due to Ruby's sudden illness. Believing her sickness is a message and gypsy related, Tommy decides to return to England. This episode was dedicated to Helen McCrory, who died in April 2021 during the production of series 6. Rather than music, the end credits are accompanied by the song of a male blackbird.
| 32 | 2 | "Black Shirt" | Anthony Byrne | Steven Knight | 6 March 2022 | 5.96 |
Tommy, still a Labour MP, returns to England and is informed Ruby is recovering. He has a seizure in the bathroom and Lizzie urges him to see a doctor, but he refuses. After Jack Nelson expresses interest in meeting the fascists, Tommy sees an opportunity in an alliance with Captain Swing. He visits Alfie and announces the death of his uncle in the Cotton Club in New York at the hands of Jack Nelson's gang. After a tense meeting with Mosley and his mistress Diana Mitford, Tommy meets Jack Nelson and agrees to feed information about England's politics to Nelson's gang in exchange for Tommy being able to sell his opium in Boston. Tommy is informed that Ruby is sick again and decides to contact Esme.
| 33 | 3 | "Gold" | Anthony Byrne | Steven Knight | 13 March 2022 | 5.08 |
As Ruby falls sick with consumption and is treated with gold, Tommy goes in search of the source of the curse that he believes has been laid upon his family and eventually reunites with Esme. Ada takes over Tommy's role in Birmingham and meets with Mosley, Diana, Jack Nelson and Gina. Meanwhile, Arthur heads to Liverpool to confront Hayden Stagg but ends up being belittled as Stagg further confronts Arthur about the state of his own mental health. Tommy discovers that the person to whom he gave the cursed sapphire that once belonged to Grace, who died after Tommy gave it to her, had a daughter that died at the age of seven, leading Tommy to believe that it was this woman who cursed Ruby in revenge. Tommy returns to Birmingham and goes straight to the hospital where Ruby is. Lizzie meets him at the entrance to tell him that the gold salts treatment failed, and that Ruby has died.
| 34 | 4 | "Sapphire" | Anthony Byrne | Steven Knight | 20 March 2022 | 4.70 |
While the Shelby family mourns, Tommy exacts revenge as he murders the family of the woman who cursed Ruby. Distraught in grief, Tommy ignores letters from his personal doctor as his relationship with Lizzie strains even further. Ada is targeted by Nazis and Arthur's addiction continues to spiral. The meeting between Tommy, Mosley, Diana, Jack Nelson and Captain Swing takes place: Jack Nelson agrees to let Tommy trade opium in Boston as he gains information from Mosley about the political future of England and agrees with Captain Swing that the Irish working class can be turned. Tommy finally meets with his doctor and is told that due to coming into contact with Ruby while she was ill, he has developed inoperable tuberculoma and that he has fewer than 18 months left to live. The episode ends with Tommy talking to Polly asking her to give him the time he needs to do what he must do.
| 35 | 5 | "The Road to Hell" | Anthony Byrne | Steven Knight | 27 March 2022 | 5.01 |
Tommy deals with the Chinese business that got Arthur hooked on opium by walking into their shop, taking their remaining drugs and throwing them into the canal with a bomb. He introduces his newly found son, Duke Shelby, at a family meeting, to Lizzie's disliking. Linda returns, wanting to help Arthur redeem himself once and for all, while Arthur forces Grade to kill a rogue referee who will not take their bribes. Grade is threatened by Jack Nelson and becomes his informant so that eventually, he can give up Arthur to him. Tommy sleeps with Diana as a payment for her cause. Eventually she tells Lizzie that Tommy was unfaithful to her, with Mosley believing that Tommy deserves better if he is to move up in the world. Michael meets with a priest in prison and is told that he may leave if he answers a question. Michael says that he has consulted Polly from beyond the grave and says that he is going to kill Tommy.
| 36 | 6 | "Lock and Key" | Anthony Byrne | Steven Knight | 3 April 2022 | 5.20 |
Lizzie finally leaves Tommy for his affair with Diana, taking Charles with her. Tommy sets the rest of the Peaky Blinders to dismantle his house, and gives false information to Billy Grade to lure the IRA into a trap; Duke eventually kills Grade when Finn refuses to do so and expels Finn from the family. Captain Swing and other IRA assassins go to the Garrison pub to kill Arthur, but are killed in a shootout in Garrison Lane, avenging Polly's death. On Miquelon Island, Tommy meets Michael, who has been released from prison. Johnny Dogs switches a car-bomb intended for Tommy, which kills Michael's associates. Tommy then shoots Michael dead, fulfilling Polly's prediction. A month after saying goodbye to the Shelby family, a solitary Tommy prepares to shoot himself. But when the spirit of Ruby visits him and shows his doctor pictured with Mosley and Diana on their wedding day, Tommy realises that he was given a false diagnosis. Tommy goes off to kill his doctor, but relents upon realising he is finally at peace. After returning and watching his wagon and remaining possessions burn, Tommy rides away.

== Ratings ==
Peaky Blinders : UK viewers per episode (millions)

| Series | Episode number | | | | | | Average |
| Series | 1 | 2 | 3 | 4 | 5 | 6 | Average |
|---|---|---|---|---|---|---|---|
| 1 | 3.05 | 2.45 | 2.20 | 2.31 | 2.03 | 2.24 | 2.38 |
| 2 | 2.31 | 2.18 | 2.20 | 2.06 | 2.10 | 2.24 | 2.18 |
| 3 | 2.95 | 2.43 | 2.20 | 2.19 | 2.24 | 2.27 | 2.38 |
| 4 | 3.44 | 3.31 | 3.43 | 3.17 | 3.16 | 3.56 | 3.35 |
| 5 | 6.25 | 5.92 | 5.76 | 5.74 | 5.42 | 6.12 | 5.87 |
| 6 | 6.58 | 5.96 | 5.08 | 4.70 | 5.01 | 5.20 | 5.42 |

Audience measurement performed by Broadcasters' Audience Research Board
