= Peaky Blinders (TV series) =

British period crime drama television series (2013–2022)

- Genre: Historical drama; Crime drama
- Created by: Steven Knight
- Written by: Steven Knight; Toby Finlay; Stephen Russell
- Directed by: Otto Bathurst & Tom Harper (series 1); Colm McCarthy (series 2); Tim Mielants (series 3); David Caffrey (series 4); Anthony Byrne (series 5–6)
- Starring: Full list
- Opening theme: "Red Right Hand" by Nick Cave and the Bad Seeds
- Country of origin: United Kingdom
- Original language: English
- No. of series: 6
- No. of episodes: 36 (list of episodes)

Production
- Executive producers: Caryn Mandabach; Jamie Glazebrook; Greg Brenman (series 1); Will Gould (series 2–4); Steven Knight; Cillian Murphy; Frith Tiplady (series 1–4); David Mason (series 5–6); Anthony Byrne (series 6)
- Producers: Katie Swinden (series 1); Laurie Borg (series 2); Simon Maloney (series 3); Joe Donaldson (series 4); Annie Harrison-Baxter (series 5); Nick Goding (series 6)
- Production locations: Birmingham (main setting); North Light Film Studios, Huddersfield (series 1–4); Space Studios Manchester, West Gorton (series 5–6)
- Running time: 55–83 minutes
- Production companies: Caryn Mandabach Productions; Tiger Aspect Productions; Screen Yorkshire

Original release
- Network: BBC Two (series 1–4); BBC One (series 5–6)
- Release: 12 September 2013 – 3 April 2022

Related
- Peaky Blinders: The Immortal Man

Peaky Blinders is a British historical crime drama television series created by Steven Knight. Set in Birmingham, it follows the exploits of the Peaky Blinders crime gang in the direct aftermath of the First World War. The fictional gang is loosely based on an urban youth gang active in the city from the 1880s to the 1920s.

The series features an ensemble cast: led by Cillian Murphy, starring as Tommy Shelby, Helen McCrory as Elizabeth "Polly" Gray, Paul Anderson as Arthur Shelby, Sophie Rundle as Ada Shelby, and Joe Cole as John Shelby, the group's senior members. Sam Neill, Annabelle Wallis, Iddo Goldberg, Tom Hardy, Charlotte Riley, Finn Cole, Natasha O'Keeffe, Paddy Considine, Adrien Brody, Aidan Gillen, Anya Taylor-Joy, Sam Claflin, Amber Anderson, James Frecheville, and Stephen Graham appeared across multiple episodes of the series. The series premiered on 12 September 2013 and was broadcast on BBC Two until the fourth series, after which it moved to BBC One for the fifth and sixth series.

Netflix, under a deal with the Weinstein Company and Endemol, acquired the rights to release the show in the United States and around the world. In January 2021, it was announced that the sixth series, released in 2022, would be the final series. A feature-length film titled Peaky Blinders: The Immortal Man, which is set a few years after the series finale, was released on 6 March 2026.

== Overview ==
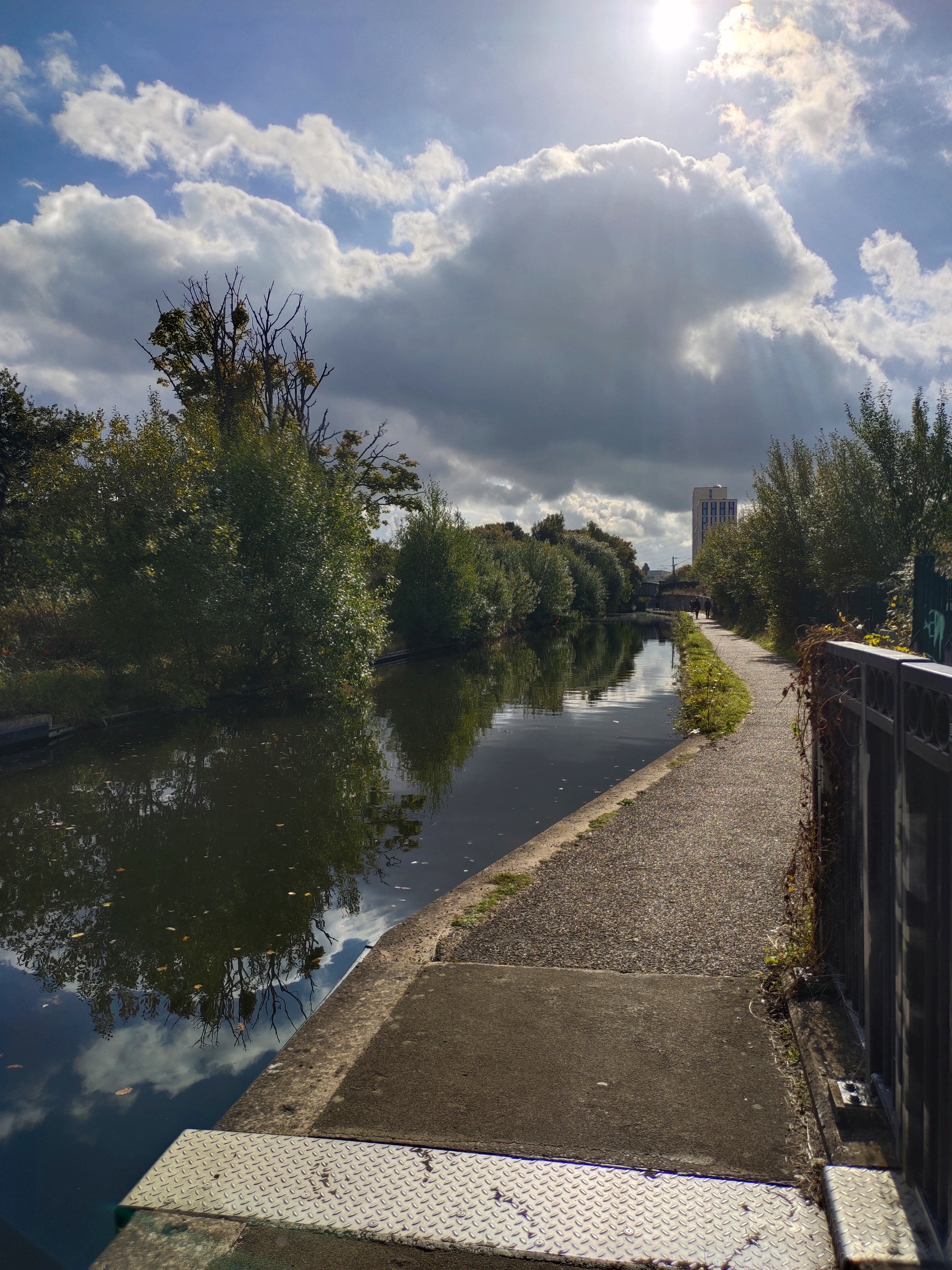
Worcester & Birmingham Canal

Peaky Blinders is a crime drama centred on a family of mixed Irish Traveller and Romani origins based in Birmingham, England, starting in 1919, several months after the end of the First World War. It centres on the Peaky Blinders street gang and their ambitious, cunning crime boss Tommy Shelby. The gang comes to the attention of Major Chester Campbell, a detective chief inspector in the Royal Irish Constabulary sent by Winston Churchill from Belfast, where he had been sent to fight against the Irish Republican Army flying columns, the Communist Party of Great Britain, street gangs, and common criminals in order to clean up the city. Winston Churchill (played by Andy Nyman in series 1 and Richard McCabe in series 2) charges him with suppressing disorder and uprising in Birmingham and recovering a stolen cache of arms and ammunition meant to be shipped to Libya. The first series concludes on 3 December 1919—"Black Star Day", the event where the Peaky Blinders plan to take over Billy Kimber's betting pitches at the Worcester Races.

The second series has the Peaky Blinders expand their criminal organisation in the "South and North while maintaining a stronghold in their Birmingham heartland". It begins in 1921 and ends with a climax at Epsom racecourse on 31 May 1922, Derby Day.

The third series takes place in 1924, following Tommy and the gang as they enter an even more dangerous world by expanding once again, this time internationally. The third series also features Father John Hughes (Paddy Considine), who is involved in an anti-communist organization; Ruben Oliver (Alexander Siddig), a painter whom Polly enlists to paint her portrait; Russian Grand Duchess Tatiana Petrovna (Gaite Jansen); and Linda Shelby (Kate Phillips), the new wife of Arthur.

The fourth series begins on Christmas Eve 1925, with the Peaky Blinders getting word that the New York Mafia, led by Luca Changretta (Adrien Brody), is coming to avenge the murder of Luca's father Vicente, killed by Tommy in the previous series, and ends following the general strike of May 1926, with Tommy using communist leader Jessie Eden for information and being elected as a Member of Parliament in 1927.

The fifth series runs two years later, from 29 October 1929 (Black Tuesday) to 7 December 1929, the morning after a rally led by Oswald Mosley.

The sixth series begins on 5 December 1933, as prohibition is repealed in the United States. The Nazi Party has obtained power in Germany, leading to a growth in membership of Mosley's British Union of Fascists. Tommy must not only deal with Mosley but also with plots from the Irish Mob as well as the Anti-Treaty IRA.

== Cast and characters ==
| Character | Portrayed by | Series | | | | | |
| Character | Portrayed by | 1 | 2 | 3 | 4 | 5 | 6 |
|---|---|---|---|---|---|---|---|
| Thomas "Tommy" Shelby | Cillian Murphy | Main | Main | Main | Main | Main | Main |
| Chief Inspector/Major Chester Campbell | Sam Neill | Main (Note: Neill is credited as a guest star in Episode #2.1, and returns to the main cast in Episode #2.2 onwards.) | Main | | | | |
| Elizabeth Pollyanna "Polly" Gray (née Shelby) | Helen McCrory | Main | Main | Main | Main | Main | |
| Arthur Shelby Jr. | Paul Anderson | Main | Main | Main | Main | Main | Main |
| Grace Shelby (née Burgess) | Annabelle Wallis | Main (Note: Wallis is credited as a guest star from Episode #2.1 – #2.4, and returns to the main cast from Episode #2.5 onwards.) (Note: Wallis is credited as a guest star in Episode #3.1, returns to the main cast for Episode #3.2, and is credited as a guest star in Episode #3.5.) | Main | Main | | Main | |
| Freddie Thorne | Iddo Goldberg | Main | | | | | |
| Ada Thorne, née Shelby | Sophie Rundle | Main | Main | Main | Main | Main | Main |
| John "Johnny" Shelby | Joe Cole | Main | Main | Main | Main | | |
| Charlie Strong | Ned Dennehy | Main | Main | Main | Main | Main | Main |
| Jeremiah "Jimmy" Jesus | Benjamin Zephaniah | Main (Note: Zephaniah is credited as a guest star from Episode #2.2 – #2.4, and returns to the main cast in Episode #2.6.) (Note: Zephaniah appears in only one episode of series 3, although credited with the main cast.) (Note: Zephaniah is credited with the main cast in Episode #6.1, as a guest star in Episode #6.4 and returns to the main cast in Episode #6.6.) | Main | Main | Main | Main | Main |
| Roberts | David Dawson | Main | | | | | |
| Winston Churchill | Andy Nyman | Main (Note: Nyman is credited as a guest star in Episode #1.1, and is credited with the main cast from Episode #1.2 onwards.) | | | | | |
| Winston Churchill | Richard McCabe | | Recurring | | | | |
| Winston Churchill | Neil Maskell | | | | | Main (Note: Maskell appears in only one episode of series 6, although credited with the main cast.) | Main |
| Billy Kimber | Charlie Creed-Miles | Main | | | | | |
| Arthur Shelby Sr. | Tommy Flanagan | Main (Note: Flanagan appears in only one episode, although credited with the main cast.) | | | | | |
| Darby Sabini | Noah Taylor | | Main | | | | |
| Alfred "Alfie" Solomons | Tom Hardy | | Main (Note: Hardy appears in only one episode of series 5, although credited with the main cast.) | Main | Main | Main | Main |
| May Fitz Carleton | Charlotte Riley | | Main | | Main | | |
| Michael Gray | Finn Cole | | Main (Note: Cole is credited as a guest star in Episode #2.2, and is credited with the main cast from Episode #2.3 onwards.) | Main | Main | Main | Main |
| Lizzie Shelby, née Stark | Natasha O'Keeffe | Guest | Main (Note: O'Keeffe is credited as a guest star in Episode #2.1 – #2.5, and is credited with the main cast from Episode #2.6 onwards.) | Main | Main | Main | Main |
| Esme Shelby-Lee | Aimee-Ffion Edwards | Recurring | Recurring | Main | Main | | Main |
| Grand Duchess Tatiana Petrovna | Gaite Jansen | | | Main | | | |
| Ruben Oliver | Alexander Siddig | | | Main | | | |
| Johnny Dogs | Packy Lee | Recurring | Recurring | Main | Main | Main | Main |
| Arch Duke Leon Romanov | Jan Bijvoet | | | Main | | | |
| Grand Duchess Izabella Petrovna | Dina Korzun | | | Main | | | |
| Father John Hughes | Paddy Considine | | | Main | | | |
| Linda Shelby | Kate Phillips | | | Recurring | Main | Main | Main |
| Jessie Eden | Charlie Murphy | | | | Main | Main | |
| Luca Changretta | Adrien Brody | | | | Main | | |
| Curly | Ian Peck | Recurring | Recurring | Recurring | Main | Main | Main |
| Bonnie Gold | Jack Rowan | | | | Main (Note: Rowan appears in only one episode of series 5, although credited with the main cast.) | Main | |
| Aberama Gold | Aidan Gillen | | | | Main | Main | |
| Gina Gray | Anya Taylor-Joy | | | | | Main | Main |
| Colonel Ben Younger | Kingsley Ben-Adir | | | | Guest | Main | |
| Sir Oswald Mosley | Sam Claflin | | | | | Main | Main |
| Jimmy McCavern | Brian Gleeson | | | | | Main | |
| Mother Superior | Kate Dickie | | | | | Main (Note: Dickie appears in only one episode, although credited with the main cast.) | |
| Brilliant Chang | Andrew Koji | | | | | Main | |
| Barney Thomason | Cosmo Jarvis | | | | | Main | |
| Finn Shelby | Alfie Evans-Meese | Recurring | | | | | |
| Finn Shelby | Harry Kirton | | Recurring | Recurring | Recurring | Recurring | Main |
| Laura McKee/Captain Swing | Charlene McKenna | | | | | Guest | Main (Note: McKenna is credited with the main cast in Episode #6.1, as a guest star from Episode #6.2 – #6.4 and returns to the main cast in Episode #6.6.) |
| Frances | Pauline Turner | | | | Recurring | Recurring | Main (Note: Turner is credited with the main cast in only one episode, Episode #6.1, and is credited as a guest star from Episode #6.4 – #6.6.) |
| Lady Diana Mitford (Note: A fictive version of Diana Mitford, who was never called "Lady Diana Mitford".) | Amber Anderson | | | | | | Main |
| Jack Nelson | James Frecheville | | | | | | Main |
| Hayden Stagg | Stephen Graham | | | | | | Main |
| Erasmus "Duke" Shelby | Conrad Khan | | | | | | Main |
| Isiah Jesus | Jordan Bolger | | Recurring | Recurring | Recurring | | |
| Isiah Jesus | Daryl McCormack | | | | | Recurring | Main (Note: McCormack is credited as a guest star from Episode #6.2 – #6.5 and is credited with the main cast in only one episode, Episode #6.6.) |
| Billy Grade | Emmett J. Scanlan | | | | | Recurring | Main (Note: Scanlan is credited as a guest star in Episode #6.5 and is credited with the main cast in only one episode, Episode #6.6.) |

=== Main ===
- Cillian Murphy as Thomas "Tommy" Shelby, the leader of the Peaky Blinders.
- Sam Neill as Chief Inspector/Major Chester Campbell (series 1–2), an Ulster Protestant policeman drafted from Belfast.
- Helen McCrory as Elizabeth Pollyanna "Polly" Gray (series 1–5), née Shelby, the aunt of the Shelby siblings, and treasurer of the Peaky Blinders.
- Paul Anderson as Arthur Shelby Jr., Tommy's best friend and eldest of the Shelby siblings.
- Annabelle Wallis as Grace Shelby (series 1–3, 5), née Burgess, a former undercover agent, and Irish Protestant. She is Tommy's first wife and mother of his son Charles.
- Iddo Goldberg as Freddie Thorne (series 1), a known communist who fought in the Great War with Tommy and was Ada's husband.
- Sophie Rundle as Ada Thorne, née Shelby, the only sister of the Shelby brothers.
- Joe Cole as John "Johnny" Shelby (series 1–4), the third-youngest Shelby brother and a member of the Peaky Blinders.
- Ned Dennehy as Charlie Strong, owner of a boatyard and an uncle figure to the Shelby siblings.
- Benjamin Zephaniah as Jeremiah 'Jimmy' Jesus, a preacher, and friend of the Peaky Blinders.
- David Dawson as Roberts (series 1), Billy Kimber's accountant.
- Andy Nyman (series 1), Richard McCabe (recurring series 2), and Neil Maskell (series 5–6) as Winston Churchill
- Charlie Creed-Miles as Billy Kimber (series 1), a local kingpin and leader of The Birmingham Boys who runs the local races.
- Tommy Flanagan as Arthur Shelby Sr. (series 1), the father of the Shelby siblings and Polly's brother.
- Noah Taylor as Darby Sabini (series 2), the leader of an Italian gang in Camden Town.
- Tom Hardy as Alfred "Alfie" Solomons (series 2–6), the leader of a Jewish gang in Camden Town.
- Charlotte Riley as May Fitz Carleton (series 2, 4), a wealthy widow who owns racehorses.
- Finn Cole as Michael Gray (series 2–6), Polly's biological son.
- Natasha O'Keeffe as Elizabeth "Lizzie" Shelby, née Stark (series 2–6; guest series 1), an ex-prostitute who worked for Tommy as his secretary. She is his second wife and the mother of his daughter Ruby.
- Aimee-Ffion Edwards as Esme Shelby-Lee (series 3–4, 6; recurring series 1–2), John's wife and a member of the Lee clan.
- Gaite Jansen as Princess Tatiana Petrovna (series 3), a White Russian princess who has an affair with Tommy.
- Alexander Siddig as Ruben Oliver (series 3), a portrait artist in a romantic relationship with Polly.
- Packy Lee as Johnny Dogs (series 3–6; recurring series 1–2), Tommy's Gypsy friend.
- Jan Bijvoet as Arch Duke Leon Romanov (series 3), Tatiana's uncle.
- Dina Korzun as Grand Duchess Izabella Petrovna (series 3), Tatiana's aunt.
- Paddy Considine as Father John Hughes (series 3), a priest working with the anti-communist Section D (the Economic League) in the British government
- Kate Phillips as Linda Shelby (series 4–6; recurring series 3), Arthur's wife who is a devout Christian.
- Charlie Murphy as Jessie Eden (series 4–5), a union convenor and Tommy's lover.
- Adrien Brody as Luca Changretta (series 4), a New York mafioso with a vendetta against the Peaky Blinders.
- Ian Peck as Curly (series 4–6; recurring series 1–3), a horse expert and Charlie's assistant.
- Jack Rowan as Bonnie Gold (series 4–5), Aberama's boxing champion son.
- Aidan Gillen as Aberama Gold (series 4–5), an ally of the Peaky Blinders and Polly's lover.
- Anya Taylor-Joy as Gina Gray (series 5–6), Michael's American wife.
- Kingsley Ben-Adir as Colonel Ben Younger (series 5; guest series 4), a young colonel who begins a relationship with Ada. He is also investigating socialist and fascist political activities.
- Sam Claflin as Sir Oswald Mosley (series 5–6), a fascist politician and leader of the British Union of Fascists.
- Brian Gleeson as Jimmy McCavern (series 5), the leader of the Billy Boys, a Glaswegian Protestant gang.
- Kate Dickie as Mother Superior (series 5), the head of a group of nuns.
- Andrew Koji as Brilliant Chang (series 5), a Chinese criminal leader involved in opium smuggling.
- Cosmo Jarvis as Barney Thomason (series 5), a WWI sniper who was Tommy's comrade and old friend who is locked in an insane asylum.
- Alfie Evans-Meese (recurring series 1) and Harry Kirton (series 6; recurring series 2–5) as Finn Shelby, the youngest Shelby brother and a member of the Peaky Blinders.
- Charlene McKenna as Laura McKee/ Captain Swing (series 6; guest series 5), an IRA leader from Belfast.
- Pauline Turner as Frances (series 6; recurring series 4–5), Tommy's housekeeper.
- Amber Anderson as Lady Diana Mitford (series 6), Mosley's second wife, one of the aristocratic Mitford sisters and a Fascist socialite.
- James Frecheville as Jack Nelson (series 6), a south Boston gang leader, Gina's uncle and Michael's boss in the United States. Nelson is based on Joseph Kennedy Sr.
- Stephen Graham as Hayden Stagg (series 6), the union convenor for the workers at the Liverpool docks.
- Conrad Khan as Erasmus "Duke" Shelby (series 6), Tommy's first-born son from before the Great War.
- Jordan Bolger (recurring series 2–4) and Daryl McCormack (series 6; recurring series 5) as Isiah Jesus, Jeremiah's son and a member of the Peaky Blinders.
- Emmett J. Scanlan as Billy Grade (series 6; recurring series 5), an ex-footballer turned singer and an ally to the Peaky Blinders.

=== Recurring ===
- Lobo Chan as Mr. Zhang (series 1), a business owner in Chinatown.
- Neil Bell (series 1) as Harry Fenton, a former landlord and owner of the Garrison pub.
- Samuel Edward-Cook as Danny "Whizz-Bang" Owen (series 1), Tommy's former comrade and a loyal member of the Peaky Blinders.
- Tony Pitts as Sergeant/Inspector Moss (series 1–4), a police officer from Birmingham.
- Kevin Metcalfe as Scudboat (series 1–2), a henchman of the Peaky Blinders.
- Jeffrey Postlethwaite as Henry (series 1–2), a Peaky Blinders henchman.
- Matthew Postlethwaite as Nipper (series 1–2), a Peaky Blinders henchman.
- Karl Shiels as Ryan (series 1), an IRA member who was shot by Grace.
- Tom Vaughan-Lawlor as Malachi Byrne (series 1), an IRA member, teetotal and Ryan's cousin.
- Simone Kirby as Irene O'Donnell (series 2), a Pro-Treaty IRA member, who works with Donal Henry and Inspector Campbell to blackmail Tommy into carrying out an assassination.
- Rory Keenan as Donal Henry (series 2), a spy who worked for the Irregulars against the Pro-Treaty IRA.
- Adam El Hagar as Ollie (series 2), Alfie's assistant.
- Sam Hazeldine as Georgie Sewell (series 2), the right-hand man and consiglieri to Sabini.
- Wanda Opalinska as Rosemary Johnson (series 2, 4), Michael's foster mother, whom she named Henry.
- Daniel Fearn as King Maine (series 2, 4), a boxing trainer in Birmingham who trains Arthur and Bonnie.
- Paul Bullion as Billy Kitchen (series 2), a Black Countryman, who briefly worked as a Head Baker for Tommy and Alfie.
- Josh O'Connor as James (series 2), Ada's friend and housemate.
- Dorian Lough as Mario (series 2), the owner of The Eden Club, ran by Sabini.
- Allan Hopwood as Abbey Heath (series 2)
- James Eeles as "The Digbeth Kid" Harold Hancox (series 2), an aspiring actor hired by the Peaky Blinders to get stood up and spend a week inside jail, only to be killed by Sabini's henchmen.
- Erin Shanagher as Mrs. Ross (series 2, 4), a vengeful mother who hates Arthur for the death of her son.
- George Gwyther (series 3) and Callum Booth-Ford (series 5–6) as Karl Thorne, the only child of Ada and Freddie.
- Stephanie Hyam as Charlotte Murray (series 3), a wealthy girl, with whom Michael has a short affair.
- Kenneth Colley as Vicente Changretta (series 3), the father to Changretta and his brother Angel.
- Bríd Brennan as Audrey Changretta (series 3–4), Changretta's mother, wife of Vicente Changretta, head of the Italian crime family in Birmingham, the enemy of the Peaky Blinders.
- Frances Tomelty as Bethany Boswell (series 3), a wise old woman living in Wales, whom Tommy seeks out.
- Richard Brake as Anton Kaledin (series 3), a Russian refugee, who attempted to discuss business with Sabini and Tommy on Tommy and Grace's wedding day.
- Alex Macqueen as Patrick Jarvis MP (series 3), a Member of Parliament and a member and representative of the Economic League, working with Father Hughes
- Ralph Ineson as Connor Nutley (series 3), a Lancaster factory foreman.
- Peter Bankole as William Letso (series 3), a former diamond miner and tunneler from the South African Labor Corps and Tommy's friend.
- Richard Dillane as General Curran (series 3), Grace's uncle.
- Dominic Coleman as Priest (series 3)
- Wendy Nottingham as Mary (series 3), Tommy's housekeeper.
- Dustin Demri-Burns as Monsieur Silk (series 3), a French jeweller.
- Billy Marwood (series 3), Jenson Clarke (series 4–5), and Billy Jenkins (series 6) as Charles Shelby, the son of Tommy and Grace.
- Luca Matteo Zizzari as Matteo (series 4), one of Changretta's henchmen.
- Jake J. Meniani as Frederico (series 4), one of Changretta's henchmen.
- Graeme Hawley as Niall Devlin (series 4), a working man in the Peaky Blinders Limited, working for Tommy.
- Donald Sumpter as Arthur Bigge (series 4), the King's Private Secretary, who deals with the case of the execution of Polly, Arthur, John and Michael.
- Jamie Kenna as Billy Mills (series 4), a former heavyweight boxing champion and a worker for the Shelby Company Limited, who fights against Bonnie at the company.
- Joseph Long as Chef (series 4)
- Andreas Muñoz as Antonio (series 4), the Italian assassin who came into Tommy's house as a sous-chef and planned to kill Tommy.
- Ethan Picard-Edwards as Billy Shelby (series 4), the son of Arthur and Linda.
- Dave Simon as Mulchay (series 4–5)
- Heaven-Leigh Clee (series 5) and Orla McDonagh (series 6) as Ruby Shelby, the daughter of Tommy and Lizzie.
- Elliot Cowan as Michael Levitt (series 5), a Birmingham journalist.
- Peter Campion as Micky Gibbs (series 5), barman of The Garrison pub.
- Tim Woodward as Lord Suckerby (series 5), a High Court Judge.
- Darragh O'Toole as Liam (series 6), an associate of Jack Nelson's.
- Peter Coonan as Connor Dunn (series 6), an associate of Jack Nelson's.
- Assaad Bouab as Henri (series 6), a bartender on Miquelon Island.
- Franc Bruneau as Miquelon Island Police Commissioner (series 6), Head of Police Department on Miquelon Island.
- Simon Wan as Han (series 6), an opium dealer who operates through a cafe in Birmingham's Chinatown.
- Julian Moore-Cook as Pat (series 6).
- Naomi Yang as Li (series 6), Han's wife.
- Aneurin Barnard as Doctor Holford (series 6), Tommy's personal doctor.
- Abbie Hern as Mary Bone (series 6), Finn's wife.

== Episodes ==
| Series | Episodes | Originally released | | | Average UK viewers (millions) |
| Series | Episodes | First released | Last released | Network | Average UK viewers (millions) |
|---|---|---|---|---|---|
| 1 | 6 | 12 September 2013 | 17 October 2013 | BBC Two | 2.38 |
| 2 | 6 | 2 October 2014 | 6 November 2014 | BBC Two | 2.18 |
| 3 | 6 | 5 May 2016 | 9 June 2016 | BBC Two | 2.38 |
| 4 | 6 | 15 November 2017 | 20 December 2017 | BBC Two | 3.35 |
| 5 | 6 | 25 August 2019 | 22 September 2019 | BBC One | 5.87 |
| 6 | 6 | 27 February 2022 | 3 April 2022 | BBC One | 5.42 |

== Production ==
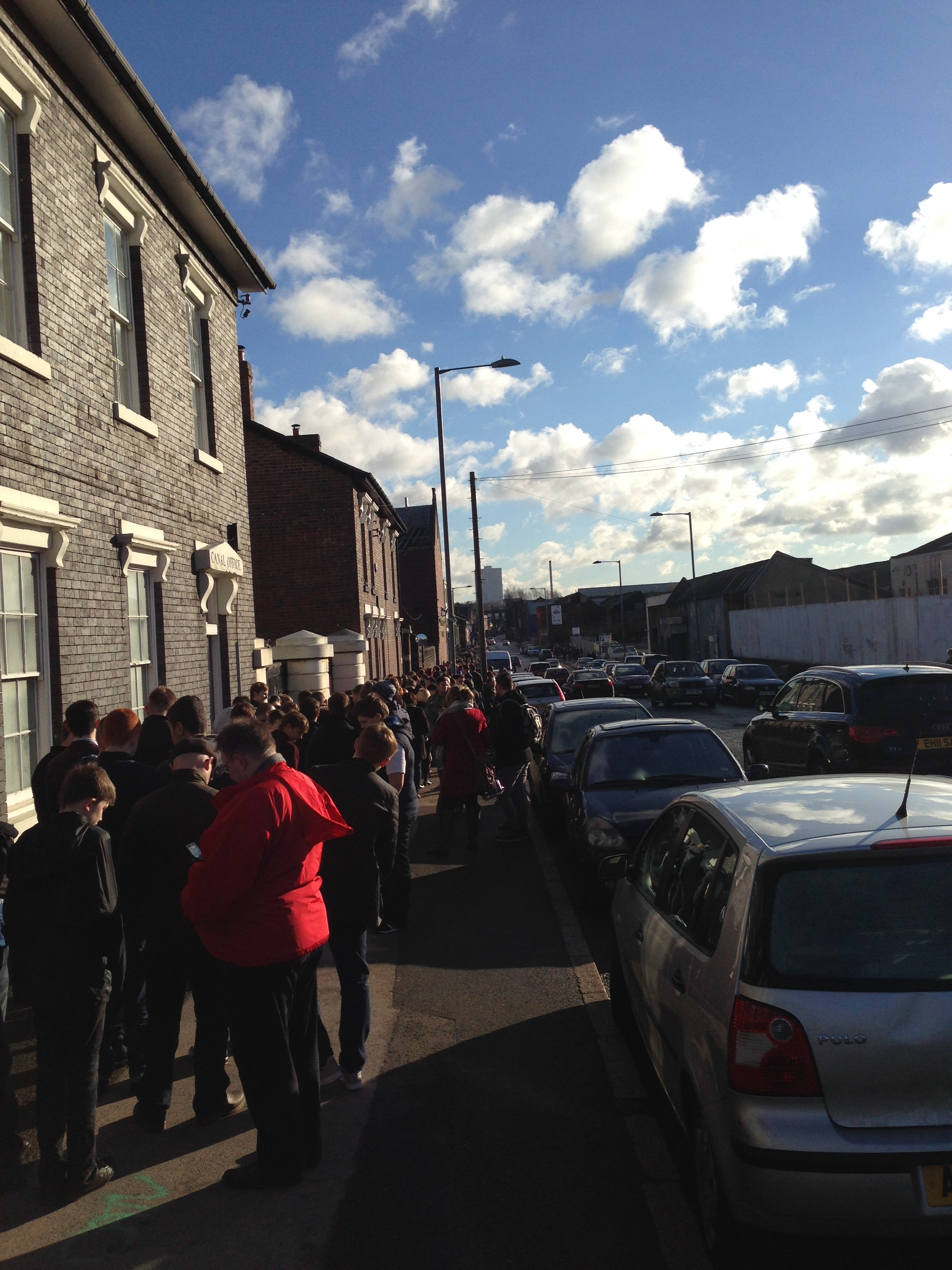
Candidates for roles as teenage male extras queuing in Birmingham

Peaky Blinders was created and written by Steven Knight. Screen Yorkshire provided funding for the production through the Yorkshire Content Fund, ensuring that the majority of the show was filmed in Yorkshire as part of the deal. Linguists were not hired in the production to assist in the show, leading to the Romani Gypsies in the earlier series frequently speaking broken Romanian (as opposed to Romani). This series shot in 1.85:1 720i HD, which is rented by BBC Two. All seasons of the show using main scenes at Small Heath/Industrial Area in Birmingham. From series 3, the audio format changed from Dolby Surround 2.0 to Dolby Surround 5.1. The series was filmed at North Light Film Studios in Huddersfield for series 1 to 4 (at the outskirts of Leeds), with the series is transferred to Space Studios Manchester in West Gorton for seasons 5 & 6 as part of an out-of-Leeds production plan. With the move from Huddersfield also comes a move from BlueBolt to Dupe VFX as the visual effects provider. Series 5 & 6 now shot in 2.10:1 1080i 4K UHD and replace Dolby Surround 5.1 audio with Dolby Atmos Audio.

=== Series 1 ===
The first series was filmed in Birmingham, Bradford, Dudley, Leeds, Liverpool, and Port Sunlight. Railway sequences were filmed between Keighley and Damems, using carriages from the Ingrow Museum of Rail Travel (owned by Vintage Carriages Trust), and carriages owned by the Lancashire and Yorkshire Railway Trust. Many of the scenes for the show were filmed at the Black Country Living Museum. Steven Knight, Stephen Russell and Toby Finlay all had writing credits on the series.

Ulster-born, New Zealand-raised Sam Neill enlisted the help of Northern Irish actors James Nesbitt and Liam Neeson to help him recover his lost Northern Irish accent for the role of C.I. Campbell. In the end, he had to tone down the accent since the series was marketed in the United States.

=== Series 2 ===
A second series was commissioned shortly after the broadcast of the first and aired in October and November 2014. On 11 January 2014, auditions were held in Digbeth area of Birmingham (near where parts of the series are set) for white and mixed race teenage male extras, resulting in lengthy queues.

=== Series 3 ===
Shortly after the final episode of the second series, the show announced via its Twitter account that it had been renewed for a third series. On 5 October 2015, the official Peaky Blinders Twitter account announced that filming had begun for series 3. Filming completed on 22 January 2016, after 78 days of shooting.

=== Series 4 ===
During the initial broadcast of series 3, the BBC renewed Peaky Blinders for series 4 and 5, each of which comprises six episodes. Filming for series 4 started in March 2017 and premiered on 15 November 2017 on BBC Two. Both the Weinstein Company and its logo in its credits weren't included, even though the company was formerly involved in the US distribution of the series.

=== Series 5 ===
The BBC commissioned a fifth series in mid-2016. On 22 August 2018, it was confirmed that series 5 would be broadcast on BBC One. Having already premiered to a select audience at Birmingham Town Hall on 18 July 2019, the series began airing on BBC One on 25 August 2019.

=== Series 6 ===
On 5 May 2018, Steven Knight told Birmingham Press Club that "we are definitely doing [series] six". Production on the series was due to begin in March 2020, but was delayed due to the COVID-19 pandemic. During 2020, rumours emerged linking comedian Rowan Atkinson to the show for the role of Adolf Hitler in series 6, but the producers denied the involvement saying that the news was "completely false".

On 18 January 2021, it was announced that series six, which had just begun filming, would be the final television series of the show, though Knight said that "the story will continue in another form". Helen McCrory, who played Polly Gray, died in April 2021; her character was written out of the series. Series six premiered on 27 February 2022.

== Reception ==
Throughout its run, Peaky Blinders received widespread critical acclaim. David Renshaw of The Guardian summarised the series as a "riveting, fast-paced tale of post-first world war Birmingham gangsters", praising Murphy as the "ever-so-cool Tommy Shelby" and the rest of the cast for their "powerful performances". Sarah Crompton of The Telegraph gave the series four out of five, praising the show for its originality and "taking all of our expectations and confounding them". Alex Fletcher from Digital Spy believes that "Peaky Blinders has started as sharp as a dart", while Den of Geek called the series "the most intelligent, stylish and engrossing BBC drama in ages". Cult TV Times critic Hugh David said the show "warrants the billing" by "managing to tick several ratings boxes – period drama, gangster epic, film star leads – yet go against the grain of those in the most interesting of ways".

The show has been particularly celebrated for its stylish cinematography and charismatic performances, as well as for casting an eye over a part of England and English history rarely explored on television. Historians have been divided over whether bringing characters and events from other decades into a 1920s story undermines claims to historical accuracy, or whether working-class life in the period is nevertheless depicted in a truthful and resonant way. Reviews of the second series remained positive, with Ellen E. Jones of The Independent commenting that "Peaky Blinders can now boast several more big-name actors to supplement the sterling work of Cillian Murphy, Helen McCrory and Sam Neill", referring to second series additions Tom Hardy and Noah Taylor.

Several critics have compared the show favourably to the American series Boardwalk Empire, which shares the same themes and historical context. Show writer Steven Knight stated in an early interview: "Do you know – and I'm not just saying this – but I've never watched them. I've never seen The Wire, I've never seen Boardwalk Empire, I've never seen any of them." When asked if he deliberately avoided watching those shows, he responded: "It's sort of deliberate in that I don't really want to be looking at other people's work because it does affect what you do inevitably." On 2 March 2016, Knight told the Crime Scene Quarterly "I've had unsolicited communication from Michael Mann, the film director, from Dennis Lehane, Snoop Dogg – he's such a fan. And the late David Bowie was a huge fan – more of that to come" (strongly hinting Bowie's involvement on series three). It was later confirmed that Bowie's music would be featured, and Leonard Cohen had also written a new song for series three.

On Metacritic, it has a weighted average score of 86 out of 100 based on seven reviews. The last series holds a 93% approval rating on Rotten Tomatoes based on 14 reviews, with an average critic rating of eight out of ten. The website's critical consensus reads, "Peaky Blinders' sixth series gracefully addresses the untimely passing of star Helen McCrory while setting the stage for a fitting climax to this epic saga of likable scalawags."

Although the series received widespread critical acclaim, the filmmakers appeared to place less emphasis on providing the characters with a clearly defined Romani background, focusing instead on creating "gypsy characters" that serve various narrative functions. This situates the protagonists on the margins of society, allowing the series to address themes of intersectionality relevant to contemporary discussions and to depict the lower strata of British interwar society, which are often underrepresented in popular culture. The series portrays these “gypsy figures” not solely as victims but as active agents in shaping events. However, their actions are frequently depicted as violent and deceitful, reinforcing certain antigypsyist stereotypes.

=== Depiction of Jessie Eden ===
Series four introduced the character Jessie Eden, based on the real-life British communist and trade union leader. Although the reception was mixed, some people who had known Jessie Eden took offence to the way she was depicted. Graham Stevenson, a trade union leader and writer on British communism, a friend of Jessie Eden and the writer of her biography, was a harsh critic of the show,

I knew Eden, and as a callow 22-year-old, I didn't ask the 70-year-old Jessie about her relationships, let alone sex life. But I doubt her private life was as complicated or dramatic as her eponymous character's. Nor can I see any young woman during the 1920s gratuitously going into a gents' toilets, as Eden is shown doing, for any reason at all other than life or death. The social values of the programme are ahistorical. It is surely the conceit that Tommy Shelby, the gangster villain-hero of the series, could ever convince a woman like Eden to be wined and dined, let alone be seduced, that finally reveals the true motives of the creators of the programme.

Stevenson also criticised the show for its clothing choices, incorrectly showing Churchill as Home Secretary in 1919, incorrectly depicting Eden as a mass leader during the 1926 General Strike; eventually these inaccuracies led Stevenson to stop watching the show. He went on to say "Although the TV series' cinematography, music and fast-paced action is obviously attractive, especially matched to outstanding charismatic performances, it's disappointing that an expert in Tudor history was the historical adviser to the series, rather than someone with a background in trade unionism or communism".

At a round table event featuring Stevenson, the poet Dave Puller, and cultural historian Paul Long, the three discussed the series and its depictions of the British working class. Long rated the series positively and praised the series as a great representation of interesting working-class protagonists. Puller had mixed feelings and was disappointed that the show chose to focus on Jessie Eden's fictional romance with Tommy, rather than her real achievements as a communist and a trade union leader.

== Awards and nominations ==
| Series | Award | Category | Nominee(s) | Result | Ref. |
|---|---|---|---|---|---|
| 1 | British Academy Television Craft Awards | Best Director: Fiction | Otto Bathurst | Won | |
| 1 | British Academy Television Craft Awards | Best Original Music | Martin Phipps | Nominated | |
| 1 | British Academy Television Craft Awards | Best Photography and Lighting: Fiction | George Steel | Won | |
| 1 | British Academy Television Craft Awards | Best Production Design | Grant Montgomery | Nominated | |
| 1 | British Academy Television Craft Awards | Best Sound: Fiction | Stuart Hilliker, Brian Milliken, Matthew Skelding, Lee Walpole | Nominated | |
| 1 | British Academy Television Craft Awards | Best Special, Visual & Graphic Effects | Bluebolt (VFX), Rushes (Colourist) | Nominated | |
| 1 | Biarritz International Festival of Audovisual Programming | Best Actor in a TV Series or Serial | Cillian Murphy | Won | |
| 1 | Biarritz International Festival of Audovisual Programming | Best Actress in a TV Series or Serial | Helen McCrory | Won | |
| 1 | Biarritz International Festival of Audovisual Programming | Best Music in a TV Series or Serial | Martin Phipps | Won | |
| 1 | Crime Thriller Awards UK | Best Supporting Actress | Helen McCrory | Nominated | |
| 1 | RTS Programme Awards | Best Drama Series | Production team | Won | |
| 1 | RTS Craft & Design Awards | Best Costume Design: Drama | Stephanie Collie | Won | |
| 1 | RTS Craft & Design Awards | Best Make-Up Design: Drama | Loz Schiavo | Nominated | |
| 1 | RTS Craft & Design Awards | Best Production Design: Drama | Grant Montgomery | Nominated | |
| 1 | RTS Craft & Design Awards | Judges' Award | Production team | Won | |
| 1 | Televisual Bulldog Awards | Best Drama One-Off or Serial | Production team | 2nd Place | |
| 2 | British Academy Television Awards | Best Drama Series | Production team | Nominated | |
| 2 | British Academy Television Craft Awards | Best Make-Up and Hair | Loz Schiavo | Nominated | |
| 2 | British Academy Television Craft Awards | Best Photography and Lighting: Fiction | Simon Dennis | Nominated | |
| 2 | British Academy Television Craft Awards | Best Production Design | Grant Montgomery | Nominated | |
| 2 | Irish Film & Television Academy | Best Leading Actor in a Drama Series | Cillian Murphy | Nominated | |
| 2 | Irish Film & Television Academy | Best Costume Design | Lorna Marie Mugan | Won | |
| 2 | Irish Film & Television Academy | Best Director: Drama Series | Colm McCarthy | Nominated | |
| 2 | RTS Programme Awards | Best Drama Series | Production Team | Nominated | |
| 2 | RTS Craft & Design Awards | Best Photography: Drama | Simon Dennis | Nominated | |
| 2 | Writers' Guild of Great Britain Awards | Best TV Drama – Long Form | Steven Knight | Nominated | |
| 3 | National Television Awards | Best Period Drama Series | Production team | Nominated | |
| 3 | National Television Awards | Best Drama Performance | Cillian Murphy | Nominated | |
| 3 | Irish Film and Television Awards | Best Leading Actor in a Drama Series | Cillian Murphy | Won | |
| 4 | National Television Awards | Outstanding Drama Series | Peaky Blinders | Won | |
| 4 | National Television Awards | Best Drama Performance | Cillian Murphy | Nominated | |
| 4 | British Academy Television Awards | Best Drama Series | Production team | Won | |
| 4 | British Academy Television Craft Awards | Best Costume Design | Alison McCosh | Nominated | |
| 4 | British Academy Television Craft Awards | Best Editing: Fiction | Dan Roberts (for "The Duel") | Nominated | |
| 4 | British Academy Television Craft Awards | Best Make Up & Hair Design | Loz Schiavo | Nominated | |
| 4 | British Academy Television Craft Awards | Best Sound: Fiction | Forbes Noonan, Ben Norrington, Jim Goddard, Grant Bridgeman | Nominated | |
| 4 | British Academy Television Craft Awards | Best Writer: Drama | Steven Knight | Nominated | |
| 4 | TV Choice Awards | Best Drama Series | Production team | Won | |
| 4 | TV Choice Awards | Best Actor | Cillian Murphy | Won | |
| 4 | TV Choice Awards | Best Actress | Helen McCrory | Nominated | |
| 4 | Irish Film & Television Awards | Best Leading Actor in a Television Drama | Cillian Murphy | Won | |
| 4 | Irish Film & Television Awards | Best Supporting Actress in a Television Drama | Charlie Murphy | Won | |
| 4 | Irish Film & Television Awards | Best Director in a Television Drama | David Caffrey | Nominated | |
| 4 | Irish Film & Television Awards | Best Editing | Dermot Diskin | Nominated | |
| 4 | Irish Film & Television Awards | Best Cinematography | Cathal Watters | Nominated | |
| 5 | National Television Awards | Outstanding Drama Series | Peaky Blinders | Won | |
| 5 | National Television Awards | Best Drama Performance | Cillian Murphy | Won | |
| 5 | British Academy Television Craft Awards | Best Make-Up & Hair Design | Loz Schiavo | Won | |
| 5 | Irish Film & Television Awards | Best Leading Actor in a Television Drama | Cillian Murphy | Nominated | |
| 5 | Irish Film & Television Awards | Best Director in a Television Drama | Anthony Byrne | Nominated | |
| 5 | Cinema Audio Society Awards | Outstanding Achievement in Sound Mixing for Television Series – One Hour | Stu Wright, Nigel Heath, Brad Rees, Jimmy Robertson, Oliver Brierley, Ciaran Smith (for "Mr. Jones") | Nominated | |
| 6 | National Television Awards | Best Returning Drama | Peaky Blinders | Won | |
| 6 | National Television Awards | Best Drama Performance | Cillian Murphy | Won | |
| 6 | RTS Craft & Design Awards | Costume Design – Drama | Alison McCosh | Won | |
| 6 | Art Directors Guild Awards | Excellence in Production Design for a One-Hour Period Single-Camera Series | Nicole Northridge (for "Black Day") | Nominated | |
| 6 | British Academy Television Awards | Best Actor | Cillian Murphy | Nominated | |

== Broadcast and release ==
On 24 September 2014, it was announced that Netflix had acquired exclusive US distribution rights from the Weinstein Company and Endemol. The entirety of series 1 became available for streaming on 30 September 2014; series 2 launched in November 2014. Series 3 was made available 31 May 2016. Due to licensing restrictions, however, most of the show's original soundtrack is not available on the Netflix-distributed version of the series. In 2018, it was announced Peaky Blinders would be moved from its original broadcast channel, BBC Two, to BBC One for its fifth and sixth series.

== Cultural impact ==
The series has been considered a cult classic. According to the Office for National Statistics (ONS), Peaky Blinders has had a detectable cultural impact in the UK. In 2018, the name Arthur surged into the top 10 boys names for the first time since the 1920s, and Ada jumped into the girls' top 100 for the first time in a century as well. The assumption reached by the ONS is that the popularity of these names was inspired by the characters Arthur Shelby Jr. and Ada Thorne.

On 5 December 2024, soldiers of the National Guard of Ukraine from the "Peaky Blinders" unit received gifts from the series' creators of the same name. In 2025, four Afghan men were ordered to report to the Taliban government's department of vice and virtue for dressing in costumes inspired by the TV series.

In 2025 creator Steven Knight commissioned poet Bradley Taylor, who as of 2026 is the poet laureate of Birmingham, to deliver his remarks in a spoken-word poem inspired by the show, "By Order of the People," at the unveiling of a West Midlands launch plan.

== Franchise ==
=== Film ===
Following the announcement that the sixth series would be the last, Knight clarified that, following the year-long production hiatus in 2020, it had been decided to produce a feature-length movie in place of a seventh television series, with other connected television series potentially following. Peaky Blinders won the Returning Drama award at the 2022 National Television Awards ceremony, with Knight subsequently confirming during his acceptance speech that that film would begin production in mid-spring 2023, but would later be delayed. In June 2024, the Peaky Blinders film was confirmed by Netflix with Cillian Murphy reprising his role as Thomas Shelby. Production began in September 2024 under the title The Immortal Man. The film was released in cinemas on 6 March 2026, and on Netflix two weeks later on 20 March 2026.

=== Sequel series ===
In October 2025, a sequel series was announced, produced by Kudos and Garrison Drama for BBC One and Netflix, with Murphy serving as an executive producer. Principal photography began in March 2026, with Jamie Bell, Charlie Heaton, Jessica Brown Findlay, Lashana Lynch, and Lucy Karczewski joining the main cast.

=== Other media ===
In August 2020, a video game based on the television series, titled Peaky Blinders: Mastermind, was developed by FuturLab and released for Xbox One, PlayStation 4, Nintendo Switch, and for PC via Steam. A virtual reality game, Peaky Blinders: The King's Ransom, was developed by Maze Theory and released for Meta Quest 2 and PICO 4 on 9 March 2023.

In September 2022, Rambert Dance presented a dance production based on the series titled Peaky Blinders: The Redemption of Thomas Shelby directed and choreographed by Benoit Swan Pouffer, written by Knight. It premiered at the Birmingham Hippodrome, before touring the UK and was filmed for the BBC.

== Bibliography ==
- Long, Paul (2017), "Class, Place and History in the Imaginative Landscapes of Peaky Blinders", in Forrest, D.; Johnson, B. (eds.), Social Class and Television Drama in Contemporary Britain, Palgrave, p. 165
- Brittnacher, Hans Richard (2024), Messerstecher und Schwarzbrenner – die Zählebigkeit antiziganistischer und antisemitischer Stereotype in „Peaky Blinders“, in Mladenova, Radmila (Hrsg.): Counterstrategies to the Antigypsy Gaze, Heidelberg: Heidelberg University Publishing, 2024 (2024) (Antiziganismusforschung interdisziplinär: Schriftenreihe der Forschungsstelle Antiziganismus, Band 5), S. 339–355.
