= Jessie Eden =

British trade union activist (1902–1986)

- Jessie Eden photographed in 1976
- Born: Jessie Shrimpton; 24 February 1902; Birmingham, England
- Died: 27 September 1986 (aged 84); Birmingham, England
- Other names: Jessie Shrimpton (1902–1923); Jessie McCulloch (1948–1986)
- Occupations: Trade union shop steward, factory worker
- Organisation(s): Transport and General Workers' Union T&G / TGWU
- Known for: Communist activist, trade union leader, rent strike leader
- Political party: Communist Party of Great Britain (CPGB)
- Spouses: Albert Eden (m. 1923) Walter McCulloch (m. 1948; died 1978)
- Children: 2
- Honours: T&G – Gold Medal

Jessie Eden (née Shrimpton; 24 February 1902 – 27 September 1986) was a British trade union leader and communist activist, most famous for leading between 40,000 and 50,000 households during the Birmingham rent-strike of 1939.

She convinced women at Birmingham's Joseph Lucas motor factory to join the 1926 UK General Strike, and led an unprecedented and successful strike of 10,000 factory worker women in 1931. Later in life, she served for three decades as Birmingham city's federation of council house tenants and she was also involved in the construction of the Soviet Union's Moscow Metro. Her involvement in the trade unions of the English Midlands led to a massive increase in women joining British trade unions.

She was a lifelong supporter of both the Transport and General Workers' Union (T&G), and of the Communist Party of Great Britain (CPGB) of which she was a leading member. For her commitment to helping improve the working conditions of English factory workers, she was awarded the T&G gold medal from Ernest Bevin.

== Early life ==
Jessie Eden was born on 24 February 1902 at 61 Talbot Street, which was then listed as Birmingham's All Saints sub-district. Her mother was a 17-year-old suffrage campaigner also called Jessie, and her father was a "jeweller journeyman" called William. She grew up with her family in the Jewellery Quarter of Hockley, Birmingham. This district of Birmingham was close to the Lucas Electrics factory, where Eden later become a worker, and would become famous for due to her trade union activism. Jessie was the eldest of three daughters of Jessie and William, the other two called May and Nell. By 1911 the family were living at 32 Court 2 House, Bridge Street, and her father now aged 27 was working as a "wireman".

A brief marriage in the summer of 1923 in Kings Norton to a man called Albert Eden would see Jessie change her last name from Shrimpton to Eden, the name for which she would become most known. Later in life, she described her short marriage to Eden as a "folly", and that she was unsatisfied with being married to somebody who did not share her political beliefs. Despite the marriage's short length, the couple adopted a son called Douglas (Douggie to friends), however, his parental status is disputed and many members of Eden's family believe that Douglas was a blood relative of Jessie Eden.

== Union leadership and political activism ==
=== 1926 general strike ===
Eden became a factory worker filling shock absorbers at Birmingham's Lucas Electronics factory and a union steward for the factory's only section of unionised women. During the 1926 United Kingdom general strike, she convinced these same unionised worker women to walk out of the factory and join the strike. Both of her parents were very supportive of her trade union activism, with her father joining her during the general strike and her mother hanging a red flag from their home's front window.

"One policeman put his hands on my arms. They were telling me to go home, but the crowd howled … 'Hey, leave her alone'… and some men came and pushed the policemen away. They didn't do anything after that. I think they could see there would have been a riot. I was never frightened of the police or the troops because I had the people with me, you see."

— Jessie Eden, 50th anniversary of the 1926 general strike, Birmingham Post 1976, as published in The Guardian

=== 1931 Birmingham women's strike ===
In 1931 Eden organised another strike, this time leading 10,000 non-unionised women on a week-long strike, during which she joined the Communist Party of Great Britain (CPGB). Before the strike, Eden had noticed that factory supervisors had been closely observing her work, and it was soon discovered by Eden and her fellow workers that the supervisors were monitoring her because she was a fast worker and that they planned to use her work speed as a standard for all the other workers in the factory. Eden approached the Amalgamated Engineering Union (AEU), however, they did not allow women to join their membership, so she instead approached the Transport and General Workers' Union (T&W). In protest to the factory's plans, Eden organised a mass walkout of 10,000 women, who refused to work for a week. The strike was successful and the Lucas Electrics factory management was forced to back down. After the victory, the overjoyed factory workers were so ecstatic that the factory could not function during normal hours and had to be closed early. One of the communist activists who had encouraged Eden was raised up upon the shoulders of factory workers at a dinner hour in celebration.

This strike was described by the Trades Union Congress (TUC) as "unprecedented at the time", and led to the T&G's leader (then Ernest Bevin) to award Jessie Eden with the union's Gold Medal. Eden's leadership and organisation of the strike prompted a massive increase in the number of women in the midlands joining British trade unions.

=== Life in the Soviet Union ===
After the 1931 strike the Communist Party (of which she was a lifelong member) arranged for her to travel to the Soviet Union to help rally women workers to help build the Moscow Metro in 1934. She spent two and a half years in the Soviet Union, although despite her skills in worker organisation, her work did very little to speed up the progress of the Moscow Metro, due largely to language difficulties. During her time in the Soviet Union, she became involved with the Comintern's Lenin School, and was elected a Shock Worker at the Stalin automotive plant (later renamed the ZiL automotives).

Later in life, Eden told her daughter-in-law that she had travelled to the Soviet Union in secret, and that most people believed she had disappeared.

=== 1939 Birmingham rent strike ===
After returning from the Soviet Union, Eden again led another successful strike in the city of Birmingham. In 1939, as a protest against slum-like conditions of housing in the city of Birmingham, Eden organised a mass rent strike of nearly 50,000 tenants. She would continue her activism in the field of housing rights and spend nearly three decades as the leader of Birmingham city's federation of council house tenants.

=== Election campaigns ===
Eden contested the Handsworth constituency during the 1945 general election, winning 3.4% (1,390) of the vote.

Later in November 1945, she took part as a candidate in the municipal elections, short of winning by 2,887 votes.

== In popular culture ==
=== Appearance in Peaky Blinders ===
In the 2020s, Eden became widely known as a character in the fictional British television series Peaky Blinders. The series generated renewed interest in British trade union history, as well as controversy over how her personal life was portrayed.

Series 4 and 5 of Peaky Blinders introduced the Eden character, played by Irish actress Charlie Murphy. Although the reception was mixed, some people who had known Eden personally took offence to the way she was depicted. Trade union leader Graham Stevenson—a personal friend of Eden, author of her biography, and author of articles on British communism—criticised the show:

"I knew Eden, and as a callow 22-year-old, I didn't ask the 70-year-old Jessie about her relationships, let alone sex life. But I doubt her private life was as complicated or dramatic as her eponymous character's. Nor can I see any young woman during the 1920s gratuitously going into a gents' toilets, as Eden is shown doing, for any reason at all other than life or death. The social values of the programme are ahistorical. It is surely the conceit that Tommy Shelby, the gangster villain-hero of the series, could ever convince a woman like Eden to be wined and dined, let alone be seduced, that finally reveals the true motives of the creators of the programme."

At a round table event featuring Stevenson, poet Dave Puller, and cultural historian Paul Long, the three discussed the series and its depictions of the British working class. Professor Long rated the series positively, praising it as a "great representation of interesting working-class protagonists". Puller had mixed feelings; he was disappointed that the show chose to focus on Eden's fictional romance with Tommy Shelby, rather than her real achievements as a communist and trade union leader.

== Personal and family life ==
Eden was married twice. Her first marriage was brief: she married Albert Eden in 1923 but quickly broke up with him, citing his differing political views. During this short marriage, the couple adopted 2 sons (brothers) called Stephen and Douglas (Douggie to friends), who later joined the Royal Navy, and became a lifelong communist party member until he died in 1977. After his death, various members of the Eden family spoke of him as being a blood relative, and said that Douglas had lived his entire life never knowing that he was not Jessie Eden's biological son.

In 1948, Eden married fellow communist party activist Walter McCulloch, and they stayed together until his death in 1978. McCulloch was a carpenter and CPGB member who oversaw the construction of the communist party's Star Social Club for the Midlands branch.

Eden died in Birmingham on 27 September 1986. She was 84.

== See also ==
- Claudia Jones
- Dorothy Kuya
- Mark Ashton
- Harry Pollitt
- Shapurji Saklatvala
- Alan Winnington
