= Charlie Murphy (actress) =

Irish actress (born 1988)

- Born: Charlotte Murphy; 1988 (age 38); Enniscorthy, County Wexford, Ireland
- Occupation: Actress
- Years active: 2009–present
- Children: 1

Charlotte Murphy (born 1988) is an Irish actress, best known for her roles as Ann Gallagher in the BBC series Happy Valley (2014–2023), Siobhán Delaney in RTÉ’s Love/Hate (2010-2014), as Queen Iseult in the BBC series The Last Kingdom and as Jessie Eden in the BBC series Peaky Blinders (2017–2019).

== Early life and education ==
Murphy was born in Enniscorthy, the daughter of hair salon owners Brenda and Pat Murphy. She has five siblings. The family moved to Wexford when she was 12 years old. She trained at the Gaiety School of Acting from 2006 to 2008.

== Career ==
Murphy has worked across theatre, television and film. She performed the role of Siobhán Delaney in the RTÉ drama series Love/Hate, for which she won Best TV Actress at the 2013 Irish Film and Television Awards (IFTAs), and the renamed Best Actress in a Lead Role at the 2015 IFTAs. She won again at the 2017 IFTAs, taking the award for Best Actress in a Supporting Role, for her performance as Ann Gallagher in the BBC One drama series Happy Valley, and won the same award at the 2018 IFTAs, for her performance as Jessie Eden in the BBC One historical crime drama series Peaky Blinders.

In 2012, she won the Irish Times Irish Theatre Award for her performance of Eliza Doolittle in a production of Pygmalion at the Abbey Theatre. She was nominated for Best Actress in a Play at the 2019 WhatsOnStage Awards for her performance as Mairead in The Lieutenant of Inishmore by Martin McDonagh, directed by Michael Grandage.

== Personal life ==
As of March 2021, Murphy was in a relationship with British theatre and film director Sam Yates. In June 2025, after previous rounds of IVF procedures, the couple welcomed their first child together.

== Acting credits ==
=== Film ===
Year	Title	Role	Notes
2013	Philomena	Kathleen	
2014	'71	Brigid	
2014	Northmen: A Viking Saga	Inghean	
2017	The Foreigner	Maggie Dunn / Sara McKay	
2019	The Corrupted	DS Gemma Connelly	
2019	Dark Lies the Island	Sarah	
2020	The Winter Lake	Elaine	
2021	Creation Stories	Kate Holmes	
2024	Joy	Trisha Johnson	
2026	Ebenezer	Emily Cratchit	

=== Television ===
Year	Title	Role	Notes
2009	The Clinic	Natasha Halpin	Episode #7.3
2010	Single-Handed	Mairead O'Sullivan	3 episodes
2010–2014	Love/Hate	Siobhan Delaney	Main role
2012	Misfits	Grace	Episode #4.5
2013	Ripper Street	Evelyn Foley	Episode: "Dynamite and a Woman"
2013–2014	The Village	Martha Lane / Martha Allingham	Main role
2014	Quirke	Deirdre Hunt	Miniseries; episode: "The Silver Swan"
2014–2023	Happy Valley	Ann Gallagher	Main role
2015	The Last Kingdom	Iseult	3 episodes
2016	Rebellion	Elizabeth Butler	Miniseries; 5 episodes
2016	To Walk Invisible	Anne Brontë	Television film
2017–2019	Peaky Blinders	Jessie Eden	8 episodes
2022	Deadline	Natalie	4 episodes
2022	The Capture	Simone Turner	6 episodes
2022–2024	Halo	Makee	Main role
2023	Obsession	Anna Barton	Main role, 4 episodes
2025	Atomic	Laetitia	Supporting role
2025	Safe Harbor	Sloane	Main role

=== Theatre ===
Year	Title	Role	Notes
2010	4:48 Psychosis by Sarah Kane	Woman	Granary Theatre, Cork
2010	The Taming of the Shrew by William Shakespeare	Bianca	Shakespeare in the Park
2011	The Seagull by Anton Chekhov	Nina	Loose Canon
2011	This Is Our Youth by Kenneth Lonergan	Jessica	Director Jimmy Fay
2011	The Silver Tassie by Sean O'Casey	Jessie Taite	Director Garry Hynes, Druid Theatre Company, Lincoln Centre, New York
2011	Big Maggie by John B. Keane	Katie	Director Garry Hynes, Druid Theatre Company
2011	Pygmalion by George Bernard Shaw	Eliza Doolittle	Director Andrea Ainsworth, Abbey Theatre; Irish Times Theatre Award for Best Actress
2011	Disco Pigs by Enda Walsh	Runt	Director Cathal Cleary, Young Vic Theatre
2014	Our Few and Evil Days by Mark O'Rowe	Adele	Director Mark O'Rowe, Abbey Theatre
2016	Arlington by Enda Walsh	Isla	Director Enda Walsh, Black Box Theatre, Galway International Arts Festival
2017	Arlington by Enda Walsh	Isla	Director Enda Walsh, St Ann's Warehouse, New York
2018	The Lieutenant of Inishmore by Martin McDonagh	Mairead	Director Michael Grandage, Noël Coward Theatre

== Awards and nominations ==
=== Film and TV ===
Year	Award	Category	Work	Result
2013	Irish Film and Television Awards	Best TV Actress	Love/Hate	Won
2015	Irish Film and Television Awards	Best Actress in a Lead Role, Television Drama	Love/Hate	Won
2017	Irish Film and Television Awards	Best Actress in a Supporting Role, Television Drama	Happy Valley	Won
2018	Irish Film and Television Awards	Best Actress in a Supporting Role, Television Drama	Peaky Blinders	Won

=== Theatre ===
Year	Award	Category	Work	Result
2011	Irish Times Theatre Awards	Best Actress in a Leading Role	Eliza Doolittle in Pygmalion by George Bernard Shaw at the Abbey Theatre	Won
2019	WhatsOnStage Awards	Best Actress in a Play	Maraid in The Lieutenant of Inishmore by Martin McDonagh directed by Michael Grandage	Nominated

== See also ==
- List of Irish actors
