= Deadline (2022 TV series) =

- Country of origin: United Kingdom
- Original language: English
- No. of series: 1
- No. of episodes: 4

Original release
- Network: Channel 5
- Release: 5 April – 8 April 2022

Deadline is a British four-part mystery drama miniseries, aired on Channel 5 during April 2022. A jaded journalist (James D'Arcy) becomes fascinated by an enigmatic young widow (Charlie Murphy), who is widely suspected of having killed her rich husband, and works to solve the case.
