= Tommy Shelby =

Thomas Shelby OBE DCM MM MP
- Peaky Blinders character
- Cillian Murphy as Thomas Shelby in a promotional image for Peaky Blinders' second series
- First appearance: "Episode 1" (2013)
- Last appearance: Peaky Blinders: The Immortal Man (2026)
- Created by: Steven Knight
- Portrayed by: Cillian Murphy

In-universe information
- Full name: Thomas Michael Shelby
- Nicknames: Tommy; Tom; Thomas; Mr. Shelby; The Devil
- Gender: Male
- Title(s): Member of Parliament; King of the Gypsies
- Occupation: Politician; gangster; businessman; soldier (formerly)
- Affiliation: Peaky Blinders; Labour Party; British Union of Fascists (undercover)
- Family: Elizabeth "Polly" Gray (aunt; deceased); Arthur Shelby Sr. (father; deceased); Michael Gray (cousin; deceased); Arthur Shelby (brother; deceased); John Shelby (brother; deceased); Finn Shelby (brother); Ada Shelby Thorne (sister; deceased); Freddie Thorne (brother in-law; deceased)
- Spouses: Grace Burgess (m. 1924; death 1924) Lizzie Stark (m. 1926; sep. 1934)
- Significant others: May Carleton (1921–1922); Princess Tatiana Petrovna (1924); Jessie Eden (1925–1926); Diana Mitford (1933–1934)
- Children: Erasmus "Duke" Shelby Charles Shelby Ruby Shelby
- Origin: Small Heath, Birmingham
- Nationality: British
- Military career
- Allegiance: United Kingdom
- Branch: British Army
- Service years: 1914–1918
- Rank: Sergeant Major
- Unit: Birmingham Rifles
- Conflicts: First World War: Battle of the Somme
- Awards: Distinguished Conduct Medal; Military Medal

Thomas Michael Shelby OBE DCM MM is a fictional character and the main protagonist of the British period crime drama Peaky Blinders. He is played by Irish actor Cillian Murphy, who has won two Irish Film & Television Awards and two National Television Awards for his portrayal of Shelby. The character has received critical acclaim.

Director Steven Knight cast Cillian Murphy for the role of Tommy Shelby. The character is introduced as a First World War veteran from a family with Romani ancestry, whose criminal enterprise is centred in Birmingham. The narrative begins in 1919, and largely revolves around Shelby's romance with Grace Burgess and his conflict with Inspector Campbell. As the series progresses, Shelby's relationship with mob boss Alfie Solomons is a key element in many of the storylines.

== Casting and background ==
Cillian Murphy had expressed an interest in doing more television roles, "Those iconic American shows had been on and we watched them and everyone was kind of conscious of that. I think the BBC were conscious of that and so I was keen to read some good scripts and they [Peaky Blinders] were the first TV scripts I got sent". Murphy admitted that he was not aware of who the Peaky Blinders were when he was initially presented with the script.

Jason Statham was initially preferred for the role by director Steven Knight, who explains "I met them both in LA to talk about the role and opted for Jason. [...] Cillian, when you meet him, isn't Tommy, obviously, but I was stupid enough not to understand that". Knight then opted to cast Murphy instead after receiving a text message from Murphy that read "Remember, I'm an actor".

Although many characters in the series are based on real-life historical figures, most of the Peaky Blinders are entirely fictional and were created by Knight. Tommy Shelby is from a Romani family based in Birmingham. Murphy spent time with Romani people to prepare himself for the role. Shelby is a veteran of the First World War and has post-traumatic stress disorder as a result of his experiences during the war; something that is a recurring theme throughout the series. Shelby sports an undercut hairstyle and this has led to a resurgence in its popularity.

== Fictional biography ==
=== Early life ===
Thomas Michael Shelby was born in Birmingham, England, around 1890 to an Irish Traveller and Romani family. Arthur Jnr was the oldest of the 5 siblings born in 1887. He grew up in the Small Heath neighbourhood of Birmingham. Thomas was the second of 5 children of Arthur Shelby Sr and Mrs Shelby. He dated Greta Jurossi, a woman of Italian descent during his 20s, but she died of tuberculosis. His experiences as a sergeant major during the First World War have resulted in him suffering from PTSD and it is implied he returned from it as a changed man.

=== Storylines ===
==== Series 1 ====
In 1919, Tommy leads the Peaky Blinders into appropriating a consignment of guns from the Birmingham Small Arms factory. Inspector Campbell (Sam Neill) is tasked by Winston Churchill (Andy Nyman) to find the guns and, unbeknownst to Tommy, his new barmaid Grace Burgess (Annabelle Wallis) is working undercover for Inspector Campbell. Tommy is involved with fixing horse races, which has potential for conflict with Billy Kimber (Charlie Creed-Miles), who runs the races.

Inspector Campbell instructs Grace to get close to Tommy so that he can find the location of the guns. Grace attends the Cheltenham races as Tommy's date. Tommy saves Grace from harm after initially offering her to Kimber, as part of a deal for the Peaky Blinders to become the security at Kimber's establishment. Tommy obtains a betting licence for his business and hires Grace as his brother Arthur Shelby's (Paul Anderson) secretary at the Garrison, which the Peaky Blinders own. Tommy and Grace become romantically involved. Grace tells Inspector Campbell, if she gives him the location of the guns, he has to leave Tommy and his family alone. Grace gives up the location to Inspector Campbell and resigns service to the crown.

As she has resigned, and the guns found, with the exception of one, Inspector Campbell proposes marriage, which Grace rejects because she is in love with Thomas. Tommy gathers the Peaky Blinders and another family, the Lees, and they take on Kimber's men. This leads to a confrontation where Tommy shoots Kimber dead. Tommy meets Grace and she tells him she loves him and will go to London for a few days. Tommy meets with his aunt Polly Gray (Helen McCrory) and she informs him that Grace is the reason Inspector Campbell found the guns. The series ends with a gunshot as Inspector Campbell confronts Grace at the railway station.

==== Series 2 ====
Grace is revealed to have shot Inspector Campbell, but Inspector Campbell survives. Tommy, Arthur and their brother John Shelby (Joe Cole) decide to get familiar with the London scene and start a fight at Darby Sabini's (Noah Taylor) club. In retaliation, Sabini has his thugs kidnap and attempt to rape Tommy's sister Ada Thorne (Sophie Rundle), as well as beat Tommy up. Inspector Campbell intervenes before Sabini and his men can finish him off. Inspector Campbell has agreed with Churchill (Richard McCabe) that Tommy will be useful to them.

Tommy discharges himself from hospital early and takes a barge down to London. Tommy meets with gang leader Alfie Solomons (Tom Hardy) there. Tommy has a hard time convincing Alfie that he should align with the Peaky Blinders against Sabini. Tommy and John meet with Billy Kitchen (Paul Bullion), of the Black Country Boys, who fought with them in the war. Tommy tells Billy to round up his men for them to go to work in Camden Town for Alfie. Tommy becomes romantically involved with horse trainer May Carleton (Charlotte Riley).

Alfie and Sabini meet and form an alliance against the Peaky Blinders. Alfie deceives Arthur and has him sent to prison. Tommy finds his fledgling empire crumbling before him, as his power-base in London is obliterated. Tommy further complicates his love life, by escorting the returning Grace to a passionate date, though still stringing May along, who had earlier expressed her feelings for him. Tommy attempts to end his romantic relationship with May, though he still wants her to continue training his horse. Alfie gets Arthur out of prison. Derby Day then arrives.

Tommy collects the Peaky Blinders and gives them their mission at the races. Without firing a shot, they are to collect and burn the licences of Sabini's bookies and steal the bets. Tommy runs into Grace who informs him she's pregnant. Tommy tells her after the race, they will talk. Inspector Campbell's men from Northern Ireland, members of the Ulster Volunteers, kidnap Tommy and take him to an empty field, while Polly meets with Inspector Campbell and shoots him. Tommy is let go with a message from Churchill promising future contact.

==== Series 3 ====
Two years later, in 1924, Tommy and Grace get married. Meanwhile, a refugee from Russia, named Anton Kaledin (Richard Brake), makes contact with the Peaky Blinders, offering the code "Constantine" as confirmation for the money-exchange meeting with Grand Duchess Tatiana Petrovna (Gaite Jansen). Tommy informs her that Kaledin provided the wrong code name, meaning the man must be killed. In the end, Arthur kills the impostor. Tommy inspects armoured vehicles for a business deal with Father John Hughes (Paddy Considine).

He meets with Mr. Romanov, who pays him for murdering Kaledin with a sapphire. Tommy later finds a card under his son Charles' pillow, which reads "Charles Shelby – R.I.P.". Grace wears the sapphire, which Tommy gave her, to the Shelby Charity Foundation dinner. Father Hughes informs Tommy that the Russians want to inspect the vehicles. Tatiana tells Tommy that the sapphire Grace is wearing was cursed. Tommy attempts convincing Grace to take off the necklace when a man shouts "For Angel!" and shoots Grace dead. Tommy travels to Wales with the sapphire necklace, where he confers with a Romani woman named Bethany Boswell, who he asks whether it is cursed.

He returns home with some sense of normality having left the necklace with Boswell. Arthur and John have procured a man called Vicente Changretta (Kenneth Colley), an Italian American Mafia member who Tommy threatens to torture, but Arthur shoots him in the head as an act of mercy. Tatiana sees Tommy to his car; he tells her that Father Hughes is betraying them to the Soviets and offers to kill him for free. Easter arrives and Tommy announces a plan to Arthur and John: they will have been hired to provide the Russians with weapons for a rebellion stolen from a train and will be paid in jewels, but believing the Russians will betray him, Tommy plans to break into their vault.

Polly goes to church while drunk and during confession she inadvertently reveals Tommy's plan to assassinate Father Hughes to the priest, who tells Father Hughes about it. Knowing he is the target, Father Hughes foils Tommy's attempt on his life, and watches him being seriously injured by his minders. Father Hughes then makes Tommy go tell the Russians that he was misinformed about Father Hughes betraying them. Three months later, Tommy has recovered and the planned massive heist involving the Russians is drawing near. Tommy enlists Alfie to appraise the Russian's jewels.

Charles is kidnapped. Father Hughes reveals to Tommy that he knows about his subterfuge. He demands the jewels as payment and for Tommy himself to blow up the train, which must kill six people, in exchange for the safe return of Charles. Tommy agrees unconditionally. After some investigation he discovers that Alfie divulged the plans to Father Hughes. During a confrontation, Polly's son Michael Gray (Finn Cole) kills Alfie's associate. Michael talks Tommy out of killing Alfie.

Tommy figures out where Charles is being held and sends Michael to retrieve him and kill Father Hughes. At the same time Arthur and John set off to carry out the train bombing in case Michael cannot rescue Charles in time. Even though Michael is successful, word does not reach the family in time, and the train is blown up. Tommy returns home to distribute the loot to his accomplices. At the end of the meeting he announces that the police are at the residence to arrest everyone. The rest of the Peaky Blinders and the family are taken away in handcuffs.

==== Series 4 ====
As Arthur, John, Michael and Polly prepare to hang for their crimes, Tommy's reprieve comes just in time to save their lives. A year later, the family is scattered and estranged from one another. Each of the Shelbys receives a letter from Vicente's son Luca Changretta (Adrien Brody), a leader in New York's Italian American Mafia, marking him or her for death in retribution for the murder of Vicente and Changretta's brother Angel. Tommy and Ada attempt to convince the others to meet on Boxing Day, believing that they will be safer if they come back together. When Tommy discovers and kills a mafia agent among his staff, he realises the assassination attempts are due to take place on Christmas Day and gets word to the rest of the family.

Michael goes to collect John and his wife Esme Shelby (Aimee-Ffion Edwards), with whom Tommy could not get in contact. A cart pulls up, and John and Michael are shot several times. Michael survives his injuries but John is killed. In the wake of his death, Tommy who is deepened by John's death, so as the rest of the family, agree to put their differences aside while they deal with the mafia threat. Tommy suggests contacting Aberama Gold (Aidan Gillen), a contract killer. Changretta visits Tommy in his office at the factory by using a fake name to get into the factory. Tommy goes to his jacket to grab his gun and shoots Changretta, but Changretta already took the bullets out and sets them on the table, stating that each is for a member of the family. He plans to keep Tommy alive until the rest are dead, but insists that their vendetta be an honourable one, with Tommy agreeing not to involve the police or the death of children or civilians.

The Peaky Blinders are lured by the Changrettas into a chase on the streets of Birmingham, where it becomes clear that the Changrettas are outmatched. Tommy has figured out Polly and Michael have betrayed him, but goes to the meeting Polly has set for him, and finds himself engaged in a shootout with Changretta's men. After Tommy kills Changretta's men, he confronts Changretta, but the police arrive and break up the fight. The family gather to find out what happened. Tommy explains what happened. It appears he had been in on it with Polly, but he does not tell the family of Michael's betrayal.

Alfie arranges a boxing match between Aberama Gold's son Bonnie Gold (Jack Rowan) and Alfie's protégé. It is a trap, as Alfie has made a deal to let the Changrettas kill the Peaky Blinders, in exchange for the Changrettas to transport and sell Alfie's London-made bootleg liquor in New York. At the day of the match, Arthur is seriously wounded and appears to have died. Luckily, Tommy finds Arthur in time to save his life, but tells Polly to inform everyone but Linda that he has died, as a part of Tommy's elaborate plan. At Arthur's funeral, the widow Changretta approaches with a white flag.

Later at the family home, she reveals the vendetta will be over if Tommy signs over all his assets to Changretta. Changretta and his men meet with the remaining Shelbys in Tommy's basement distillery to sign the documents. Tommy reveals to Changretta that he has sent Michael to America to negotiate with Al Capone and turn Changretta's men against him. Realising he has been outmanoeuvred, Changretta attacks Tommy, and a fight ensues. As Tommy is getting the upper hand, Arthur enters the distillery and shoots Changretta. It is revealed that Tommy had Arthur fake his death to lure Changretta into the trap.

The family celebrate the end of the vendetta at Tommy's countryside estate, and it is announced that Tommy will take a holiday from the business. Tommy confronts Alfie for his betrayal, who reveals he did so knowing Tommy would track him down and kill him, and that he has cancer. Tommy then shoots Alfie and proceeds to take his holiday. During the holiday, Tommy continues to sleep with Lizzie Stark (Natasha O'Keeffe). Lizzie previously announced her pregnancy with Tommy's child at the boxing match. When he returns, he starts a campaign for Member of Parliament, an election which Tommy wins.

==== Series 5 ====
In 1929, Tommy goes up to a phone booth on Lickey Hills, where on the phone Arthur reads a letter from "Angels of Retribution", which states that they have never even heard of the Peaky Blinders and therefore are not scared of their threats. Meanwhile, Michael, who runs the Shelby company in the United States, gets a message that the US stock market has crashed and leaves for Birmingham with his wife Gina Gray (Anya Taylor-Joy). Tommy gets the news from Arthur about the Stock Market crash and becomes furious after learning that Michael held on even after being instructed not to do so. It is revealed that Tommy is now married to Lizzie. Later, the family have a meeting at the Garrison, where Tommy reveals that Aberama and Isaiah Jesus (Daryl McCormack) were sent to kill a pimp, who was blackmailing a senior member of House of Lords.

During the assassination mission, Tommy's younger brother Finn Shelby (Harry Kirton) was shot in the arm, even though he was instructed by Tommy to stay back and let the other two men do the killing. At the House of Commons, Tommy meets Sir Oswald Mosley (Sam Claflin). Tommy later threatens Lord Suckerby (Tim Woodward), a senior member who was being threatened, for not being paid the amount he was promised. Mr. Levitt (Elliot Cowan), a journalist, conducts an interview with Tommy and asks him questions about his past, with a view to damaging his image as MP, but Tommy outmanoeuvres him with personal and sensitive information he has on him. At the end of the episode, Mr. Levitt is killed by unknown assailants. At his mansion, Tommy gets a call from Captain Swing (Charlene McKenna), who informs that she captured Michael from a cabin of the men who supposedly wants to kill Tommy, and asks whether to spare him or kill him. As per Tommy's request, Michael walks free.

At the Garrison, Arthur and Tommy warn Finn not to get involved with guns. Tommy tells Arthur that he doesn't sleep because he dreams that someone wants his crown and that it might be Michael. Tommy and Ada meets with Mosley. Tommy tells Mosley that Ada advised against meeting him, as he seems to be moving in direction of fascism. At a ballet event, Mosley announces to everyone his and Tommy's involvement in the new British fascism movement. Tommy visits an asylum to meet Barney Thomason (Cosmo Jarvis), an old comrade from the First World War. Barney agrees to join the Peaky Blinders, and Tommy plans to have him assassinate Mosley.

Tommy visits Alfie, who survived being shot by Tommy, to organise a riot to cover up the assassination of Mosley. The plan to assassinate Mosley is foiled and both Barney and Aberama are killed in the ensuing events. Tommy leaves for home with Arthur and walks off into a field. A hallucination of Grace tells him "the work's all done" and Tommy screams and points a gun at his own head.

==== Series 6 ====
Following Tommy's suicide attempt, he receives a call from Captain Swing, who takes credit for foiling the attempted assassination of Mosley. She returns the bodies of Barney, Aberama Gold and Polly Gray, who was assassinated by the IRA. The entire Shelby family gather for Polly's funeral, with Michael swearing revenge on Tommy for his role in Polly's death. In 1933, Tommy, now sober, sets up a meeting with an estranged Michael, and business associates of Jack Nelson (James Frecheville), a south Boston gang leader and Gina's uncle on Miquelon Island. Following unsuccessful talks to re-enter into business, Tommy lands Michael in prison for possession of opium.

Later, Tommy is phoned by Lizzie who announces she, Charles (Billy Jenkins) and Ruby (Orla McDonagh) cannot travel to Canada due to Ruby's sudden illness. Believing her sickness is a message and gypsy related, Tommy decides to return to Britain. Tommy, still a Labour MP, returns to the United Kingdom and is informed Ruby is recovering. He has a seizure in the bathroom and Lizzie urges him to see a doctor, but he refuses. While on a diplomatic mission for President Franklin D. Roosevelt, Nelson expresses an interest to meet the fascists. Tommy sees an opportunity to ally himself with Captain Swing. He visits Alfie and announces the death of his uncle at the Cotton Club at the hands of Nelson's gang.

After a tense meeting with Mosley and his fiancé Lady Diana Mitford (Amber Anderson), Tommy meets Nelson and agrees to feed information about England's political goings to his gang in exchange for opium. Tommy is informed that Ruby is sick again and decides to contact Esme. As Ruby falls sick with consumption and treated with gold flakes, Tommy goes in search of the source of the curse that he believes has been laid upon his family, and eventually reunites with Esme. Ada takes over Tommy's role in Birmingham. Tommy discovers that Bethany Boswell had given the cursed sapphire that once belonged to Grace, who died after Tommy gifted it to her, to Evadne Barwell, who had a daughter that died at the age of 7, prompting Tommy to believe that it was Barwell who had cursed Ruby in revenge.

Tommy returns to Birmingham and goes straight to the hospital where Ruby is. Lizzie meets him at the entrance to tell him that the gold salts treatment didn't work, and that Ruby had died. As the family mourns, Tommy enacts revenge, as he murders the Barwell family who cursed Ruby. Distraught in grief, Tommy ignores letters from his personal doctor as his relationship with Lizzie strains even further. The meeting between Tommy, Mosley, Diana, Captain Swing and Nelson takes place: Nelson agrees to let Tommy trade opium in Boston as he gains information from Mosley about the political future of England, and agrees with Captain Swing that the Irish working class can be turned.

Tommy meets with Doctor Holford (Aneurin Barnard) and is told that due to coming into contact with Ruby while she was ill, he has developed inoperable tuberculoma and that he now only has between 12 and 18 months left to live. Tommy deals with the Chinese business that got Arthur hooked on opium by walking into their shop, taking their remaining drugs and throwing them into the canal with a bomb. He introduces his newly found son, Erasmus "Duke" Shelby (Conrad Khan), at a family meeting, to Lizzie's disliking. Tommy sleeps with Diana as a payment for her cause. She arrives at the family home with Mosley, and tells Lizzie that Tommy was disloyal to her, in an act purely devised to split her and Tommy away from each other, with Mosley believing that Tommy deserves better if he is to move up in the world.

Lizzie leaves Tommy after his affair with Diana, taking Charles. Tommy sets the rest of the Peaky Blinders to dismantle his house, and gives false information to the informant Billy Grade (Emmett J. Scanlan) to lure the IRA into a trap. On Miquelon Island, Tommy meets Michael, who has been released from prison. His friend Johnny Dogs (Packy Lee) switches a car-bomb intended for Tommy, which after the meeting kills Michael's associates. Tommy then kills Michael, fulfilling Polly's prediction.

With Nelson's business partners defeated, Alfie and Tommy agree to coordinate a take-over of his business in Boston, with Alfie staying in America permanently to oversee operations. A month after saying goodbye to his family, an alone Tommy prepares to shoot himself. But after seeing a vision of Ruby, and Doctor Holford pictured with Mosley in a partially-burnt newspaper, Tommy realises he had been given a false diagnosis of inoperable tuberculoma. Tommy goes off to kill Holford, but realises he has finally changed and ends up sparing his life. After returning and watching his wagon and remaining possessions burn, Tommy rides away.

==== The Immortal Man ====
See also: The Immortal Man

== Critical reception ==
For his portrayal of Tommy Shelby, Cillian Murphy has received widespread critical acclaim and won the Irish Film & Television Academy for Best Actor in a Lead Role in Drama in 2017 and 2018. In 2020, Murphy was awarded a National Television Award for Best Drama Performance for the same role, beating the likes of Jodie Comer and Idris Elba to the award, and went on to win again in 2022.

Emily St. James praised the character, "to call Murphy magnetic might be underselling his presence, and even though the rest of Blinders is quite good, the show can't help but sag a little whenever Murphy's not around." Morgan Jeffery praises the 'movie-star charisma' of the character while Maureen Ryan says "Tommy Shelby may not be a good man, but he's a phenomenally watchable one."
