= Graham Stevenson (trade union leader) =

British communist, writer and trade unionist (1950–2020)

- Born: 28 October 1950; Keresley, Coventry, England
- Died: 1 May 2020 (aged 69)
- Known for: Biographies of British communist and trade union activists
- Notable work: The Encyclopedia of Communist Biographies (website)
- Political party: Communist Party of Great Britain (CPGB); Communist Party of Britain (CPB)
- Children: 2
- Awards: ITF Gold Badge (2011)

Graham Stevenson (28 October 1950 – 1 May 2020) was a British communist, trade union leader, and writer who specialised in British socialist and labour activist biographies. He was one of the most influential trade union leaders in Britain, becoming the national secretary of the TGWU in 1999. As a founder and later president in 2009 of the European Transport Union Federation, he helped organise strikes across European docks in 2003, forcing the European Union to stall privatisation plans. Between 2007 and 2008, Stevenson played a key part in the negotiations that formed Unite the Union, the largest trade union in the United Kingdom. He also served on the Executive and Political Committee of the Communist Party of Britain (CPB), and served as the treasurer of the Marx Memorial Library from 2013 to 2019.

He is the biographer of Jessie Eden, among many other British communist icons.

== Early life ==
Graham Stevenson was born on 28 October 1950 in the mining village of Keresley near Coventry, England. Born into a working class family, his mother worked as a textile worker and his father was an engineer and a lifelong trade unionist who worked with the Amalgamated Engineering Union. Stevenson won a scholarship to the King Henry VIII School, a strongly conservative institution. He often argued with the other members of the school over political debates, reading Labour Research and buying the Daily Worker with his lunch money to back his arguments. He became interested in James Klugmann's writings on Christian Marxism, and by the age of 15 he was getting into trouble with right-wing teachers over political debates. Stevenson left school at the age of 16.

On request, his family gifted him Christmas books on socialism, including Nikolai Bukharin's book The ABC of Communism and Joan Robinson's book Economic Philosophy. During the late 1960s Stevenson had become a member of the Communist Party of Great Britain (CPGB) and their youth wing the Young Communist League, successfully reviving the previously deflated YCL branch in Coventry.

== Adult life ==
By 1970, Stevenson had become the Secretary of the Coventry Trades Council Youth Committee, and by 1971 he was a member of the Coventry Communist Party City Committee. In 1972 he became a member of the Midlands District Committee, while also holding national leadership positions in the YCL.

=== Rotunda legal case ===
In 1973 Stevenson joined the UCATT construction union, and alongside fellow communist Pete Carter they worked together to unionise building sites in Coventry. In one instance, Stevenson clashed with the manager of a building site during an attempted occupation that led to the famous Rotunda legal case. Many months after the attempted occupation, Stevenson and his colleagues were arrested by the police and charged with 'conspiracy to trespass', with potentially unlimited penalties. However, the jury at their trial was led by a sympathetic local union convener, and the jury found Stevenson innocent.

=== Trade union activism in Birmingham and Derby ===
Stevenson worked very closely with trade union leader and communist Frank Watters, who was famous for his trade union activism with the National Union of Mineworkers (NUM) in Yorkshire. Together they redeveloped the Birmingham CPGB Communist Party premises into a social club, heavily featuring Jamaican Reggae music. This social club became a home for many members of Birmingham's black communities, including the future general secretary of the TGWU, Bill Morris. Stevenson met Frank Watters's daughter Lesley, and married her in 1979. In 1980 Stevenson began his career as a full-time trade union officer, applying for the position of TGWU district organiser in Derby, where he successfully re-unionised bus services and expanded the union's activities into the wider community. He was also involved in re-establishing the Campaign for Nuclear Disarmament (CND). In 1982 he became the organiser of the Midlands March for Jobs in 1982. In 1983-84 he worked to ensure that transport workers gave their full support to striking mining workers.

=== TGWU and European leadership ===
In 1999 Stevenson became the National Secretary for the Transport and General Workers' Union (TGWU), one of the largest trade unions in British history. In this capacity he also played a leading role in the founding and running of the European Transport Workers Federation, a union with 2 million members. As the new vice-president of the European Transport Workers Federation, he helped organise dock worker strikes across Europe in January 2003, forcing the European Union to abandon the commission's Directive to seek privatisation. As a leading member of the TGWU, he worked to ensure the union opposed the 2003 invasion of Iraq.

=== Later life ===
In 2007–2008 Stevenson played a key role in creating Unite the Union, the largest trade union in the UK. After retiring from Unite in 2010, Stevenson dedicated the rest of his life to supporting the British communist movement. He served as the treasurer of the Marx Memorial Library between 2013 and 2019, an organisation known for housing the records of many anti-colonial fighters. In 2011 Stevenson was awarded the ITF Gold Badge. In 2017 Stevenson ran for the Mayor of Birmingham, receiving just under 6,000 votes.

After the disbanding of the original Communist Party of Great Britain (CPGB), Stevenson joined the new Communist Party of Britain (CPB) and became served the party as a leading member. He also had a daily column in the Morning Star and redeveloped the CPB's Communist Party History Group.

== Death ==
Stevenson died of cancer on 1 May 2020 at the age of 69.

ITF President Paddy Crumlin praised Stevenson's legacy:

"He was a trade unionist to his bones and lived a life of campaigning, organising and mass mobilisation in the defence of social and community values, including the fight against privatisation, industrial deregulation and discrimination in any form, but particularly on the basis of gender, age and ethnicity. Comrade Stevenson was a communist in the true sense of the defined word."

Mac Urata, the senior policy officer of the International Transport Workers Federation, also praised Stevenson's legacy as a trade union leader:

" He held a very senior position in the ITF, but the rest of responsibilities that his union had in the ITF, he shared with his elected officials, members and staff — something that not all of us can do, but I firmly believe that it made the ITF strong, and we owe him a huge appreciation."

Trade union offices
Preceded by Cliff Twort	National Secretary of the Passenger Services Group of the Transport and General Workers' Union; 1990–2007	Succeeded by Union merged
