= Peaky Blinders =

Criminal gang in Birmingham, England (1880s – 1920s)

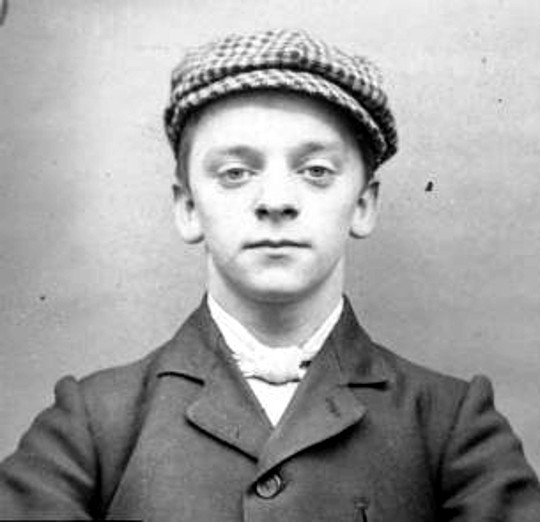
- Harry Fowles, a member of the gang in 1904, sporting the signature overcoat and flat cap
- Founded: Late 1880s, widely accepted as 1887.
- Founding location: Small Heath, Birmingham, England
- Years active: 1880s to 1920s
- Territory: Primarily the West Midlands of England
- Ethnicity: English
- Membership (est.): c. 1,000; membership fluctuated widely with alliances and joined forces
- Criminal activities: Bookmaking, assault, extortion, fraud, murder, rape, fencing, hooliganism, bribery, smuggling, hijacking and robbery
- Rivals: Sabinis; Birmingham Boys; the Sloggers

The Peaky Blinders were a street gang based in Birmingham, England, which operated from the 1880s until the 1920s. The group consisted largely of young criminals from lower- to working-class backgrounds. They engaged in robbery, violence, racketeering, illegal bookmaking, and control of gambling. By the 20th century, members wore signature outfits that typically included tailored jackets, lapelled overcoats, buttoned waistcoats, silk scarves, bell-bottom trousers, leather boots, and flat caps.

The Blinders' dominance came about from beating rivals, including the "Sloggers", "a pugilistic term for someone who could strike a heavy blow in the ring", whom they fought for territory in Birmingham and its surrounding districts. They held "control" for 30 years until 1920, when a larger gang, the Birmingham Boys, led by Billy Kimber, overtook them. Although they had disappeared by the 1920s, the name "Peaky Blinders" became synonymous slang for any street gang in Birmingham.

In 2013, the name was reused for a BBC Television series entitled Peaky Blinders. The series, which stars Cillian Murphy, Paul Anderson, Helen McCrory, Sophie Rundle and Joe Cole, is a crime story about a fictional crime family operating in Birmingham just after World War I.

== Etymology ==
It was introduced a few years ago ... to describe that section of the rough element which, while the hard felt hat was in vogue amongst them, distinguished themselves by shaping a portion of the rim, by pulling the hat over the knee, into a peaky form. The hat was then worn low down over the left eye, displaying on the exposed forehead, on the right, a lock of hair (the only portion of that adornment not closely cropped) known as the 'donkey-fringe.'

— Edwin Smith's Collection of Warwickshire Words (unpublished), quoted in The English Dialect Dictionary (1903)

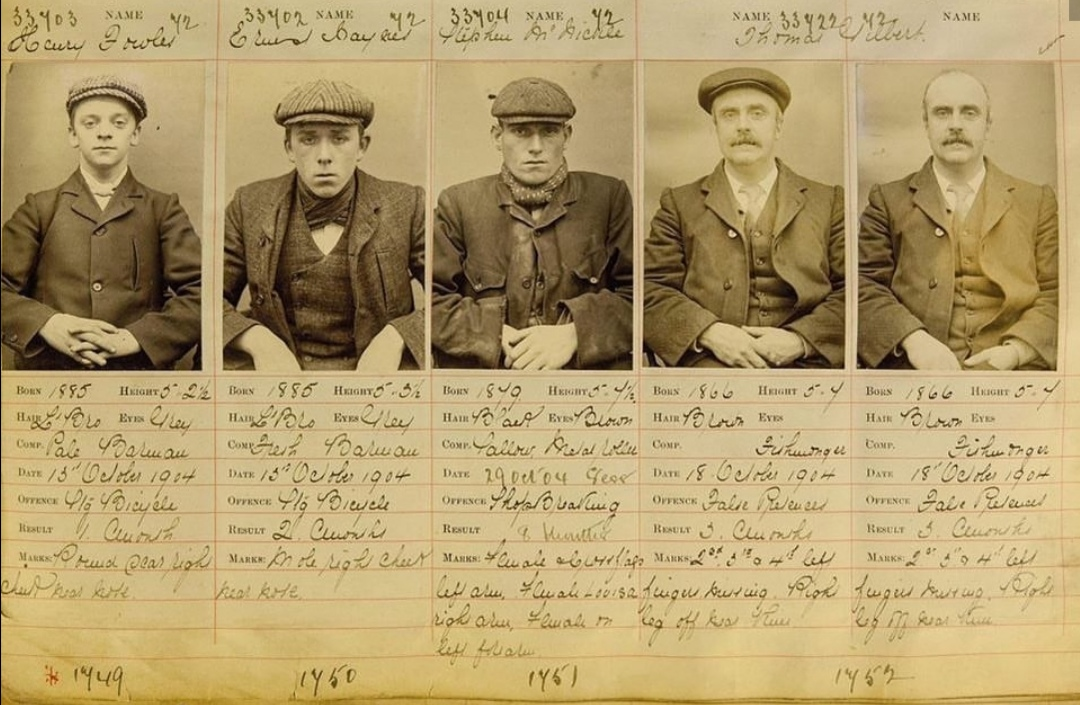
Five police mugshots of four Peaky Blinders in 1904

Birmingham historian Carl Chinn believes the name is a reference to the gang's sartorial elegance. He says the popular usage of "peaky" at the time referred to any flat cap with a peak. "Blinder" was a familiar Birmingham slang term, still used today, to describe something or someone of dapper appearance. A further explanation might be from the gang's own criminal behaviour. They were known to sneak up from behind, then pull the hat peak down over victims' faces so they could not describe who robbed them.

The folk etymology of Peaky Blinder is that the gang members would stitch disposable razor blades into the peaks of their flat caps, which could then be used as weapons. However, as the Gillette company introduced the first replaceable safety razor system in 1903, in the United States, and the first factory manufacturing them in Great Britain opened in 1908, this idea of the origin of the name is apocryphal. British author John Douglas, from Birmingham, said hats were used as weapons in his novel A Walk Down Summer Lane – members with razor blades sewn into their caps would headbutt enemies to potentially blind them, or the caps would be used to slash foreheads, causing blood to pour down into the eyes of their enemies, temporarily blinding them.

== Youth violence ==
Economic hardship in Birmingham led to a violent youth subculture. Poor youths frequently engaged in robbery and pickpocketing of men walking on the streets of slum areas. These efforts were executed through assault, battery, stabbing, and strangling. The origins of this subculture can be traced back to the 1850s, a time when Birmingham's streets were filled with gambling dens and rough sports. When the police started to crack down on these activities due to pressure from the upper classes, the youth fought back, banding together in what became known as slogging gangs. These gangs frequently fought the police, and assaulted members of the public walking in the streets. During the 1890s youth street gangs consisted of boys and men between the ages of 12 and 30. The late 1890s saw the organisation of these men into a hierarchy of soft power.

The most violent of these youth street gangs organised themselves as a singular group known as the Peaky Blinders. They were founded in Small Heath, by a man named Thomas Mucklow, as suggested by a newspaper article entitled, "A murderous outrage at Small Heath, a man's skull fractured", printed in the 24 March 1890 edition of The Birmingham Mail. This article is the earliest evidence of the Peaky Blinders in print:

A serious assault was committed upon a young man named George Eastwood. Living at 3 court, 2 house, Arthur Street, Small Heath, on Saturday night. It seems that Eastwood, who has been for some time a total abstainer, called between ten and eleven o'clock at the Rainbow Public House in Adderly Street, and was supplied with a bottle of gingerbeer. Shortly afterwards several men known as the "Peaky Blinders" gang, whom Eastwood knew by sight from their living in the same neighborhood as himself, came in.

After some gangsters attacked a man in 1890, they sent a letter to various national newspapers declaring themselves as members of this specific group. Their first activities primarily revolved around occupying favourable land, notably the communities of Small Heath and Cheapside, Birmingham. Their expansion was noted by their first gang rival, the Cheapside Sloggers, who battled against them to control land.

After Peaky Blinders established controlled territory in the late 19th century their criminal enterprise began expanding. They diversified into protection rackets, fraud, land grab, smuggling, truck hijacking, robbery, and bookmaking. Historian Heather Shor of the University of Leeds claims that the Blinders were more focused on street fighting, robbery, and protection rackets, as opposed to more organised crime.

The group was known for its violence, not only towards rival gangs, but also against innocent civilians and constables. Gang wars between rival gangs frequently erupted in Birmingham, which led to brawls and shootouts. The Peaky Blinders also deliberately attacked police officers, in what became known as "constable baiting". Constable George Snipe was killed by the gang in 1897, as was Charles Philip Gunter in 1901. Hundreds more were injured, and some left the force because of the violence.

Soon, the term "Peaky Blinder" became a generic term for young street criminals in Birmingham. In 1899, an Irish police chief named Charles Haughton Rafter was contracted to enforce local law in Birmingham. Police corruption and bribery diminished the effectiveness of his enforcement for a time.

=== Notorious members ===
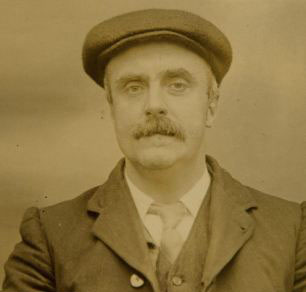
Kevin Mooney (Thomas Gilbert), a powerful member of the gang, in 1904

The most powerful member of the Peaky Blinders was a man known as Kevin Mooney. His real name was Thomas Gilbert, but he routinely changed his last name.

Other prominent members of the gang were David Taylor, Earnest Haynes, Harry Fowles, and Stephen McNickle. Harry Fowles, known as "Baby-faced Harry", was arrested at age 19 for stealing a bicycle in October 1904. McNickle and Haynes were arrested at the same time, for stealing a bicycle and home invasion, respectively. Each were held for one month for their crimes. West Midlands police records described the three arrested as "foul-mouthed young men who stalk the streets in drunken groups, insulting and mugging passers-by". Taylor was arrested at age 13 for carrying a gun.

Many gang members later fought in the First World War. Henry Lightfoot, the first person to be named as a Peaky Blinder, joined the British Army three times in his life and participated in the Battle of the Somme in 1916.

Gangster Billy Kimber was a former Peaky Blinder.

=== Weapons and fashion ===
In addition to guns, the Peaky Blinders used an assortment of other weapons, such as belt buckles, metal-tipped boots, fire irons, canes, and knives. In the case of George Eastwood, he was beaten by belt buckles. Percy Langridge used a knife to stab Police Constable Barker in June 1900. Firearms such as Webley revolvers were used, such as in the shooting and killing of a Summer Hill gang member by Peaky Blinder William Lacey in September 1905.

Gang members frequently wore tailored clothing, which was uncommon for gangs of the time. All members wore a flat cap and an overcoat. The Peaky Blinders wore tailored suits usually with bell-bottom trousers and button jackets. Wealthier members wore silk scarves and starched collars with metal tie buttons. Their distinctive dress was easily recognisable by city inhabitants, police, and rival gang members. The wives, girlfriends, and mistresses of the gang members were known for wearing lavish clothing. Pearls, silks, and colourful scarves were commonplace.

== Decline ==
After a decade of political control, their growing influence brought on the attention of a larger gang, the Birmingham Boys. The Peaky Blinders' expansion into racecourses led to violent backlash from the Birmingham Boys gang. Peaky Blinder families physically distanced themselves from Birmingham's centre into the countryside. With the Blinders' withdrawal from the criminal underworld, the Sabini gang moved in on the Birmingham Boys gang and solidified political control over Central England in the 1930s.

Other elements such as education, discipline, and harsher policing and sentencing contributed to the decrease of the Blinders' influence and, by the 1920s, they had disappeared. As the specific gang known as the Peaky Blinders diminished, their name came to be used as generic term to describe violent street youth. The gang's activities lasted from the 1880s until the 1920s.

== In popular culture ==
The BBC television drama series Peaky Blinders, starring Cillian Murphy, Paul Anderson, Sam Neill and Helen McCrory, premiered in September 2013. It presents a fictional story in which the Peaky Blinders contend in the underworld with the Birmingham Boys and the Sabini gang, and it follows the gang based in post-World War I Birmingham's Small Heath area. The gang had houses located in and around Birmingham, ranging from Longbridge to Sutton Coldfield. Many of the show's exteriors have been filmed on location at the Black Country Living Museum.

The series developed into a movie: Peaky Blinders: The Immortal Man, directed by Tom Harper and written by Steven Knight. The film premiered on 2 March 2026 and aired on Netflix on 20 March 2026.
