= List of Peaky Blinders characters =

List of Characters

Peaky Blinders is a British period crime drama television series created by Steven Knight. Set in Birmingham, it follows the exploits of the Peaky Blinders crime gang in the direct aftermath of the First World War. The fictional gang is loosely based on a real urban youth gang by the same name, who were active in the city between the 1880s and the 1910s.

The programme premiered on 12 September 2013. It was broadcast on BBC Two, with repeats on BBC Four, until the fourth series. It then moved to BBC One for the fifth and sixth series.

== Cast table ==
Character	Portrayed by	Series						The Immortal Man
Character	Portrayed by	1	2	3	4	5	6	The Immortal Man
Thomas "Tommy" Shelby	Cillian Murphy	Main	Main	Main	Main	Main	Main	Starring
Chief Inspector/Major Chester Campbell	Sam Neill	Main (Note: Neill is credited as a guest star in Episode #2.1, and returns to the main cast in Episode #2.2 onwards.)	Main					
Elizabeth Pollyanna "Polly" Gray, née Shelby	Helen McCrory	Main	Main	Main	Main	Main		
Arthur Shelby Jr.	Paul Anderson	Main	Main	Main	Main	Main	Main	Body double
Grace Shelby, née Burgess	Annabelle Wallis	Main (Note: Wallis is credited as a guest star from Episode #2.1 to #2.4, and returns to the main cast from Episode #2.5 onwards.) (Note: Wallis is credited as a guest star in Episode #3.1, returns to the main cast for Episode #3.2, and is credited as a guest star in Episode #3.5.)	Main	Main		Main		
Freddie Thorne	Iddo Goldberg	Main						
Ada Thorne, née Shelby	Sophie Rundle	Main	Main	Main	Main	Main	Main	Starring
John "Johnny" Shelby	Joe Cole	Main	Main	Main	Main			
Charlie Strong	Ned Dennehy	Main	Main	Main	Main	Main	Main	Supporting
Jeremiah "Jimmy" Jesus	Benjamin Zephaniah	Main (Note: Zephaniah is credited as a guest star from Episode #2.2 to #2.4, and returns to the main cast in Episode #2.6.) (Note: Zephaniah appears in only one episode of series 3, although credited with the main cast.) (Note: Zephaniah is credited with the main cast in Episode #6.1, as a guest star in Episode #6.4, and returns to the main cast in Episode #6.6.)	Main	Main	Main	Main	Main	
Roberts	David Dawson	Main						
Winston Churchill	Andy Nyman	Main (Note: Nyman is credited as a guest star in Episode #1.1, and is credited with the main cast from Episode #1.2 onwards.)						
Winston Churchill	Richard McCabe		Recurring					
Winston Churchill	Neil Maskell					Main (Note: Maskell appears in only one episode of series 6, although credited with the main cast.)	Main	
Billy Kimber	Charlie Creed-Miles	Main						
Arthur Shelby Sr.	Tommy Flanagan	Main (Note: Flanagan appears in only one episode, although credited with the main cast.)						
Darby Sabini	Noah Taylor		Main					
Alfred "Alfie" Solomons	Tom Hardy		Main (Note: Hardy appears in only one episode of series 5, although credited with the main cast.)	Main	Main	Main	Main	
May Fitz Carleton	Charlotte Riley		Main		Main			
Michael Gray	Finn Cole		Main (Note: Cole is credited as a guest star in Episode #2.2, and is credited with the main cast from Episode #2.3 onwards.)	Main	Main	Main	Main	
Lizzie Shelby, née Stark	Natasha O'Keeffe	Guest	Main (Note: O'Keeffe is credited as a guest star in Episodes #2.1 to #2.5, and is credited with the main cast from Episode #2.6 onwards.)	Main	Main	Main	Main	
Esme Shelby-Lee	Aimee-Ffion Edwards	Recurring	Recurring	Main	Main		Main	
Grand Duchess Tatiana Petrovna	Gaite Jansen			Main				
Ruben Oliver	Alexander Siddig			Main				
Johnny Dogs	Packy Lee	Recurring	Recurring	Main	Main	Main	Main	Supporting
Arch Duke Leon Romanov	Jan Bijvoet			Main				
Grand Duchess Izabella Petrovna	Dina Korzun			Main				
Father John Hughes	Paddy Considine			Main				
Linda Shelby	Kate Phillips			Recurring	Main	Main	Main	
Jessie Eden	Charlie Murphy				Main	Main		
Luca Changretta	Adrien Brody				Main			
Curly	Ian Peck	Recurring	Recurring	Recurring	Main	Main	Main	Supporting
Bonnie Gold	Jack Rowan				Main (Note: Rowan appears in only one episode of series 5, although credited with the main cast.)	Main		
Aberama Gold	Aidan Gillen				Main	Main		
Gina Gray	Anya Taylor-Joy					Main	Main	
Colonel Ben Younger	Kingsley Ben-Adir				Guest	Main		
Sir Oswald Mosley	Sam Claflin					Main	Main	
Jimmy McCavern	Brian Gleeson					Main		
Mother Superior	Kate Dickie					Main (Note: Dickie appears in only one episode, although credited with the main cast.)		
Brilliant Chang	Andrew Koji					Main		
Barney Thomason	Cosmo Jarvis					Main		
Finn Shelby	Alfie Evans-Meese	Recurring						
Finn Shelby	Harry Kirton		Recurring	Recurring	Recurring	Recurring	Main	
Laura McKee/Captain Swing	Charlene McKenna					Guest	Main (Note: McKenna is credited with the main cast in Episode #6.1, as a guest star from Episode #6.2 to #6.4, and returns to the main cast in Episode #6.6.)	
Frances	Pauline Turner				Recurring	Recurring	Main (Note: Turner is credited with the main cast in only one episode, Episode #6.1, and is credited as a guest star from Episode #6.4 to #6.6.)	
Lady Diana Mitford (Note: A fictive version of Diana Mitford, who was never called "Lady Diana Mitford".)	Amber Anderson						Main	
Jack Nelson	James Frecheville						Main	
Hayden Stagg	Stephen Graham						Main	Starring
Erasmus "Duke" Shelby	Conrad Khan						Main	
Erasmus "Duke" Shelby	Barry Keoghan							Starring
Isiah Jesus	Jordan Bolger		Recurring	Recurring	Recurring			
Isiah Jesus	Daryl McCormack					Recurring	Main (Note: McCormack is credited as a guest star from Episode #6.2 to #6.5 and is credited with the main cast in only one episode, Episode #6.6.)	
Billy Grade	Emmett J. Scanlan					Recurring	Main (Note: Scanlan is credited as a guest star in Episode #6.5 and is credited with the main cast in only one episode, Episode #6.6.)	
Kaulo Chiriklo	Rebecca Ferguson							Starring
Zelda Chiriklo	Rebecca Ferguson							Starring
John Beckett	Tim Roth							Starring

== Main characters ==
=== Tommy Shelby ===
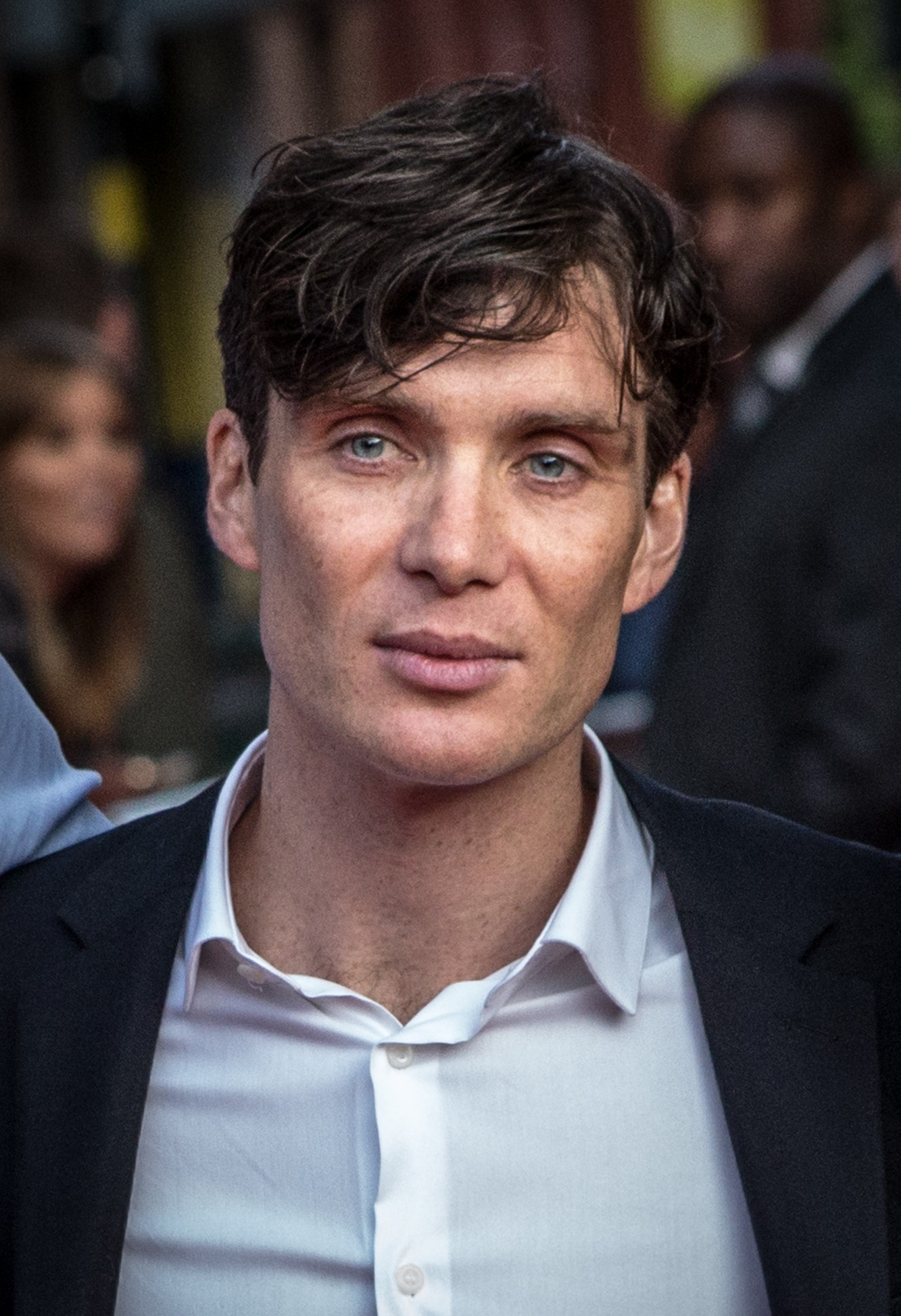
Cillian Murphy

Thomas Michael "Tommy" Shelby (portrayed by Cillian Murphy) is the main protagonist of Peaky Blinders. He is the son of Arthur and Mrs Shelby, and the brother of Arthur, John, Ada, and Finn Shelby. As patriarch of the Shelby family, he leads the Peaky Blinders, a notorious criminal gang based in Birmingham.

During World War I, Tommy serves as a Sergeant Major and is decorated with medals for gallantry, which he discards into a canal upon returning home. The horrors of the war leave him deeply disillusioned and plagued by recurring nightmares. These experiences fuel his determination to improve his family's social standing and protect them from being mistreated.

After a bitter rivalry with the New York Mafia and amid the chaos of the Wall Street Crash, Tommy becomes a Member of Parliament for the Labour Party, entrusting the management of the family's legal business to his older brother, Arthur Shelby.

Tommy is respected in his community and regarded as dangerous by his enemies. Under his leadership, the Peaky Blinders transforms from a local street gang into a national organisation, clashing with major entities, such as the New York Mafia. His wartime experiences make him fearless and nearly impossible to intimidate. Despite his violent ways, Tommy shows moments of remorse, reflecting on his actions throughout the series.

By the fifth series, Tommy is deeply depressed and struggles with suicidal thoughts, attempting to take his own life multiple times. After the death of Polly Gray, he becomes sober and gives up drinking. Later, he is falsely diagnosed with an inoperable tuberculoma, leading him to demolish his home, say farewell to his family, and retreat into the wild to live alone. Upon his return, he watches as his wagon and remaining possessions burn before riding away into the unknown.

=== Arthur Shelby Jr. ===
Arthur Shelby Jr. (portrayed by Paul Anderson) is one of the central protagonists of Peaky Blinders. He is the eldest son of Arthur and Mrs. Shelby and the older brother of Tommy, John, Ada, and Finn. Arthur is married to Linda Shelby, and together they have a son, Billy Shelby. A key member of the Peaky Blinders, he serves as the Deputy Vice-President of Shelby Company Limited and plays a pivotal role in the Industrial Cleaners Association (ICA), working as his brother Tommy's assistant.

Throughout the series, Arthur grapples with a crippling drug addiction, which steadily erodes his life. He remains fiercely loyal to his family, but his deep remorse for his past actions haunts him. Though he desperately wants to do right by those he loves, Arthur struggles to keep his impulses in check. His temper flares easily, especially when he feels his or his family's pride is threatened.

In the second series, Arthur’s PTSD from his time in World War I comes to light. To cope, he turns to cocaine, hoping it will dull the pain, but it only deepens his emotional and mental turmoil.

=== Ada Thorne ===
Ada Thorne (née Shelby) (portrayed by Sophie Rundle) is the fourth and only female sibling in the Shelby family. At first, she is the only one of her brothers not involved with the Peaky Blinders. However, by the end of third series, Ada takes on a leading role in the US branch of Shelby Company Limited, where she focuses exclusively on legal acquisitions, a contrast to her brothers' more hands-on involvement in Birmingham.

Ada is the widow of the known communist, Freddie Thorne, with whom she has a son, Karl Thorne, named after Karl Marx. Ada Thorne has a brief, secret relationship with Colonel Ben Younger, an intelligence officer, following the death of her husband, Freddie Thorne. Ada gives birth to a daughter named Elizabeth "Betty" Younger following Ben's death.

=== Polly Gray ===
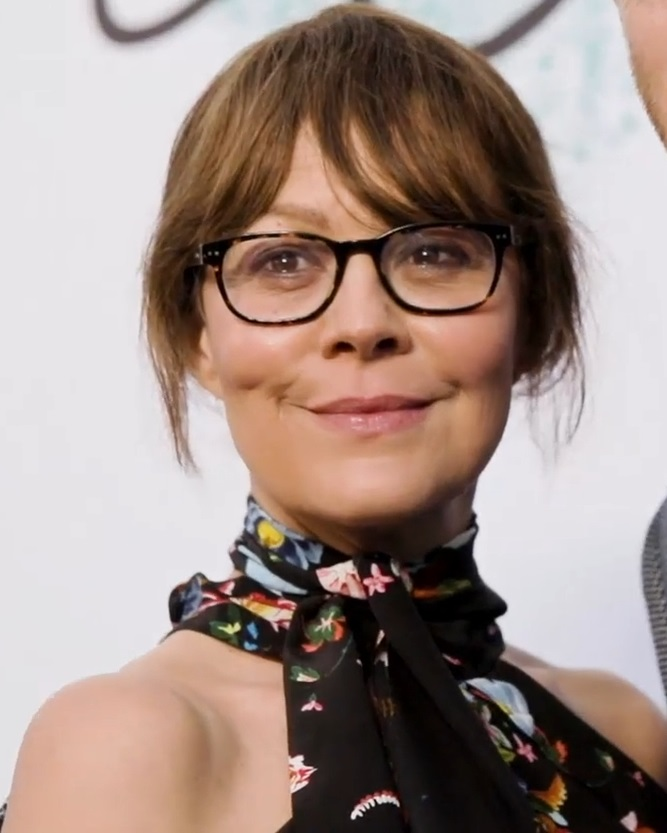
Helen McCrory

Elizabeth Pollyanna "Polly" Gray (née Shelby) (portrayed by Helen McCrory) is the mother of Michael and Anna Gray, and the aunt of Arthur, Tommy, John, Ada, and Finn Shelby. She serves as the matriarch of the Shelby family. A key member of the Peaky Blinders, Polly is a certified accountant and the company treasurer for Shelby Company Limited.

While the Shelby brothers are away during World War I, Polly takes charge of managing the Peaky Blinders' operations. Upon their return, she continues to play a central role in supporting the family, helping to resolve feuds and offering guidance on key decisions and company policies.

Polly is killed by the IRA, a direct consequence of her nephews' actions after their failed attempt to assassinate Oswald Mosley. Her body is delivered to Tommy’s home, Arrow House, where he is consumed with grief and guilt over her death.

=== John Shelby ===
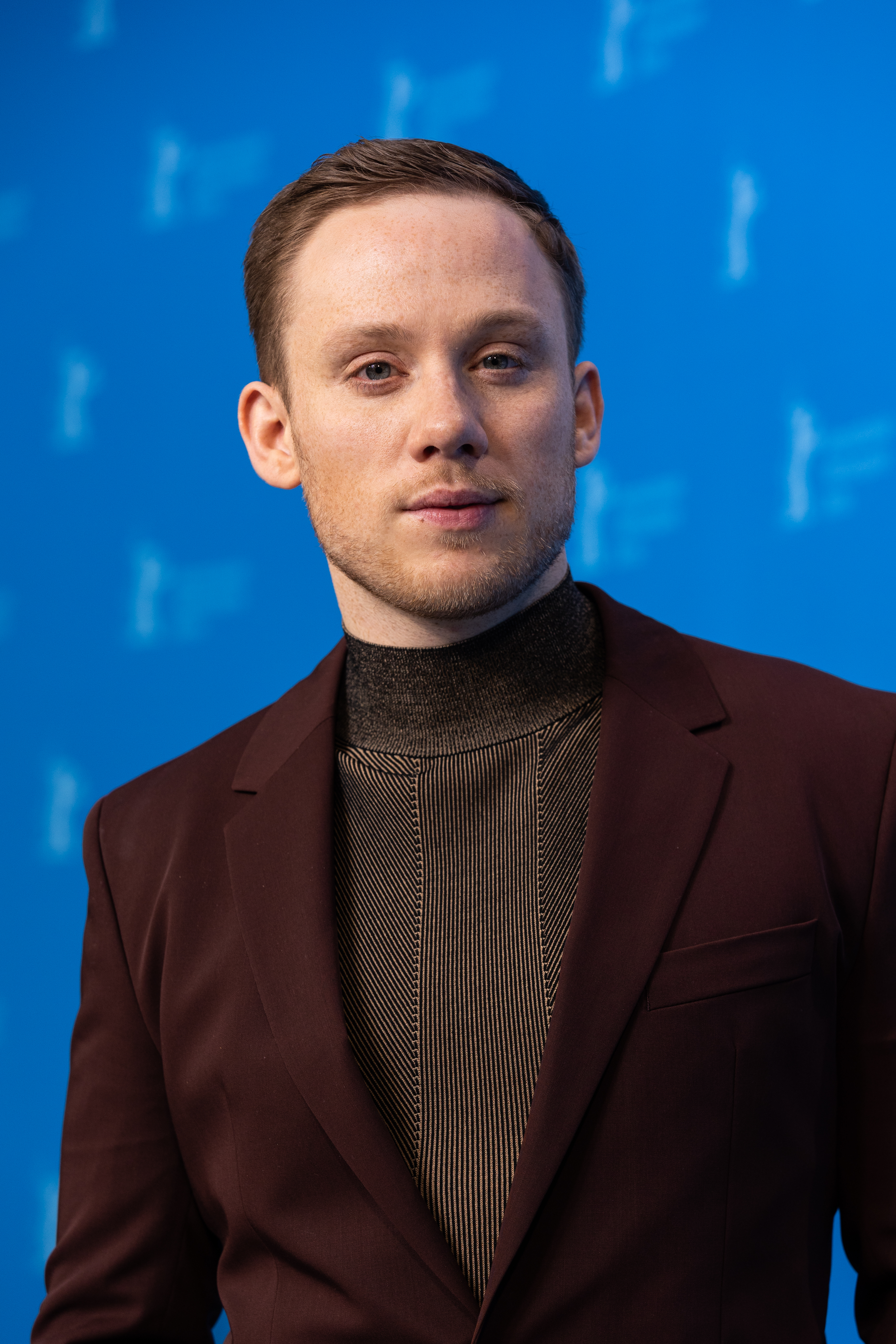
Joe Cole

John Michael "Johnny" Shelby, also known as John Boy (portrayed by Joe Cole), is the third son of Arthur Shelby Sr. and the brother of Arthur, Tommy, Ada, and Finn Shelby. He had seven children: two sons and two daughters with his late first wife, Martha Shelby, and three children with his second wife, Esme. One of his daughters is named Katie Shelby.

John served as a soldier during World War I. Upon returning to Birmingham, he becomes a high-ranking member of the Peaky Blinders and holds a one-third share in the Shelby family business, Shelby Company Limited. He is shot and killed by Changretta's men in the fourth series.

=== Grace Shelby ===
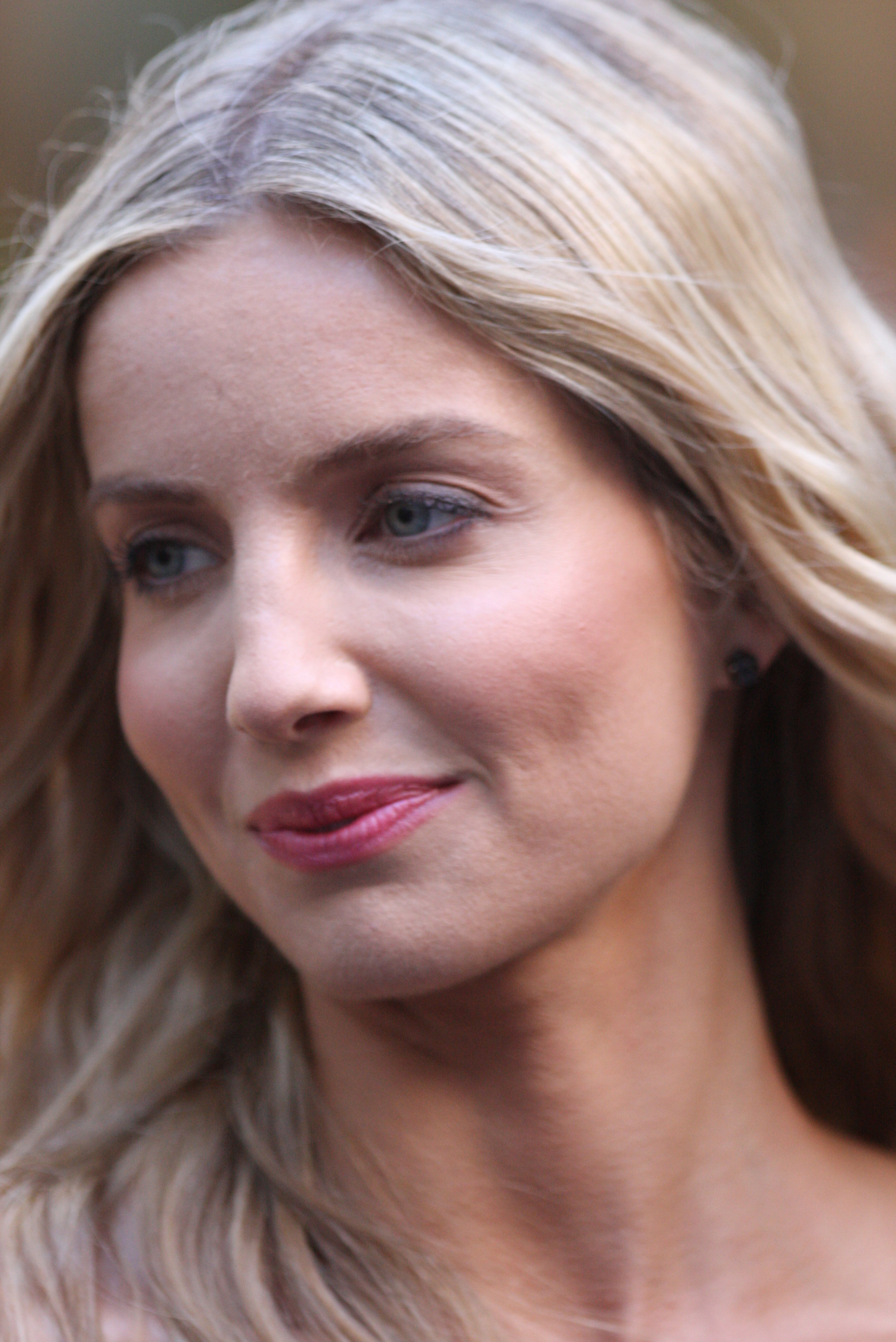
Annabelle Wallis

Grace Helen Shelby (née Burgess) (portrayed by Annabelle Wallis) is an Irish woman who works as a barmaid at The Garrison pub while secretly serving as an undercover agent for the Birmingham Police. Her mission is to get close to Tommy Shelby in order to recover stolen weapons. She operates under Inspector Campbell, who knew her late father, and claims to have been trained as a secret operative. By the end of the first series, she and Tommy become lovers. Their relationship is brief, as she soon leaves for America. Despite urging him to join her, Tommy rejects her offer.

Two years later, Grace marries Clive Macmillan, a wealthy banker, and settles in Poughkeepsie, New York. Despite her new life, her feelings for Tommy remain. When she returns to London, she reunites with him and confesses that she is still in love with him and is carrying his child.

In the third series, Grace and Tommy marry and move to a country estate with their young son, Charles. Soon after, Grace is shot and killed by an Italian assassin during an evening party, on the orders of Vicente Changretta.

=== Chester Campbell ===
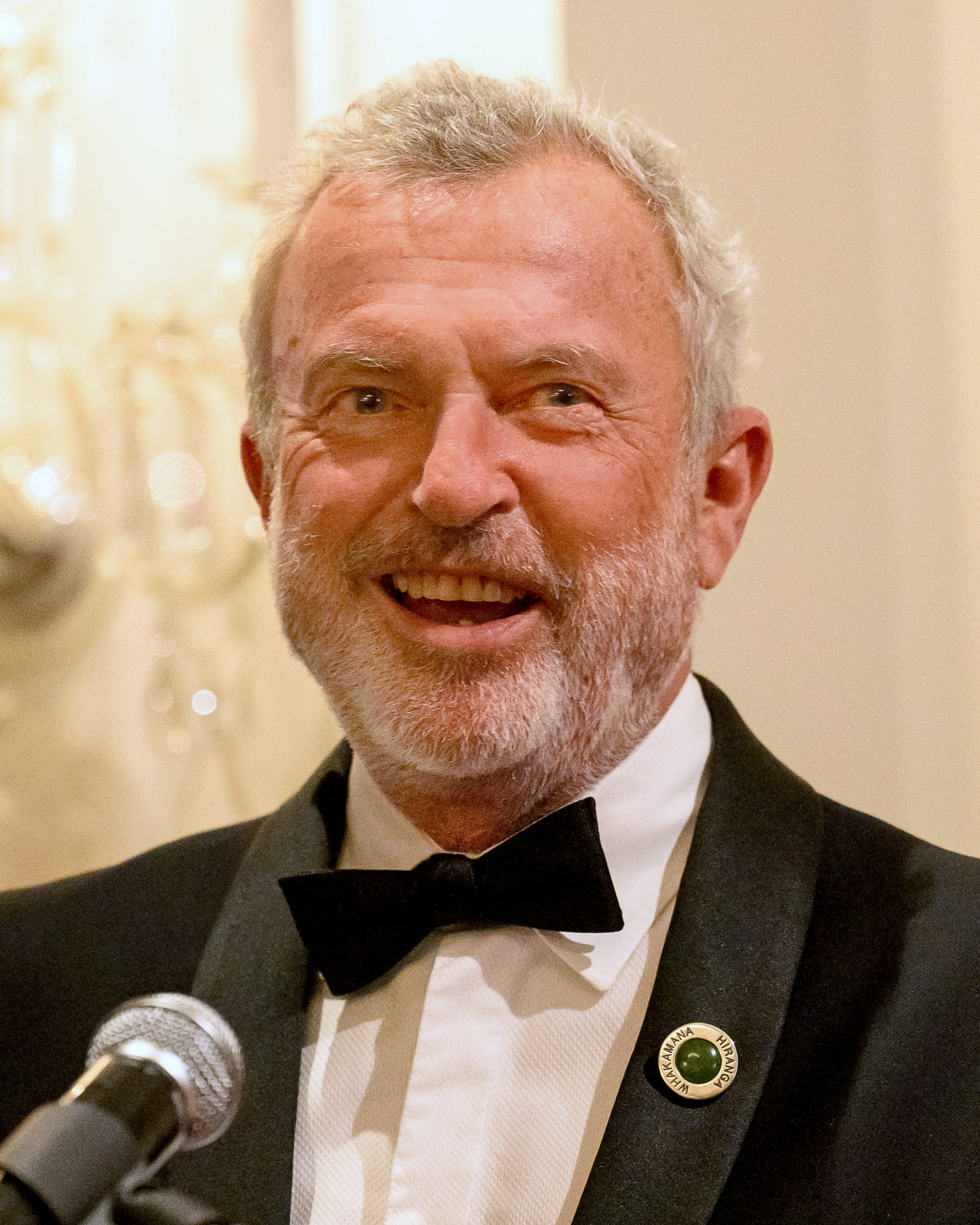
Sam Neill

Chester Campbell (portrayed by Sam Neill) is an inspector in the Royal Irish Constabulary, hired by Winston Churchill to track down and recover a missing consignment of guns from the Birmingham Small Arms factory. Although he is clearly dedicated to upholding the law, he readily resorts to brutal and underhanded tactics, like ordering his henchmen to commit criminal acts.

In the second series, Polly Gray corners Major Campbell in a phone booth while he is talking to Winston Churchill. Despite his desperate pleas, she shoots him.

=== Winston Churchill ===
Winston Churchill (portrayed by Andy Nyman in series 1, Richard McCabe in series 2, and Neil Maskell in series 5–6) serves as the Secretary of State for the Colonies during the second series. He hires Inspector Campbell, a man he finds amusing but also a strong candidate for the job, to retrieve his stolen machine guns. Two years after Campbell's death, it is revealed that Churchill continues to strike deals with Tommy Shelby, a partnership that remains mutually beneficial. His character is based on the historical figure by the same name.

=== Michael Gray ===
Michael Gray (portrayed by Finn Cole) is the son of Polly Gray and the cousin of the Shelby siblings. He was taken from Polly at a young age and raised by his adoptive mother. When Polly expresses her wish to reunite with her children, Tommy visits Michael’s foster family and invites him to meet his biological mother. Michael reunites with Polly and becomes part of the Shelby family and the Peaky Blinders at the age of 17. He begins his journey on the respectable, legal side of the family business, Shelby Company Limited.

After Polly is murdered by the IRA, Michael is devastated and believes that Tommy’s ambition and schemes led to her death. He swears revenge on Tommy at any cost. By the sixth series, Michael is completely estranged from the Shelby family and has moved to the US, where he lives with his son, Laurence, and his wife, Gina.

During the series finale, Michael attempts to kill Tommy using a car bomb. Tommy, who anticipates the attempt, has Johnny Dogs switch the device, and the resulting explosion kills Michael's associates instead. In the aftermath, Tommy shoots Michael in the head, murdering him.

=== Freddie Thorne ===
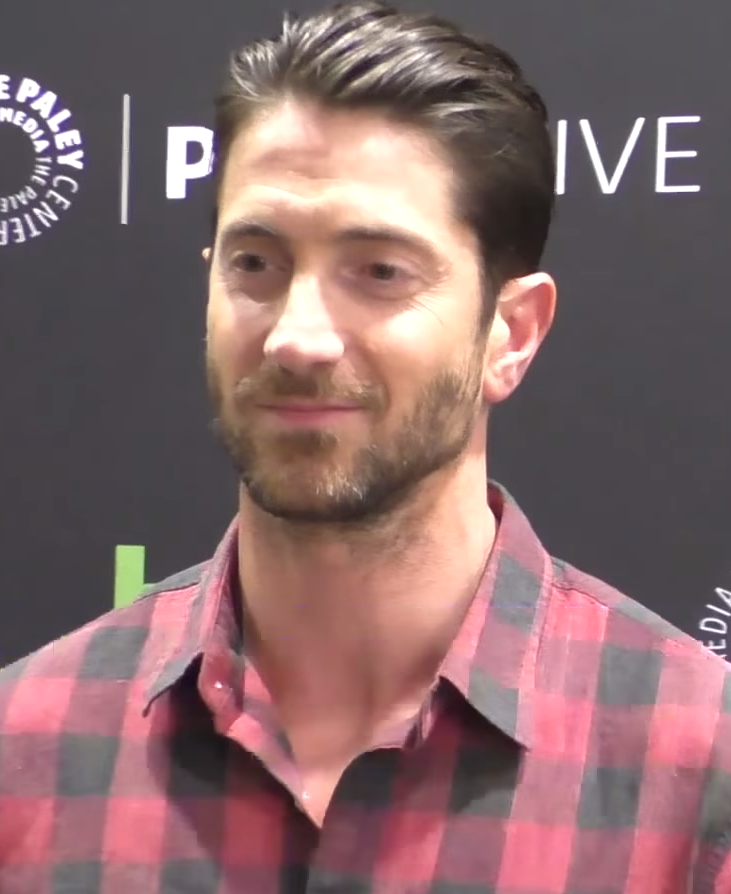
Iddo Goldberg

Freddie Thorne (portrayed by Iddo Goldberg) is a known communist living in Birmingham who was once a close friend of Tommy Shelby. He is briefly married to Ada Thorne, with whom he has a son, Karl Thorne, named after Karl Marx. In the second series, it is revealed that he died of "pestilence", presumably the Spanish flu, between the first and second series.

=== Finn Shelby ===
Finn Shelby (portrayed by Alfie Evans-Meese in series 1 and Harry Kirton in series 2–6) is the youngest member of the Peaky Blinders. He is the son of Arthur Shelby Sr. and Mrs. Shelby and the brother of Arthur, Tommy, John, and Ada. He eventually marries Mary Shelby.

From the outset, Finn has always been the outsider among his siblings. He is significantly younger than the others, which means he missed out on the brutal experiences they endured, like serving in World War I. As a result, his brothers often perceive him as weak, immature, and lacking experience. They believe he does not possess the ruthless nature of a "true" Shelby. As Finn matures, his interests shift toward leisure and partying, which further alienates him from his family. His lack of focus and discipline proves to be a liability.

In the series finale, while beating Billy Grade for informing the IRA about the failed assassination attempt on Oswald Mosley, Isiah and Duke reveal that Tommy has informed them that Finn must shoot Billy to prove his loyalty. They make it clear that if he refuses, he will be cast out of the family for good. A shaken Finny lashes out in response. He hurls insults at Duke’s mother and attempts to shoot Isiah. When he pulls the trigger, however, the gun merely clicks as Duke had already emptied the same, ensuring that Finn’s betrayal would be exposed without anyone being harmed. Left with no other option, he formally expels Finn from the family, severing his ties with the Peaky Blinders permanently.

=== Alfie Solomons ===
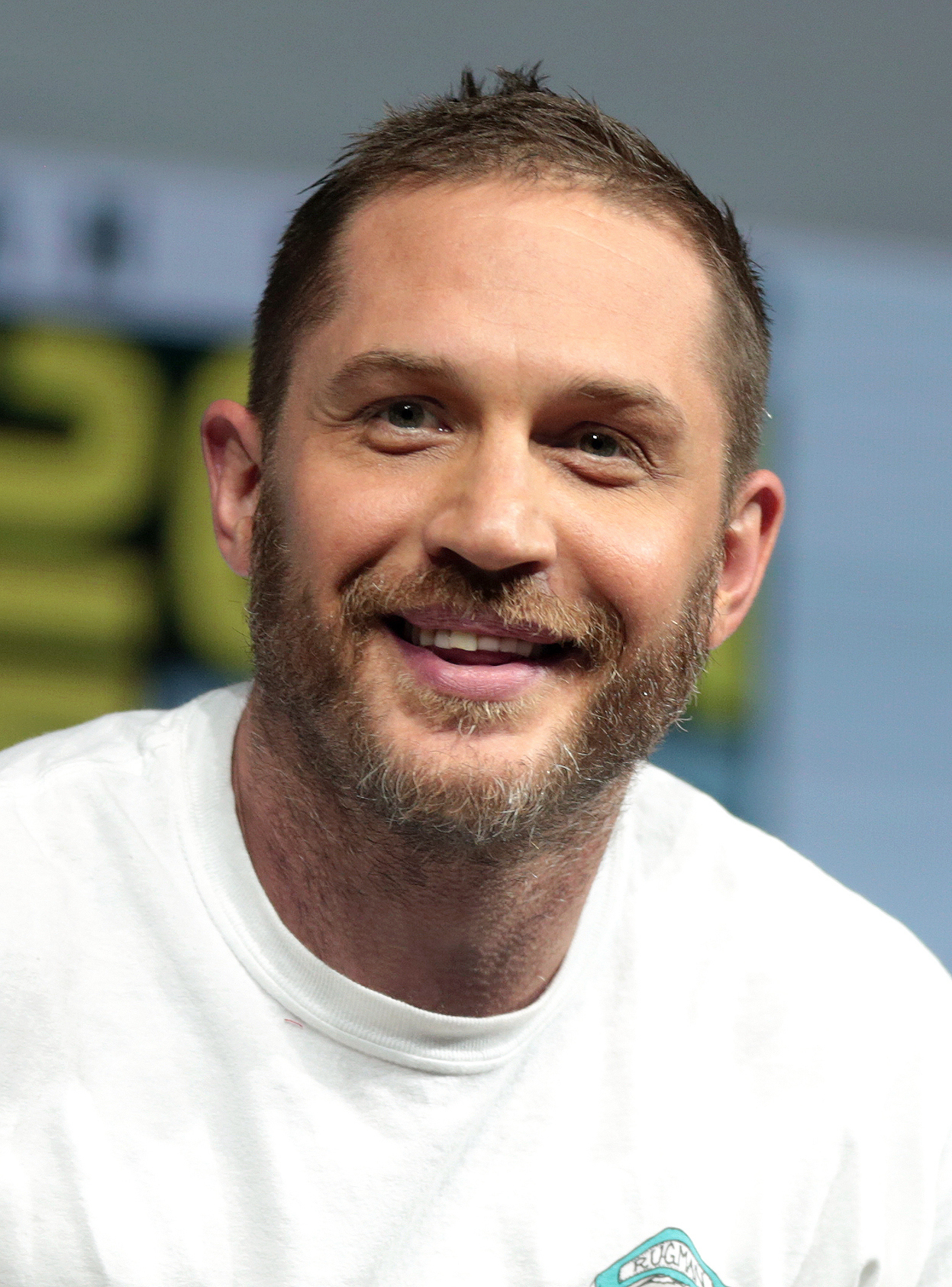
Tom Hardy

Alfred "Alfie" Solomons Jr. (portrayed by Tom Hardy) is a Jewish gang leader who lives in Camden Town, London. His character is based on the Jewish gangster by the same name. Although a significant portion of Alfie's wealth comes from racetrack rackets, his business empire also includes a rum distillery, a jewellery business, and protection rackets throughout the borough.

=== Billy Kimber ===
William "Billy" Kimber (portrayed by Charlie Creed-Miles) is an English gangster and the head of the Birmingham Boys, the primary enemy of Tommy Shelby and the Peaky Blinders. He controls most of the legal racing venues outside London, creating tension between himself and the Peaky Blinders, who aim to expand into inner-city London.

Due to his wealth and influence, Kimber has police officers on his payroll and an assistant named Roberts.

=== Darby Sabini ===
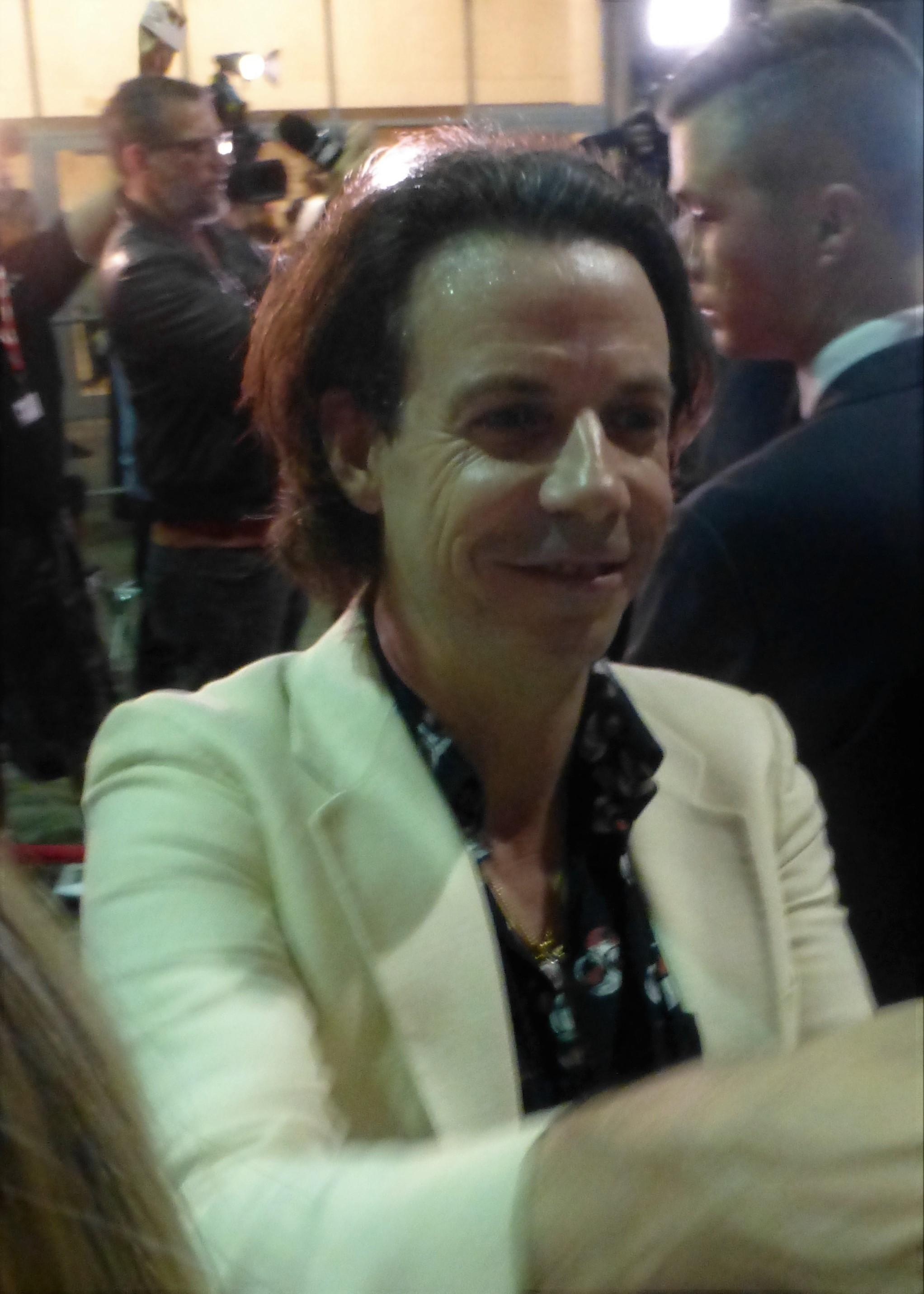
Noah Taylor

Charles "Darby" Sabini (portrayed by Noah Taylor) is a British Italian gang leader from London. He is at war with Alfie Solomons and Tommy Shelby in the second series.

As leader of the Sabinis and "king of the racecourse gangs", he dominates the London underworld and the racecourses across southern England. Although his Clerkenwell-based organisation earns most of its income from racecourse protection rackets targeting bookmakers, it is also involved in various criminal activities, including extortion, theft, and the operation of several nightclubs. His group has an estimated 300 members, some of whom are Sicilian gunmen, and they are notorious for razor attacks. His network also has extensive connections with judges, politicians, and police officials.

Conflicts with rival gangs such as the Birmingham Boys, the Elephant and Castle Mob, the Cortesi brothers, and the Yiddishers are frequent throughout the show. During the second series, Sabini faces off in a gunfight with the Cortesi brothers.

=== Lizzie Shelby ===
Elizabeth "Lizzie" Shelby (née Stark) (portrayed by Natasha O'Keeffe), previously a sex worker in Small Heath, Birmingham, is the second wife of Tommy Shelby, the mother of Ruby Shelby, and stepmother to his eldest son, Charles Shelby. Despite remaining loyal to the Shelby family, she is treated cruelly by them. Tommy makes her his secretary, but he expects her to comply with his every need, including playing the role of a "whore" when necessary. The family also dictates who she can see or spend time with.

After learning of Tommy's affair with Diana Mitford in the final series, Lizzie decides to leave him. When Charles expresses a desire to come with her, she warns him that his father will not allow it. To her surprise, he does the opposite.

=== Linda Shelby ===
Linda Shelby (portrayed by Kate Phillips) is the ex-wife of Arthur Shelby Jr. and was once a close ally of the Peaky Blinders. When Arthur begins struggling with his mental health, Linda grows distant and ultimately attempts to divorce him before eventually helping him with his sobriety. As his condition worsens, however, she turns against him and plots his death. She is addicted to cocaine and was once a Quaker.

=== Esme Shelby ===
Esme Martha Shelby (née Lee) (portrayed by Aimee-Ffion Edwards) is a member of the Lee Family and, by her arranged marriage to John Shelby, a part of the Shelby family. Her involvement with the Peaky Blinders is minimal. Instead, her role is to care for John’s four children.

After John's death, Esme moves to the mountains with her children in search of a quiet life. Tommy seeks her out years later to help him find a cure for his daughter, Ruby’s, curse. Esme is also the one to inform Tommy about his lost son, Duke Shelby.

=== Isiah Jesus ===
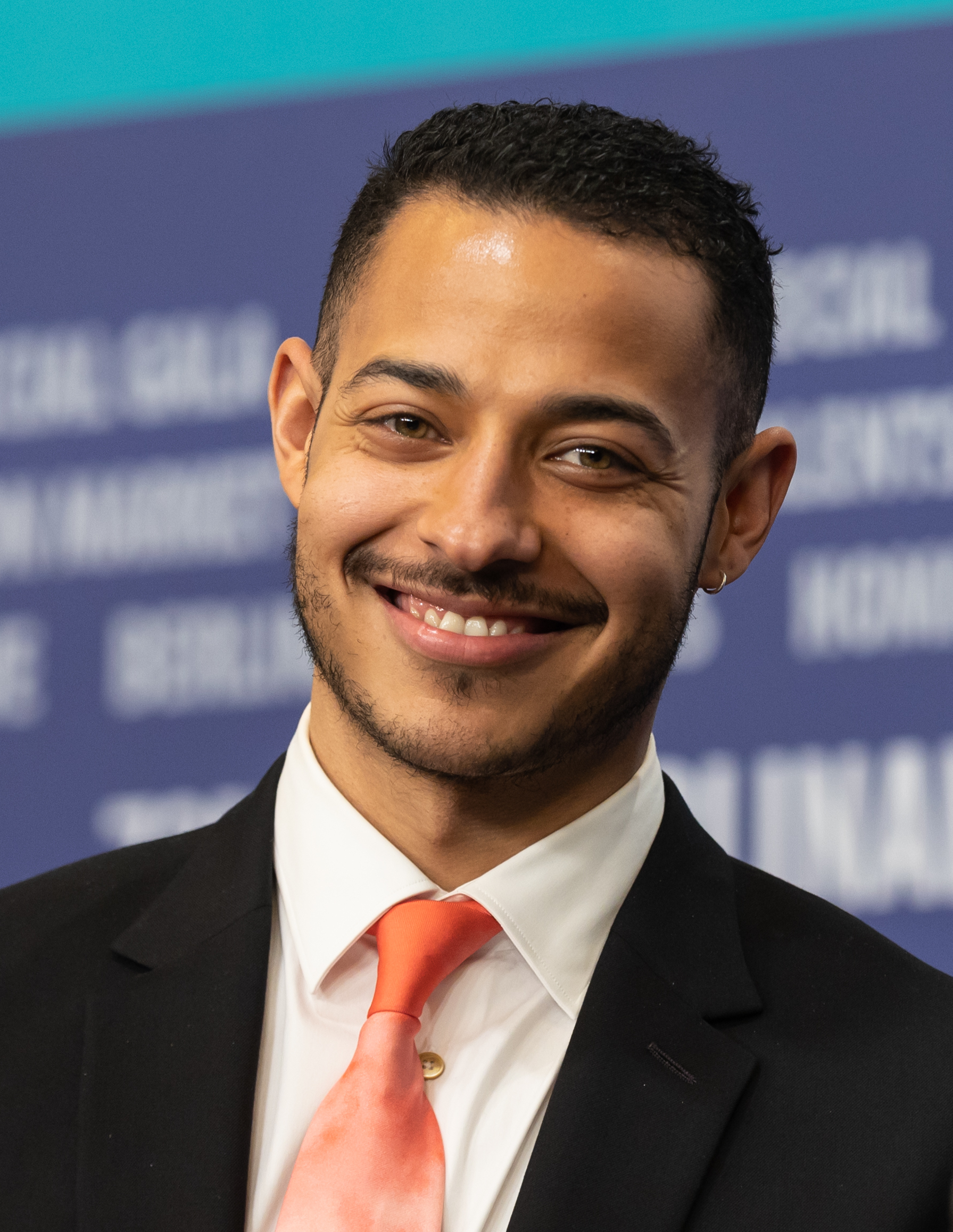
Daryl McCormack

Isiah Jesus (portrayed by Jordan Bolger in series 1–4 and Daryl McCormack in series 5–6) is the son of Jeremiah Jesus and a member of the Peaky Blinders. He is a close friend of Finn Shelby. During the sixth series, Tommy promotes Isiah to Arthur's lieutenant during the Hayden Stagg mission. Later, when Billy Grade is revealed to be an informant, Finn attempts to shoot Isiah, but Duke Shelby, having already emptied the first two chambers of the gun, saves Isiah's life.

=== Tatiana Petrovna ===
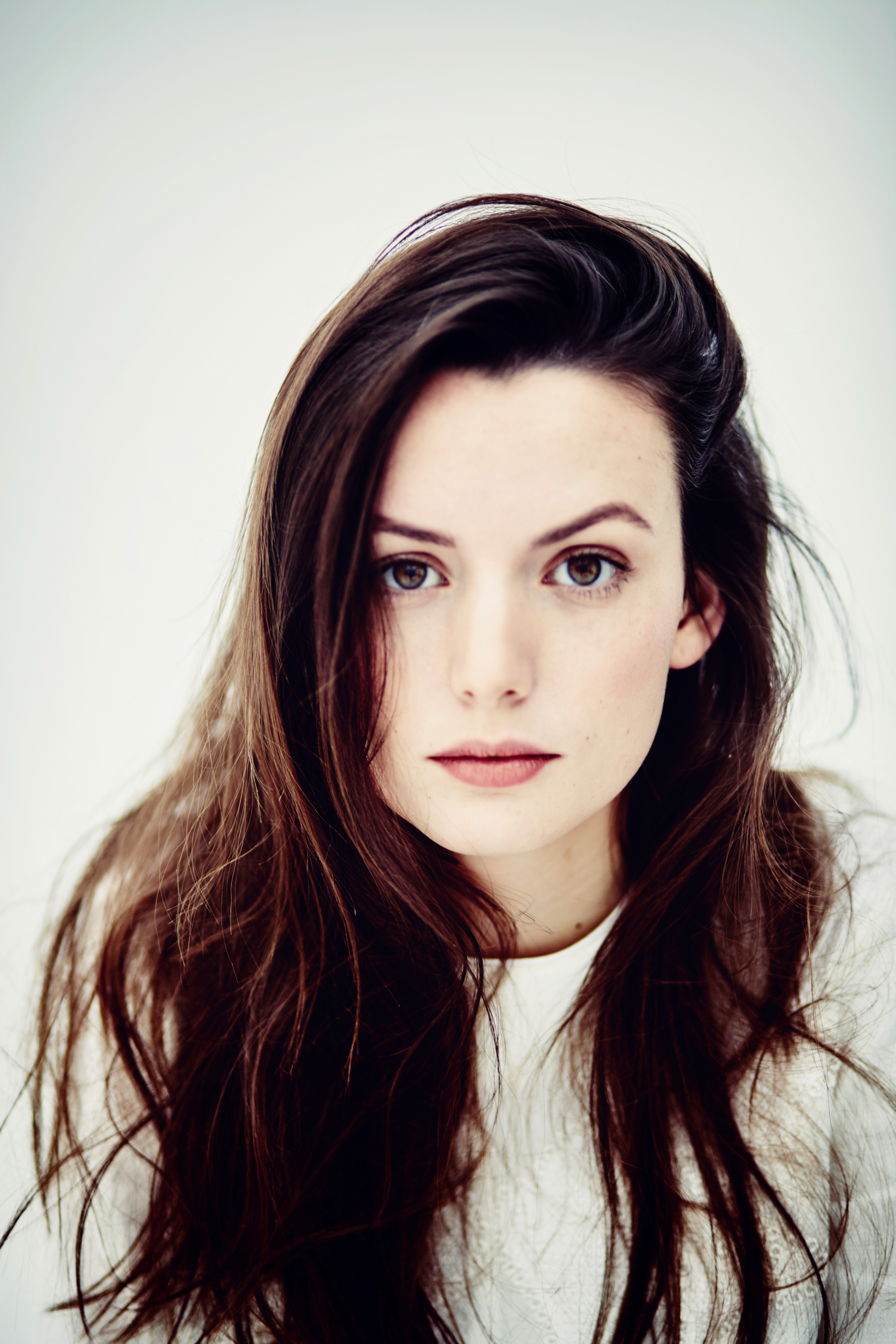
Gaite Jansen

Tatiana Petrovna (portrayed by Gaite Jansen) is a Russian grand duchess who fled her homeland after the Russian Revolution. She is brought to Tommy Shelby from London by Sergeant Moss of the Birmingham City Police. There, she strikes a deal with him to steal her family's jewels so that she can escape to another country to join her lover.

=== Father Hughes ===
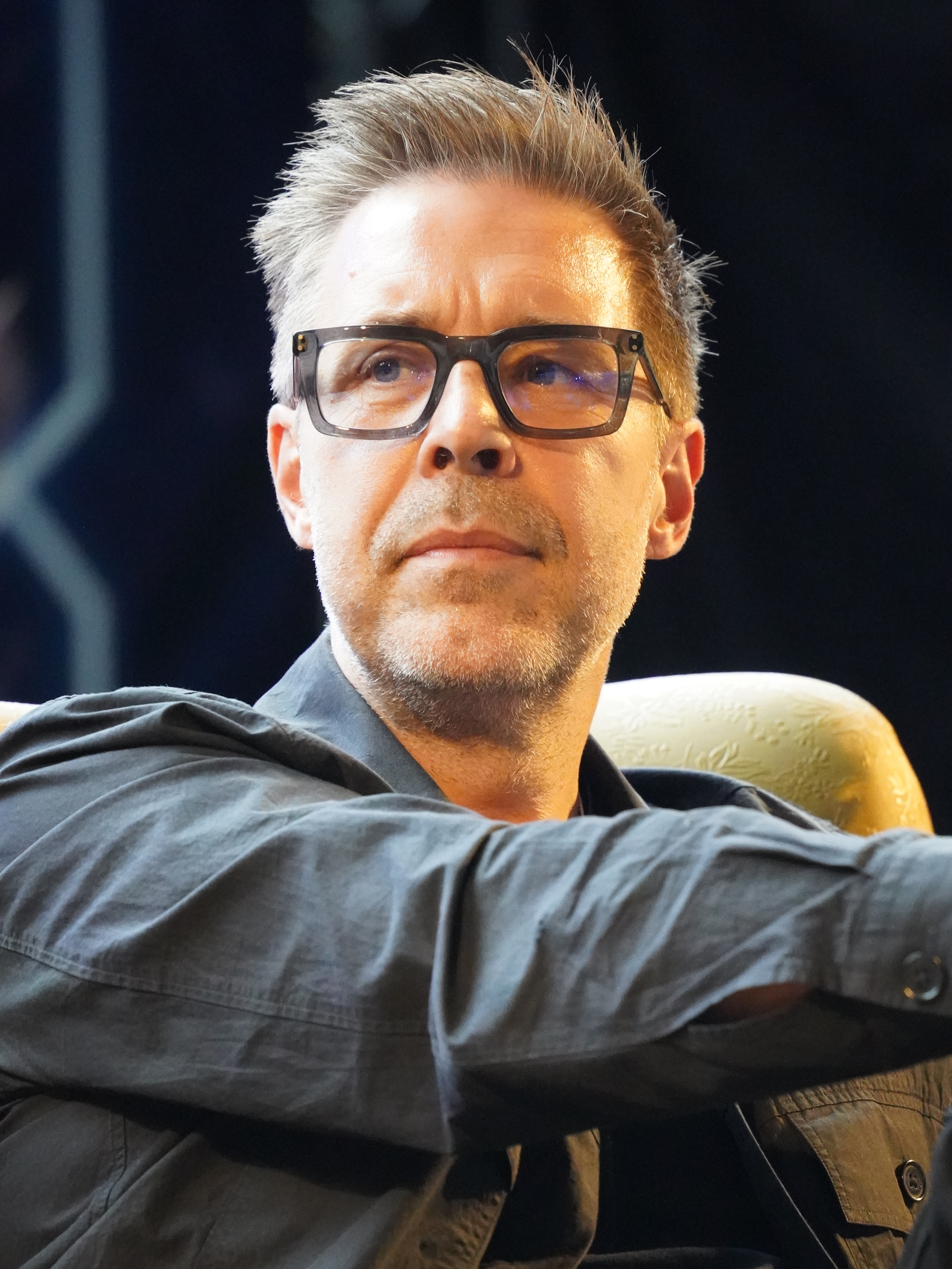
Paddy Considine

Father John Hughes (portrayed by Paddy Considine) is an agent of The Economic League. He oversees the scheme to incite diplomatic conflict between Great Britain and the Soviet Union. In the third series, it is revealed that he molested Michael Gray when he was placed under his care at the age of six. This revelation leads Michael to stab him to death.

=== Aberama Gold ===
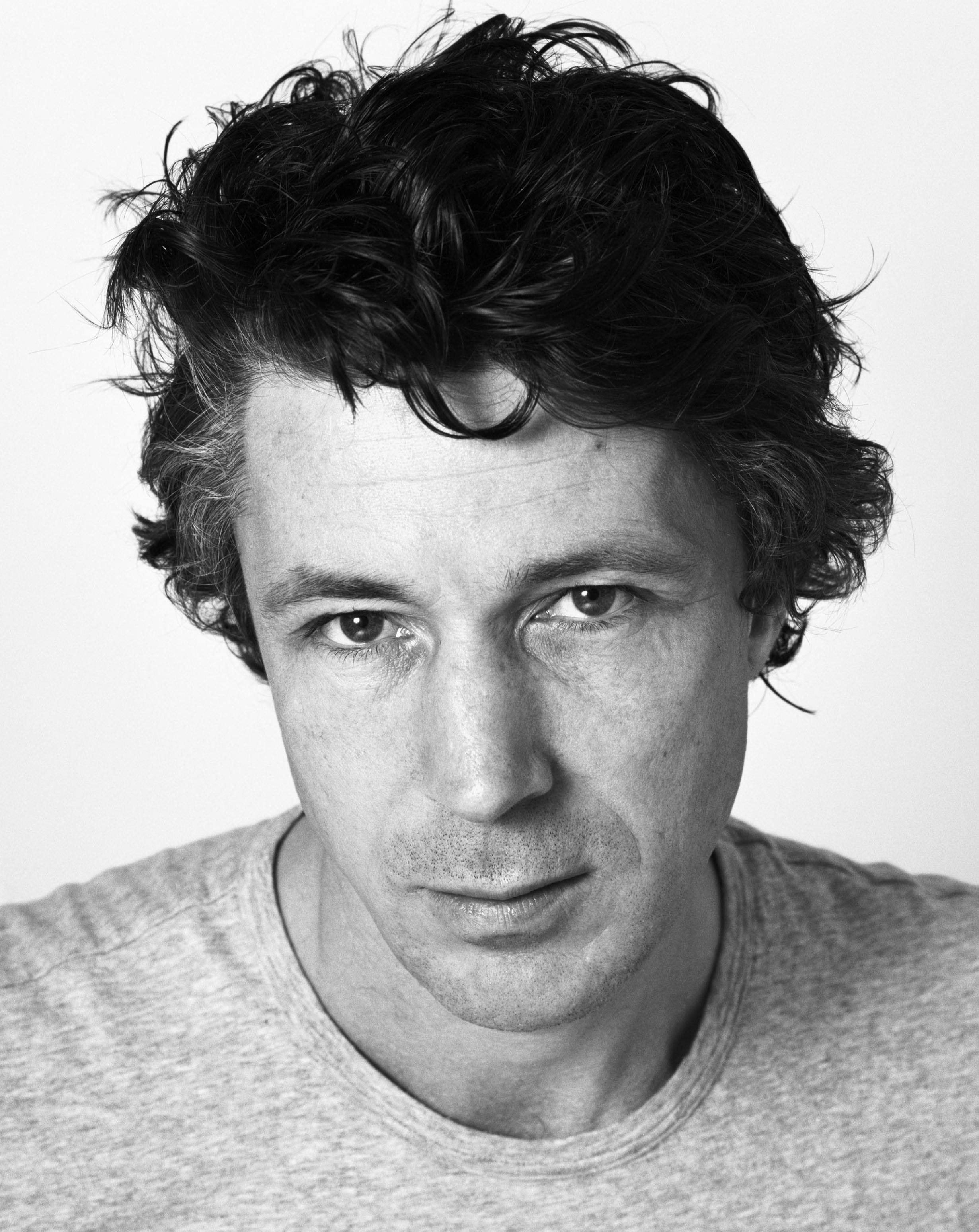
Aidan Gillen

Aberama Gold (portrayed by Aidan Gillen) is a Romani gypsy hitman-for-hire and head of a respected Romani family. He is hired by Tommy Shelby when Luca Changretta arrives in England seeking revenge on the Shelby family.

Aberama insists that, in addition to payment, Tommy help his son, Bonnie Gold, become a boxing champion in exchange for his services. Meanwhile, he becomes romantically involved with Polly Gray, and they become engaged. After Bonnie’s death, Aberama seeks revenge on Jimmy McCavern. During an ambush on McCavern in the fifth series, he is killed by the IRA.

=== Luca Changretta ===
Adrien Brody

Luca Changretta (portrayed by Adrien Brody) is an Italian-American mobster from New York and the leader of the Changretta family. After his father and brother are killed by the Peaky Blinders, Luca embarks on a revenge mission against the Shelby family. During the fourth series, he is shot in the forehead by Arthur Shelby, who was avenging his brother, John.

=== Jessie Eden ===
Jessie Eden (portrayed by Charlie Murphy) is a trade union leader of one of Tommy Shelby's factories and a member of the British Communist Party. In the fourth series, she organises a citywide strike at the Bull Ring, led by female spot welding and wire cutting workers who demand better working conditions, fair wages, and improved sanitation for women in factories. Among those who join the protest are Polly Gray, Esme Shelby, and Lizzie Shelby, encouraged to participate by Linda Shelby. Her character is based on the activist by the same name.

=== Gina Gray ===
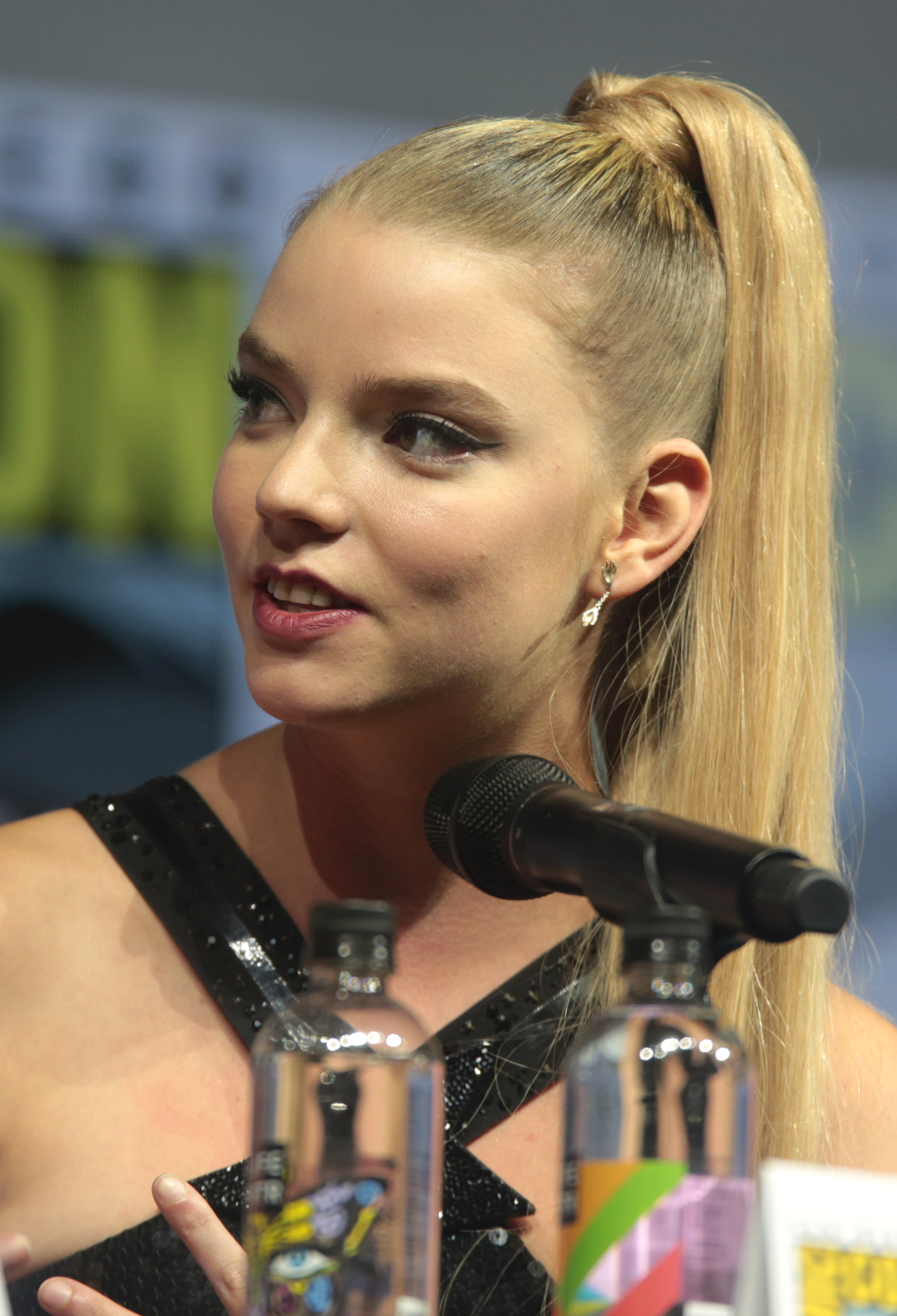
Anya Taylor-Joy

Gina Gray (née Nelson) (portrayed by Anya Taylor-Joy) is the wife of Michael Gray. The two met in the United States. After returning to Birmingham in the aftermath of the Wall Street Crash, Gina manipulates Michael into attempting to take control of the Shelby company. After Tommy rejects his proposal, both Gina and Michael are exiled from the Shelby family.

The couple then moves to Boston, where, during the sixth series, Gina gives birth to their son, Laurence. In the series finale, she conspires with Michael to kill Tommy, though she insists Arthur must die too, and even suggests Tommy’s children be killed.

=== Oswald Mosley ===
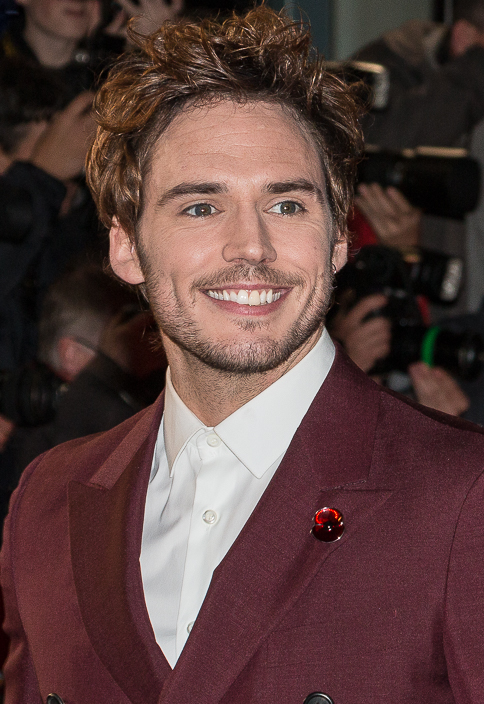
Sam Claflin

Sir Oswald Mosley (portrayed by Sam Claflin) is the Minister of the Duchy of Lancaster, the deputy to the Chancellor of the Exchequer, and the Cabinet adviser to the Prime Minister of Great Britain. His political career leads him into alliances with fascist groups, and he marries Diana Mitford at Joseph Goebbels' home in a ceremony attended by Adolf Hitler. His character is based on the historical figure by the same name.

=== Jimmy McCavern ===
Jimmy McCavern (portrayed by Brian Gleeson) is the anti-Catholic, anti-Gypsy leader of the Billy Boys and a member of the Glasgow razor gang. He is a cruel man known for using extreme violence to make a statement, like when he murders and crucifies Bonnie Gold without remorse to send a message to Tommy.

=== Barney Thomason ===
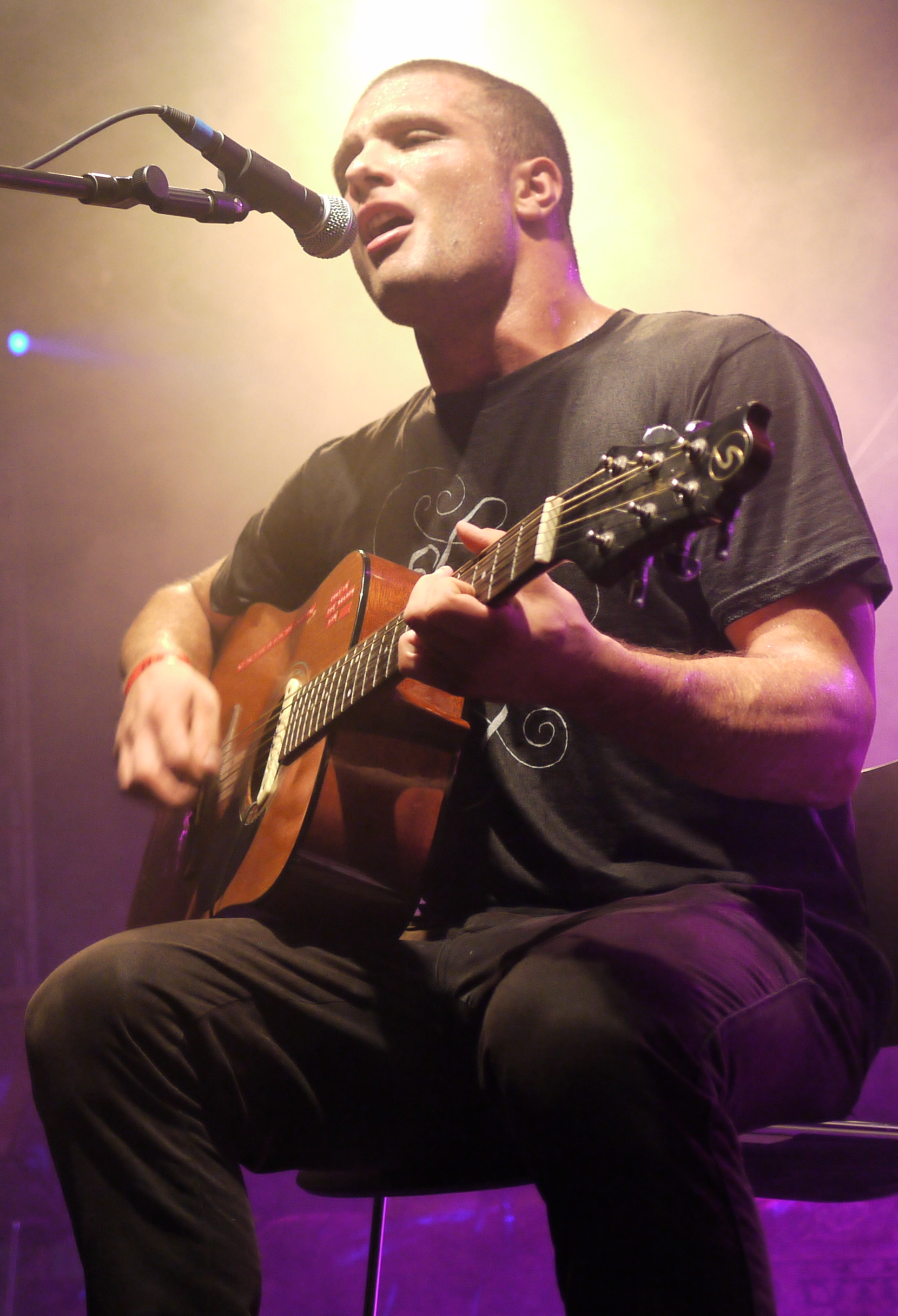
Cosmo Jarvis

Barney Thomason (portrayed by Cosmo Jarvis) is a former comrade and old friend of Tommy Shelby. He was trained by the Royal Marines and served as a sniper in World War I, gaining a reputation as a marksman who never misses his target. After the war, Barney was admitted to a mental asylum for shell shock. Throughout the show, he is prone to manic episodes and hearing voices.

In the fifth series, he plays a key role in the assassination attempt on Oswald Mosley at a rally at Bingley Hall. He is killed by a silenced pistol just moments before he can take the shot, with his killer remaining a mystery.

=== Jack Nelson ===
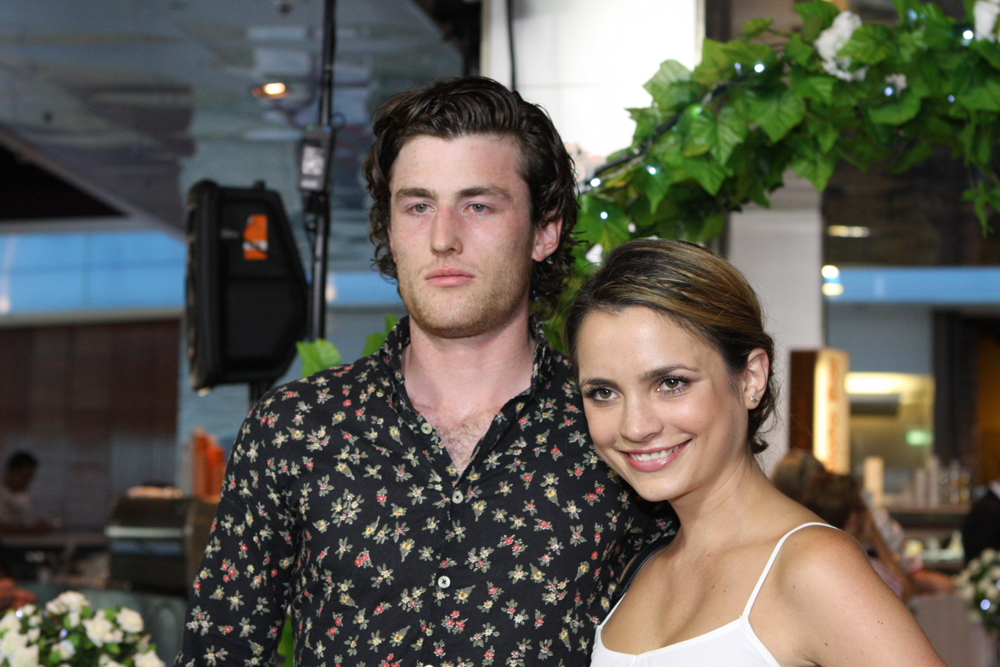
James Frecheville

Jack Nelson (portrayed by James Frecheville) is an Irish-American gangster with strong political connections, including ties to President Roosevelt. His rise to power mirrors that of Tommy Shelby: both men come from poor, violent backgrounds and claw their way to the top through ambition and ruthlessness, resulting in a mutual respect between the two. The first man he kills is a priest, marking the beginning of his journey in the criminal underworld. Eventually, he gains significant power and is considered equal in stature to the Peaky Blinders.

Despite his violent history, he identifies as a Catholic with fascist leanings and expresses strong resentment toward the mistreatment of his people in America.

During the sixth series, he plans to acquire US import licences for the finest Scotch and Irish whiskey distilleries, solidifying his control over the lucrative alcohol trade. He also forms an alliance with the IRA, with both parties engaged in an opium deal brokered by Tommy Shelby.

=== Laura McKee ===
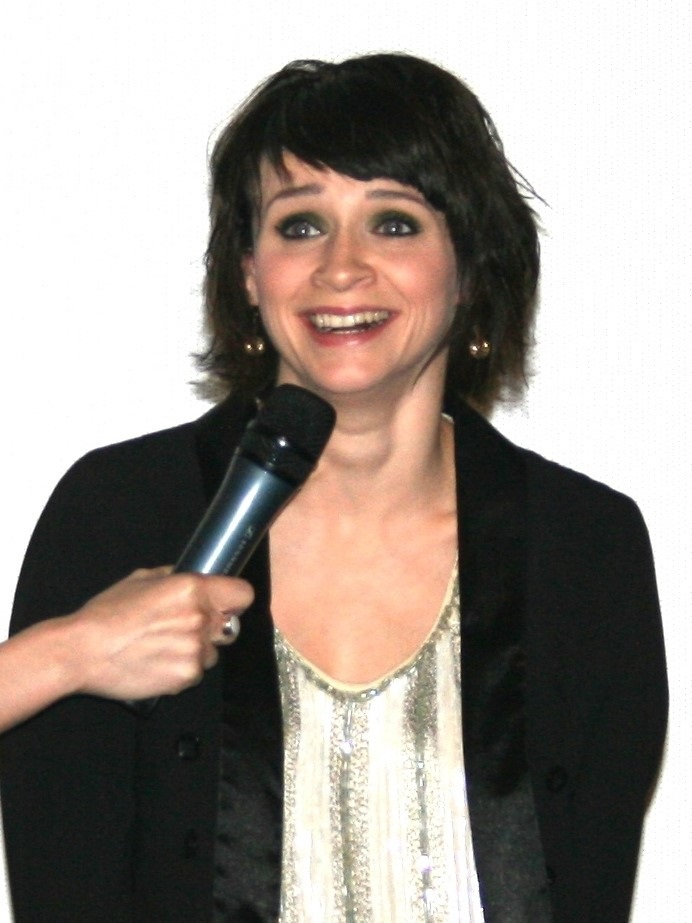
Charlene McKenna

Laura McKee, also known by her alias Captain Swing (portrayed by Charlene McKenna), is a high-ranking member of the Irish Republican Army and serves as the Battalion Commander of the Fermanagh branch. In the fifth series, she calls Tommy Shelby to inform him that her forces have captured Michael Gray in Ireland after intercepting a group attempting to kill him during his journey back to the United Kingdom.

In the sixth series, she contacts Tommy again following the failed assassination attempt on Oswald Mosley. She claims responsibility, not for the attempt, but for its failure, and for the murders of Barney Thomason and Aberama Gold. To make her message clear, she has their bodies delivered to Tommy’s home, along with that of his aunt, Polly Gray. She is killed by Arthur Shelby outside the Garrison Pub soon after.

=== Duke Shelby ===
Erasmus "Duke" Shelby (portrayed by Conrad Khan and Barry Keoghan) is the illegitimate firstborn son of Tommy Shelby and a Romani woman named Zelda, conceived before the former left to fight in World War I. He was raised solely by his mother. Soon after her death, he joined other Gypsies on the road, working at a fairground before eventually turning to theft.

He is the half-brother of Charles and Ruby Shelby. He grew up believing that his father was the Duke of the Saxon Shore, inspiring him to adopt the name Duke. He resents being called by his birth name. In the sixth series, he is introduced to Tommy by Esme and welcomed into the Shelby family. He is responsible for the execution of Billy Grade.

=== Billy Grade ===
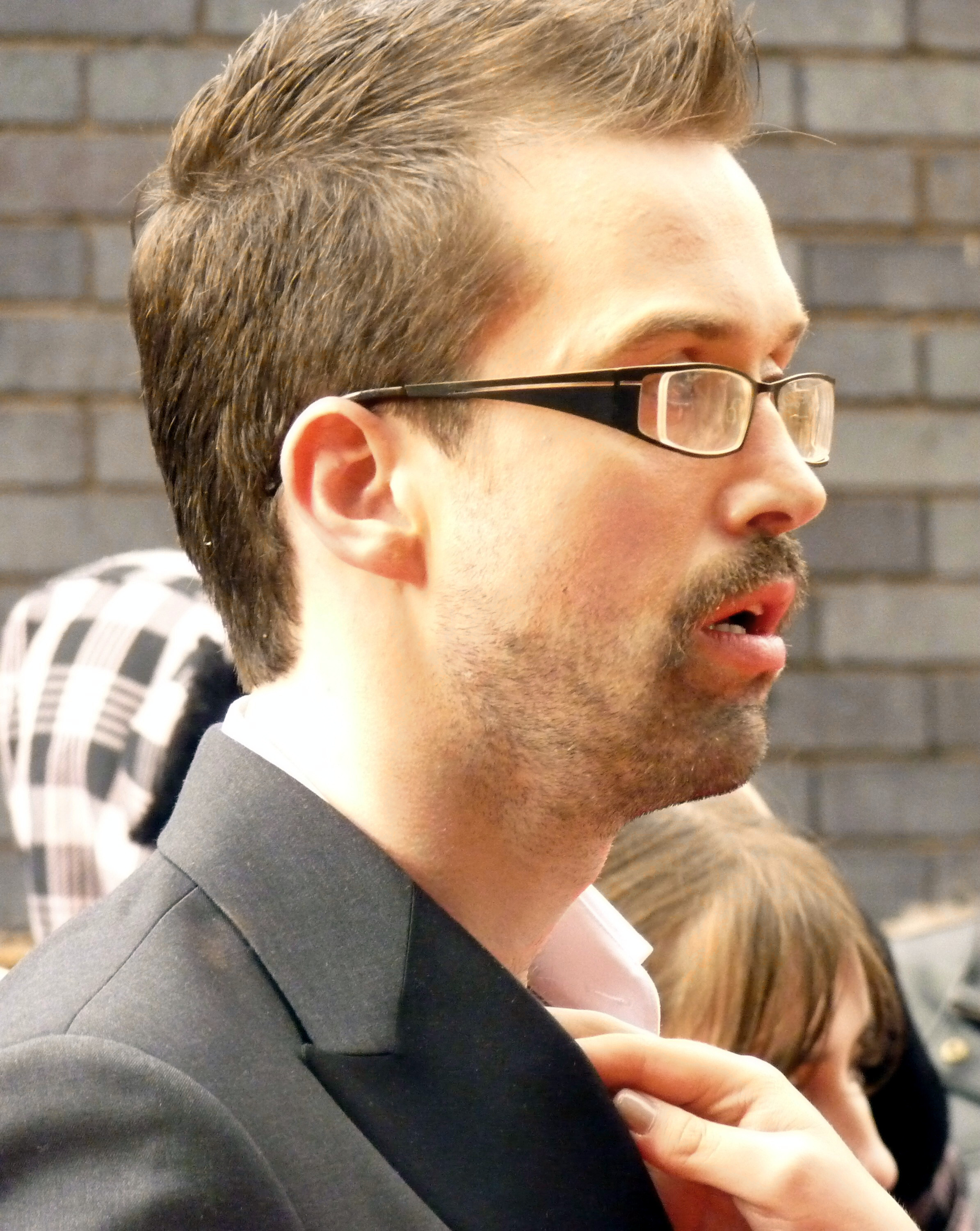
Emmett J. Scanlan

Billy Grade (portrayed by Emmett J. Scanlan) is a former professional Irish footballer who works as a singer at the Garrison Pub and a bookmaker for the Peaky Blinders. During the fifth series, he forms a close friendship with Finn Shelby, and the two spend time using cocaine and drinking heavily while managing the betting shop. The older Shelbys come to suspect Billy of being an informant. Their suspicions are confirmed when Finn, in a moment of indiscretion, reveals the Peaky Blinders’ plan to assassinate Oswald Mosley. Billy immediately tips off the IRA, compromising the mission.

In the sixth series, Jack Nelson coerces Billy into becoming his informant within the Peaky Blinders. Under his orders, Billy provides Arthur Shelby with information that will facilitate his elimination. Ultimately, Billy’s betrayal catches up with him. Acting on Tommy Shelby’s orders, Duke Shelby and Isiah Jesus brutally beat and execute him.

== Supporting characters ==
=== Charlie Strong ===
Charlie Strong (portrayed by Ned Dennehy) is the uncle of the Shelby siblings. He helps them organise their stocks and prepare their illegal shipments. As a close friend of their mother, Charlie is one of the family’s most trusted allies.

=== Roberts ===
Roberts (portrayed by David Dawson) is Billy Kimber’s accountant. He appears when Kimber storms into the Garrison Pub to confront the Shelby brothers about fixing the horse races in the first series. Later, he presents Tommy with the Shelby family’s first legal betting licence.

=== Arthur Shelby Sr. ===
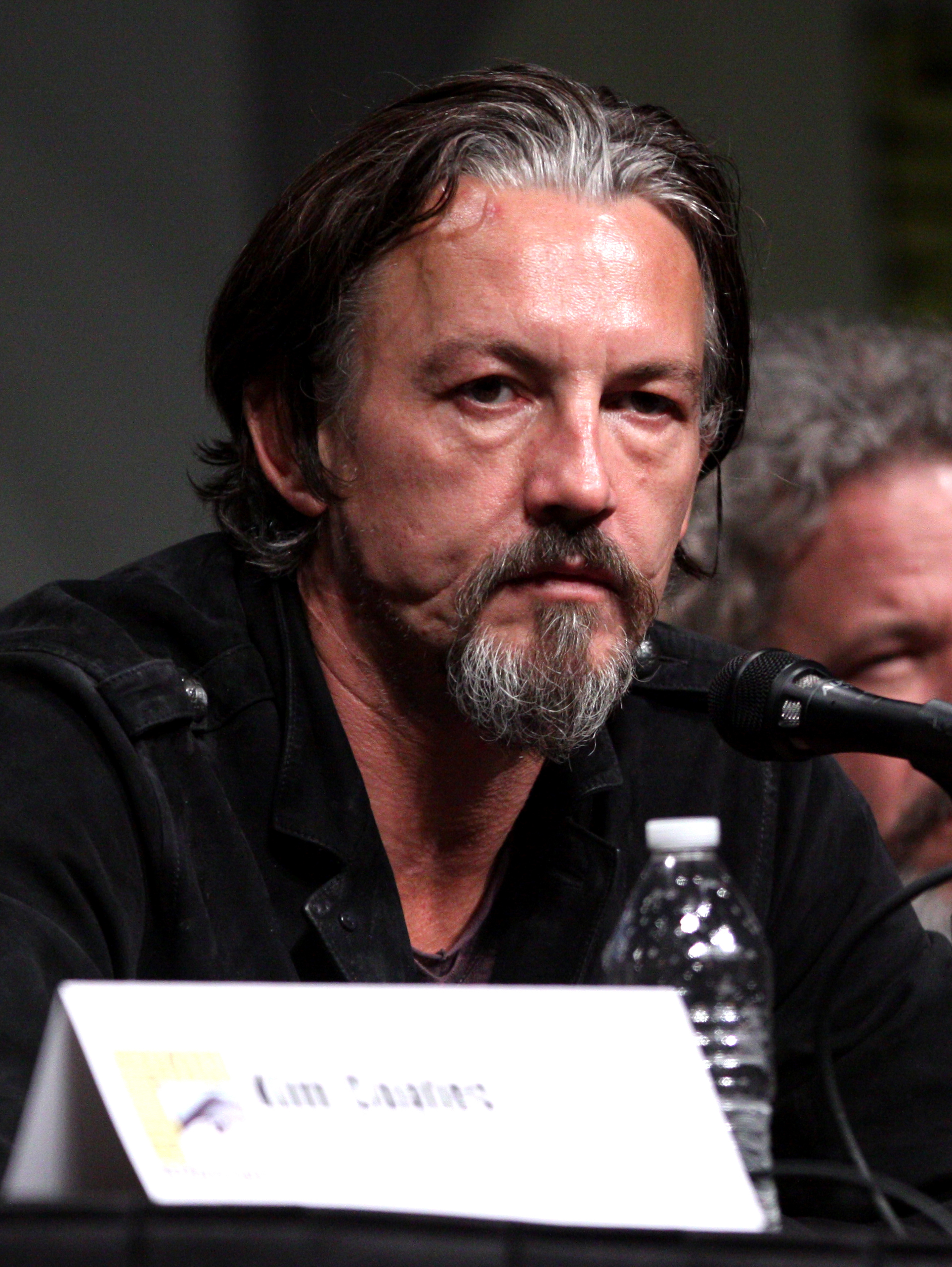
Tommy Flanagan

Arthur William Shelby Sr. (portrayed by Tommy Flanagan) is the estranged father of the Shelby siblings. During the third series, he is shot in Boston after leaving a bar. Having grown up without him and only remembering his failures, the children are not saddened by his death.

=== Curly ===
Curly (portrayed by Ian Peck) is a Gypsy stable boy and ferryman working in Charlie Strong's Yard. Tommy Shelby praises him to May Carleton as the best horseman in England. He walks with a limp, the result of an old leg injury.

=== Johnny Dogs ===
Johnny Dogs (portrayed by Packy Lee) is a Romani cousin to the Shelby family through marriage and a friend of Tommy's. He is also loosely allied with the Lee family throughout the show.

=== Jeremiah Jesus ===
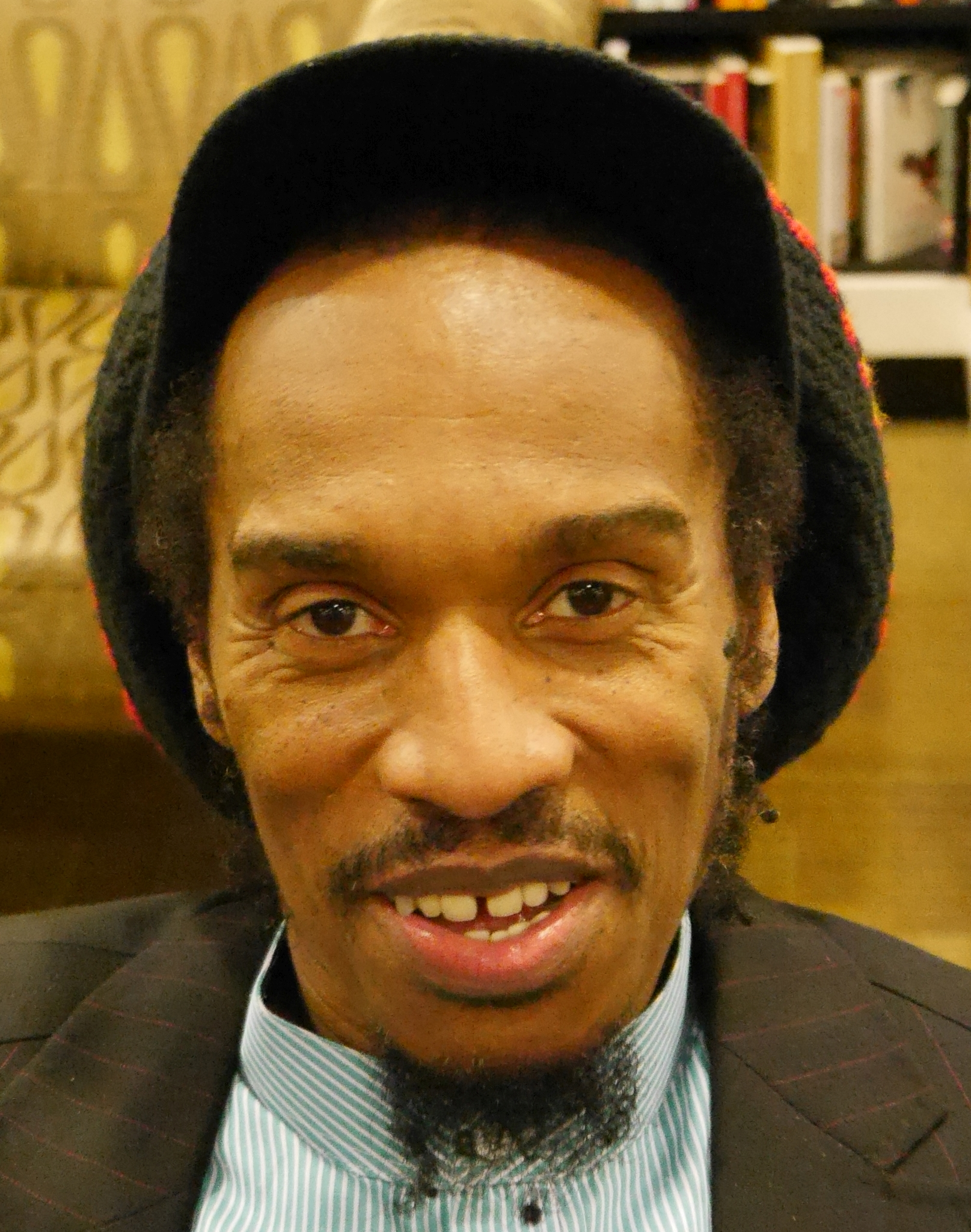
Benjamin Zephaniah

Jeremiah "Jimmy" Jesus (portrayed by Benjamin Zephaniah) is a Jamaican-born street preacher. He is close friends and allies with Tommy and the Peaky Blinders. He is also the father of Isiah Jesus.

=== May Carleton ===
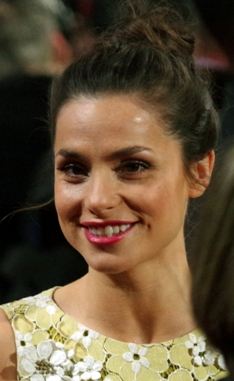
Charlotte Riley

May Carleton (portrayed by Charlotte Riley) is a wealthy widow and skilled racehorse trainer. She owns the Carleton stud and comes from a privileged background. During the second series, she agrees to train Tommy’s horse for Epsom. Despite her success, May lives a lonely life in her late husband’s mansion.

=== Leon Petrovich Romanov ===
Grand Duke Leon Petrovich Romanov (portrayed by Jan Bijvoet) is the husband of Grand Duchess Izabella and the uncle of Princess Tatiana. Having been forced to flee Russia after the revolution, he now resides at the Ritz in England. During the third series, he pays Tommy for the assassination of Anton Kaledin and proposes further business, all while secretly planning to kill him once he has served his purpose.

=== Izabella Petrovna ===
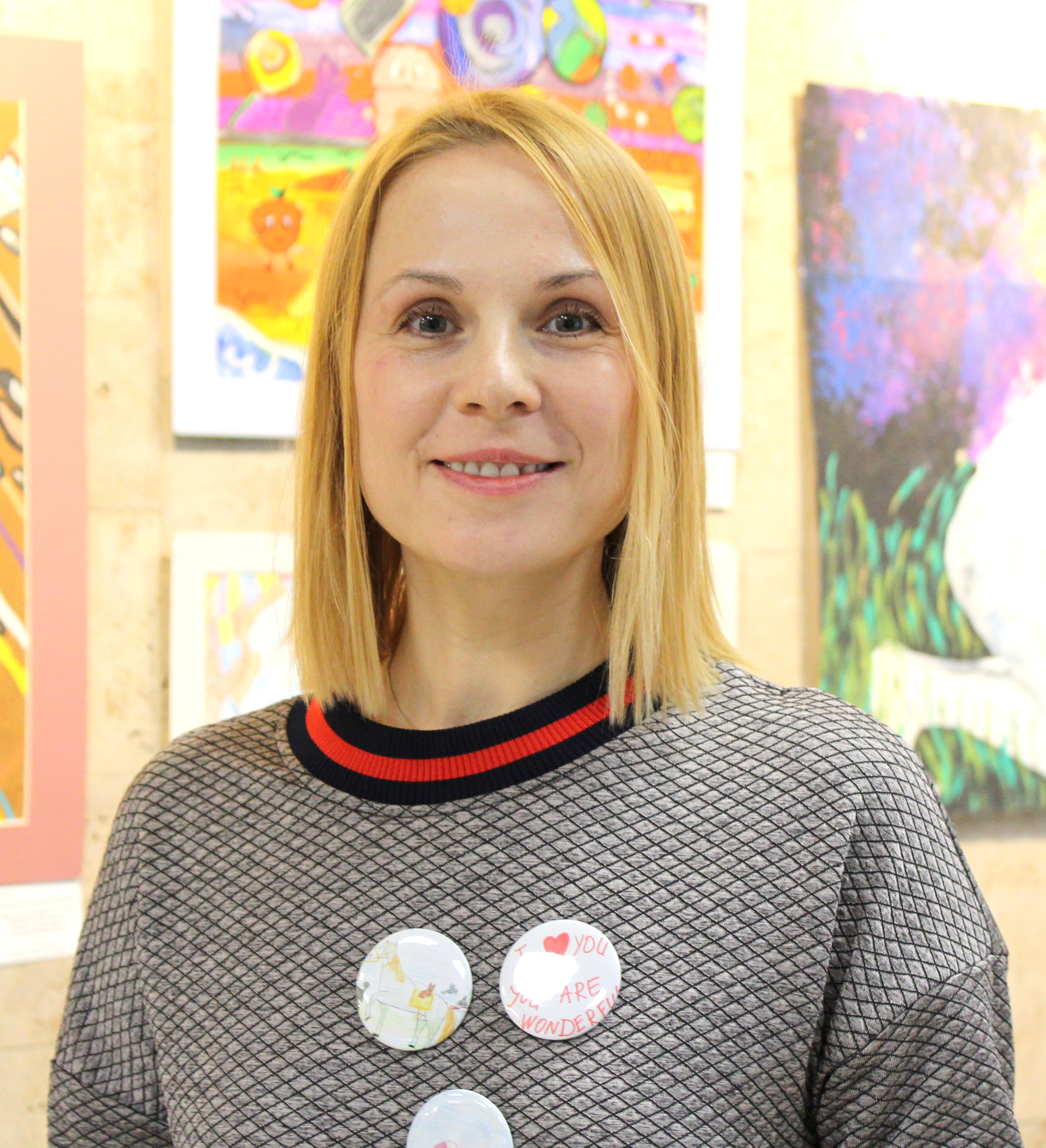
Dina Korzun

Grand Duchess Izabella Petrovna (portrayed by Dina Korzun) is the wife of Grand Duke Leon Petrovich Romanov and aunt of Princess Tatiana. She flees Russia after the revolution and, along with her husband and niece, takes refuge at the Ritz.

=== Ruben Oliver ===
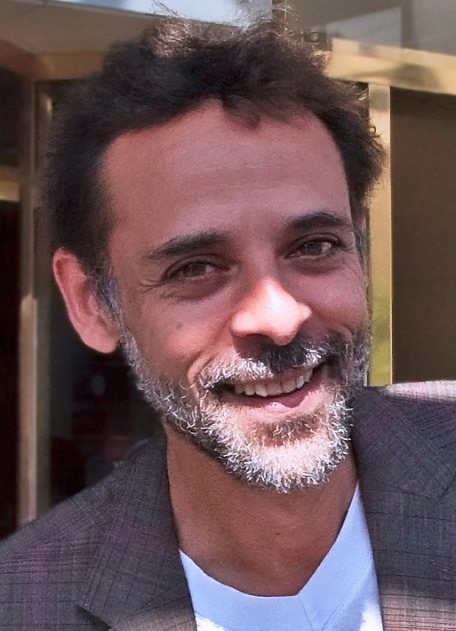
Alexander Siddig

Ruben Oliver (portrayed by Alexander Siddig) is a portrait artist who has an affair with Polly Gray. When Charles Shelby is kidnapped during the third series, Tommy convinces Polly that Ruben betrayed her. He, however, insists that he is innocent.

=== Bonnie Gold ===
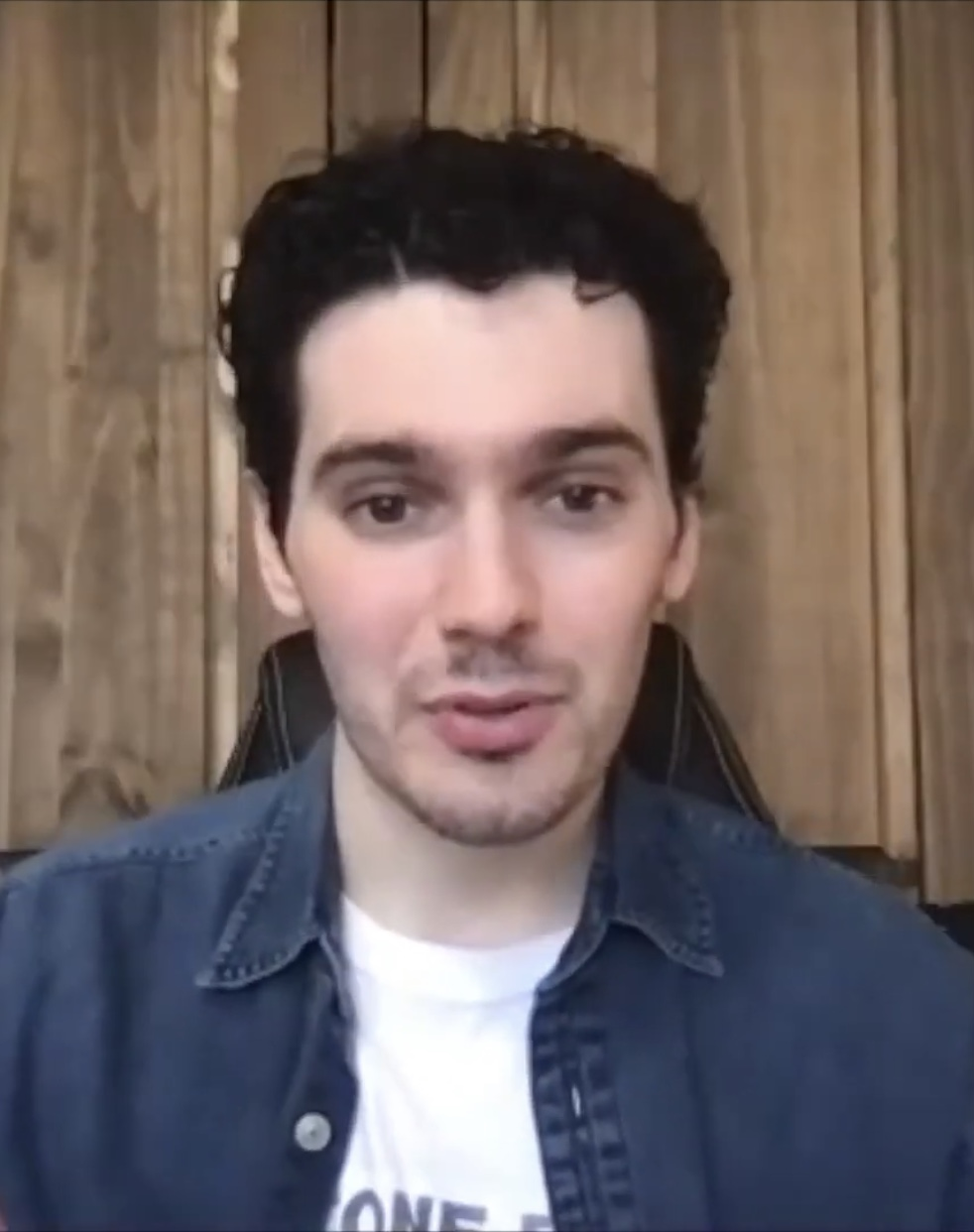
Jack Rowan

Bonnie Gold (portrayed by Jack Rowan) is the son of Aberama Gold and a talented young Gypsy fighter with ambitions of professional boxing. During the fifth series, he earns his place as a Peaky Blinder, but is killed by Jimmy McCavern shortly after.

=== Ben Younger ===
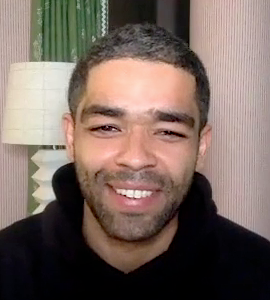
Kingsley Ben-Adir

Ben Younger (portrayed by Kingsley Ben-Adir) is a colonel and head of army intelligence. He arrives in Birmingham and arrests Ada Shelby for her communist history. He works closely with Tommy throughout the fifth series and is killed after receiving sensitive information about Oswald Mosley's assassination. Before his death, Ben had a brief, secret relationship with Ada Shelby, resulting in pregnancy. Ben died never knowing Ada was pregnant. Ada gives birth to a daughter named Elizabeth "Betty" Younger following Ben's death.

=== Frances ===
Frances (portrayed by Pauline Turner) is the housekeeper of Arrow House, employed during the Shelby family's imprisonment. She tends to the household and cares for Tommy's two-year-old son, Charles. During the sixth series, she attends Tommy's farewell meal at Arrow House before its demolition.

=== Mother Superior ===
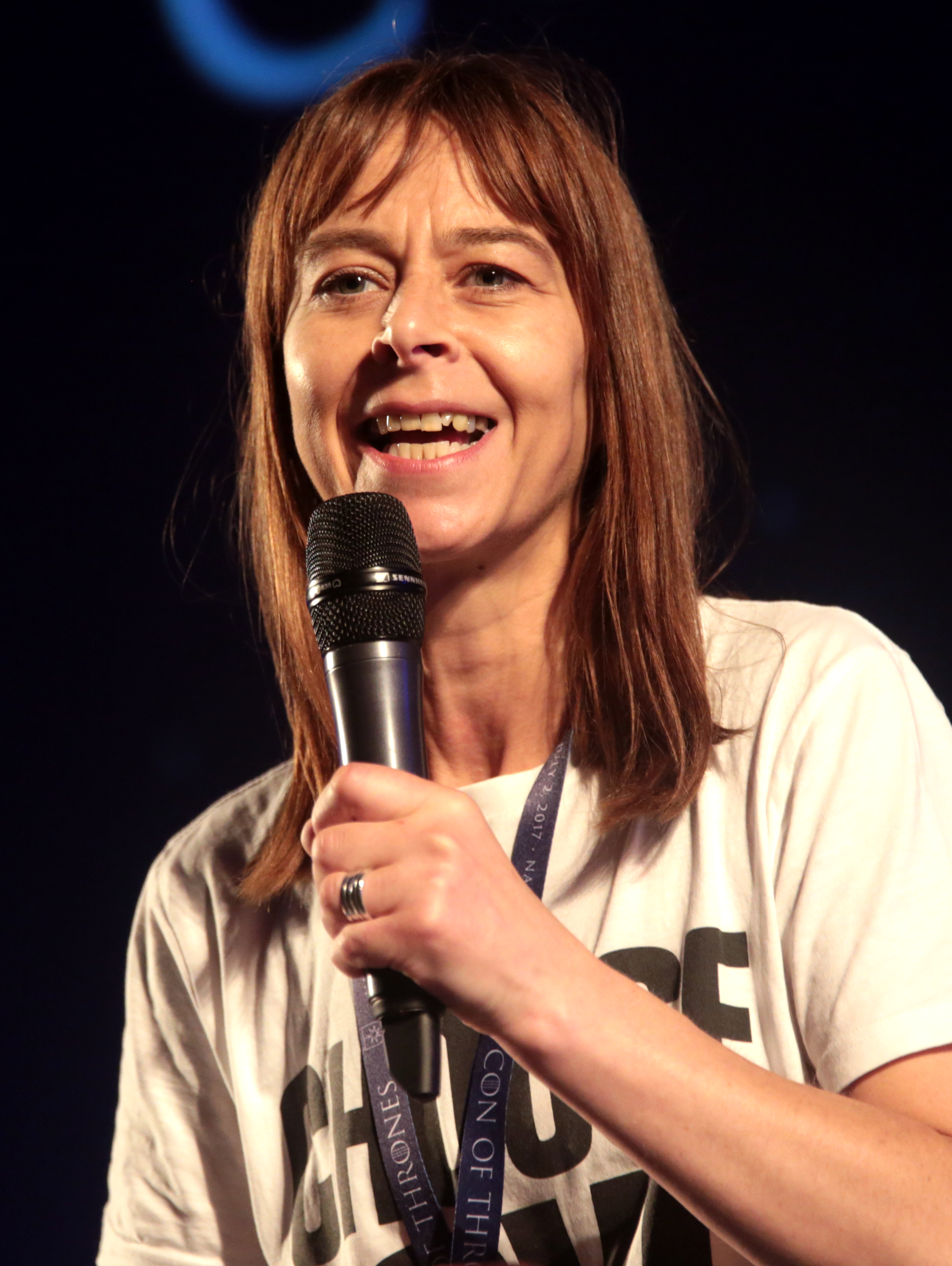
Kate Dickie

Mother Superior (portrayed by Kate Dickie) is the head nun of the orphanage supported by the Shelby Company. When Tommy and Polly confront her about child abuse in season 5, she shows no remorse. Tommy, enraged, tells her that he is aware that a black child killed herself because of her cruelty.

=== Brilliant Chang ===
Brilliant Chang (portrayed by Andrew Koji) is a Chinese opium supplier to the Peaky Blinders, based on the historical figure by the same name. He is first seen at the Garrison during the fifth series, when he negotiates with Thomas and Arthur Shelby while sending a prostitute to Finn Shelby's office. Later, Arthur and Aberama Gold find him injured at the docks, following an ambush by the Irish Titanic mob when they go to collect a cargo shipment.

=== Diana Mitford ===
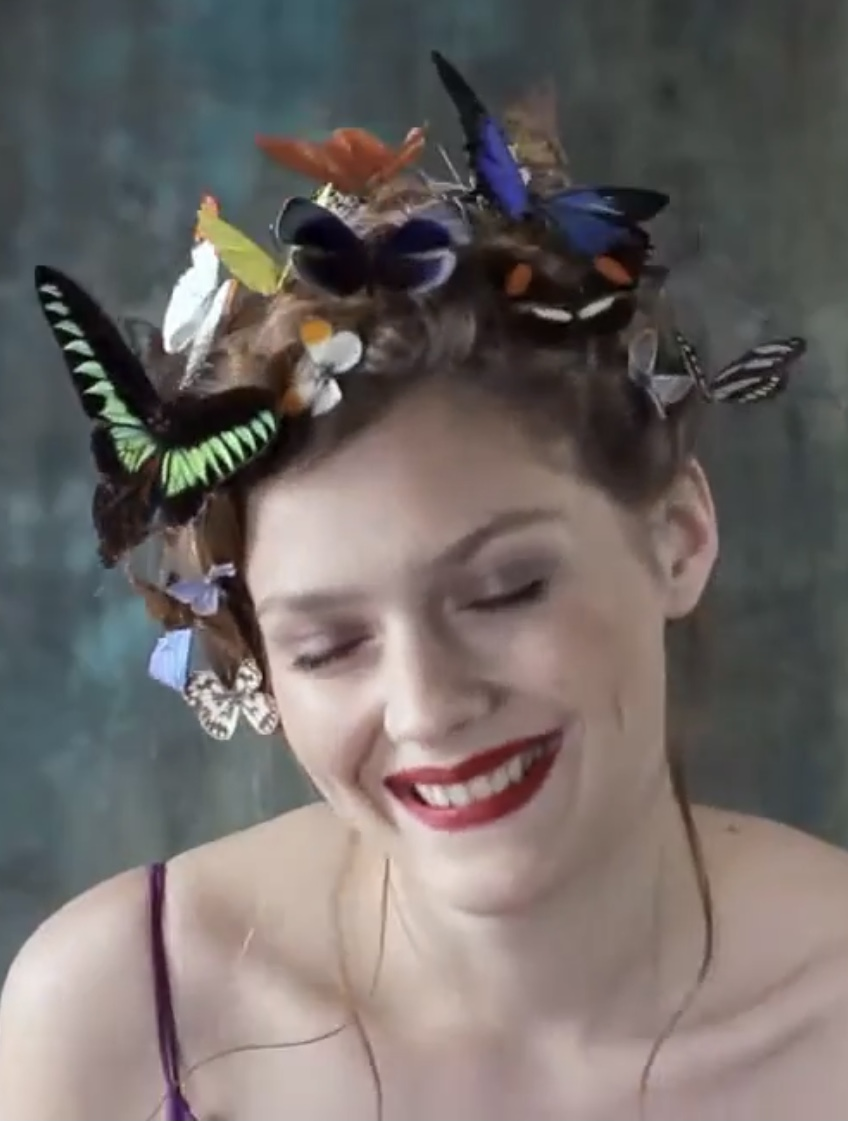
Amber Anderson

Lady Diana Mitford (portrayed by Amber Anderson) is the mistress and, later, the second wife of Oswald Mosley. She has a brief affair with Tommy Shelby before marrying Mosley at Joseph Goebbels' home, with Adolf Hitler in attendance, during the sixth series.

=== Hayden Stagg ===
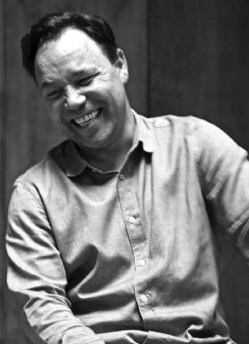
Stephen Graham

Hayden Stagg (portrayed by Stephen Graham) is a union convenor in Liverpool who steals opium from the storage at Salthouse Docks in the sixth series. When Arthur, Isiah, and their cousins from Alum Rock uncover the leak, they confront him directly.
