= Arthur Shelby Jr. =

Fictional character from Peaky Blinders

- Peaky Blinders character
- Paul Anderson as Arthur Shelby Jr.
- First appearance: "Episode 1.1" (2013)
- Last appearance: "Lock and Key" (2022)
- Created by: Steven Knight
- Portrayed by: Paul Anderson

In-universe information
- Occupation: Soldier (1914–1918); Bookmaker; Career Criminal; Gangster; Boxer; Businessman
- Family: Arthur Shelby Sr. (father; deceased); Polly Gray (aunt; deceased); Thomas Shelby (younger brother; deceased); John Shelby (younger brother; deceased); Finn Shelby (younger brother); Ada Thorne (younger sister; deceased); Freddie Thorne (brother-in-law; deceased); Linda Shelby (wife); Billy Shelby (son); Duke Shelby (nephew); Karl Thorne (nephew); Charles Shelby (nephew); Katie Shelby (niece); Ruby Shelby (niece; deceased); Elizabeth Younger (niece); Martha Shelby (sister-in-law; deceased); Esme Shelby (sister-in-law); Grace Shelby (sister-in-law; deceased); Lizzie Shelby (sister-in-law); Mary Shelby (sister-in-law)
- Home: Small Heath, Birmingham, United Kingdom
- Date of birth: 14 March 1895
- Date of death: 2 December 1938

Arthur Shelby Jr. is a fictional character in the British television period crime drama television series Peaky Blinders, created by Steven Knight. Played by Paul Anderson, Arthur Shelby Jr. is the older brother of the protagonist Thomas Shelby. Arthur is a member of the Peaky Blinders and the deputy vice-president of the Shelby Company Limited.

Although the television series is set in Birmingham, the cottage where the character of Arthur Shelby lived is actually located not far from Liverpool, in the village of Rostherne near Tatton Park in Cheshire.

== Casting ==
In a 2017 interview with Den of Geek, Paul Anderson said he was originally up for the role of Tommy Shelby in Peaky Blinders, but was offered the part of Arthur instead.

Anderson said he was drawn to the role by the script, the writer, and the director, Otto Bathurst. He also said he was interested in playing a dark character, and that he enjoyed playing a character with flaws and violent tendencies.

Anderson says he enjoys playing Arthur because, "he's not just one-dimensional – he's tough and he can be violent and brutal, but he's not just that. He's got this inner turmoil." He also says that the role has a lot of scope, allowing him to play different layers of the character.

== Character biography ==
=== Early life ===
Arthur Shelby Jr. was born on March 14, 1895, into a Romani and Irish traveller family. Growing up, Arthur regularly wrestled with his siblings and was known as the strongest. He once got beaten by Tommy, and he also once held off 12 police officers with a boat hook, showing that he let Tommy win.

=== First World War ===
Arthur's experience during the First World War and the Battle of the Somme fundamentally alters his personality.

During the war in France, Arthur was a sapper with his brother Thomas, digging very treacherous tunnels in order to place enormous amounts of explosives under enemy positions – a tactic used several times in the war to devastating effect at both the Battle of Verdun and the Battle of the Somme. It is suggested he may have served at Gallipoli through his distaste for Turks and the smell of stagnant water.

== Storylines ==
=== Series 1 (1919) ===
Arthur is thirty-two years old. After returning from France, Arthur feels that he should be the head of the family business. However, he cannot command the necessary authority, and Thomas slowly starts to assume leadership. Thomas has taken over the Peaky Blinders, and Arthur feels like he is losing his sense of purpose.

When Chief Inspector Campbell comes to Birmingham, Arthur is arrested, beaten, and questioned as the assumed leader of the gang, but he knows nothing about any stolen machine guns.

Eventually, Arthur Shelby confronts Thomas, telling him that he has no idea what is going on. Thomas tells him that the Peaky Blinders have the stolen guns and takes him to The Garrison Pub, which is now under Arthur's ownership.

Arthur continues to show his lack of guile when he hints to his barmaid, Grace Shelby, that Danny Whizz-Bang is alive, allowing her to surmise that Danny's grave is where the Peaky Blinders have hidden the guns.

When his father, Arthur Shelby Sr., comes back to Birmingham, Arthur takes the opportunity to prove to everyone that he knows business just as well as Thomas. He gives his father money without the permission of Thomas or Aunt Polly, but soon realises that his father is a selfish liar. Arthur tries to confront his father before he leaves for good, but becomes intimidated by the man's strength and anger, knowing that he will not win a fight against him.

The events cause Arthur to re-evaluate himself, and as a result, he attempts suicide by hanging himself. The plan fails when the rope tears from the hook.

Arthur and the rest of the Peaky Blinders eventually confront their rival Billy Kimber and help to clean Thomas's wounds after the shooting.

=== Series 2 (1922) ===
In series 2, Arthur struggles with PTSD and kills a young boy in the boxing ring by beating him to death. He is later confronted in The Garrison Pub by Mrs. Ross, the mother of the boy he killed. She pulls a gun on him, but it misfires and shoots the mirror behind the bar. Arthur lunges towards her, empties the gun of bullets, and tells her that she will be compensated financially.

Arthur accompanies Thomas and the gang to the auctions to buy a racehorse, thus giving them a credible reason to infiltrate the racecourses dominated by their London rival, Darby Sabini. When assassins try to kill Thomas, the same uncontrollable rage takes over Arthur, who brutally beats one of the assailants.

In London, Arthur, whose cocaine habit is worrying his younger brother, leads the Blinders in tearing up the Eden Club belonging to Sabini, which they plan to take over quite hostilely.

Later, Arthur and John are drinking in The Garrison Pub when his Aunt Polly's, son Michael Gray, and Jeremiah Jesus' son, Isiah, come in, telling them of a scuffle they had in The Marquis of Lorne. Arthur and his brother John burn the pub to the ground with the barman inside to protect the reputation of the Peaky Blinders.

When their supposed ally Alfie Solomons invites Arthur and Billy Kitchen over for Passover at the distillery, things escalate rather quickly after Alfie sacrifices the goat named after Thomas. Alfie shoots Billy Kitchen in the head, and his men tie up Arthur to wait for the police to haul him off to jail, blamed for the murder.

In prison, Arthur is beaten badly. He gets a visit from his brother John, who tells him that Thomas has plans to get him released.

Thomas negotiates a deal with Alfie to have the murder charge against Arthur withdrawn just in time to join the Blinders and the Lees heading off to the races.

At the Epsom Derby, Thomas assassinates Field Marshal Henry Russell, which creates the diversion that Arthur and the gang need to hold up Sabini's bookmakers and burn their licenses while the police are distracted.

=== Series 3 (1924) ===
Arthur meets a woman named Linda. Due to Linda's family background, he finds some kind of faith in God (the Old Testament). It is shown that Linda is carrying his child, who is later named Billy Shelby. He and Linda envision a life in California, away from their strained life in Small Heath. After becoming more and more religious, he is shown to be a lot more compassionate and calm; this leads to him seeming weaker by the rest of the Peaky Blinders, and he is often picked on by John Shelby and Thomas Shelby. He seems embarrassed about this, and as shown in Episode 3.2, he did participate in the fight outside one of the bars, but washed his hands and went straight home. He was then shouted at and mocked by John Shelby. Despite his passionate love for Linda and her beliefs, he engages in infidelity and drug abuse. Due to John's fight with the Changretta family and Tommy's encouragement to go to war, Arthur and John capture Vincente Changretta. Just as Tommy was going to kill him slowly, Arthur pulls the trigger to make his death less painful, an action that really shows Arthur's development. Like the rest of the Shelbys, besides Tommy, Arthur is arrested by the police and taken away at the end of season 3, unable to escape to California with Linda.

=== Series 4 (1925–1926) ===
As the whole Shelby family is preparing to be hanged, Arthur is tense but calm about the situation. Because of the deal Tommy made with the British government, they were all saved from death in the last second. Arthur returns to working for the Shelby Company when the whole Shelby family receives a Black Hand from Luca Changretta, whose alliance is the New York mafia, in retaliation for the murder of his father. As war begins between the Italians and the Blinders, John is killed on Christmas morning, 1925, by Italian gunmen.

Arthur is very moved by the death of his brother, John, and feels guilty. He swears to be the one to kill Luca Changretta, but Linda and her faith in God stop him from doing so, leaving the task to Tommy. As Arthur is running one of the Shelby Company business buildings, two Italian men sneak in and attempt to kill him, but Arthur luckily survives. As the Shelby Company invests in a Gipsy boxing talent, Bonnie Gold, Arthur gets suspicious about a man at an important boxing match against Solomon's fighter. When the man leaves the fighting arena, Arthur follows him and is seemingly mortally wounded. Arthur and Tommy plan to make everyone believe that Arthur is dead so that he can attack Luca. At his funeral, Thomas is approached by the mother of the Changretta family, who demands all enterprises of the Shelby Company be handed over to Luca. When the deal is about to be made, Thomas outruns Luca by making a deal with the other New York mafia families, specifically Alphonse Capone. All of Luca's blood-related men have been killed in Birmingham, so the rest of the men agreed to change sides. As Luca realises he has lost the vendetta, he attacks Tommy, only to see Arthur walk right in and shoot him, avenging his brother's death. With many believing Arthur is dead, he has the chance to pursue a new identity but chooses to stay in Birmingham and remain a partner of the Shelby Company Limited.

=== Series 5 (1929) ===
The series begins with the Wall Street crash. Arthur has assumed the position of chairman of the board following Tommy's leave of absence and convenes a meeting when he hears of the crash. Arthur tries to preside over the meeting, but—much to Linda's dismay—Polly suggests that they should wait for Tommy's return before making any decisions. Arthur is happy to know that the company is not lost, as they have diversified their portfolio and have investments all over the world. After Michael returns to Birmingham following the wall street crash with his new wife Gina, Michael has a tense standoff in the street l, with Arthur insulting Michael and calling him a smelly dog due to his believing Michael is a traitor.

As the year goes on, Arthur and Linda begin to have relationship trouble, mostly because Linda does not believe Arthur is leading the company the right way and fears losing control of the finances. Despite this, Arthur warns Linda to be a good wife and let him deal with everything else, essentially silencing her. This leads to Linda looking for a way to divorce Arthur; however, she is shocked to find that nobody in Birmingham will divorce a Shelby and seeks out Lizzie for advice. Lizzie admits that she will have to go to London to divorce a Shelby.

Things between the two become more strained when Mosley reveals that he has heard news that Linda has been spotted with another man while being married to Arthur. This angers Arthur, who hunts down the man and slashes his face, seemingly leaving him dead. He is later confronted by Linda, who is angry as all she did was talk to the man. Linda pulls a gun on Arthur, but is shot by Polly Gray before she has a chance to pull the trigger. After the bullet is removed, Arthur pleads with Linda to leave Peaky's life behind and run away with him; however, she declines, admitting that she is thankful she did not kill him as death would be too good for him.

Forgetting about Linda, Arthur witnesses Michael's plan to restructure the company with his wife Gina and him in charge and the rest of the family retiring. Arthur is privy to the plan to assassinate Oswald Mosley, playing a key role in arming Alfie Solomons' men. He also takes charge of ensuring Barney is in position with a clear line of fire at Mosley, reiterating that the plan is to shoot Mosley after Tommy gives the go-ahead. When the plan fails, however, Arthur takes Tommy home, expressing his concern that Tommy is slowly losing his mind.

=== Series 6 (1934) ===
Through the series, Arthur has a severe opium addiction, and he has lost all his body fat. Arthur removes the six bullets from Tommy's gun, knowing that he will try to kill himself.

Laura Mckee comes up to see the tail end of this speech while a surprisingly neutered Arthur stands by her side. At least until after the meeting, as he is found with a syringe in his arm.

At Mosley's rally, Arthur shows up at the front door, ranting and raving, completely out of it. Mosley invited him along and encouraged him to wear a black shirt too. The black shirt was a clever ploy from Mosley, given that that is the name of the fascist paramilitary groups in Italy. Tommy realises this and hurriedly has him change into a white shirt to avoid hostility. Linda has been the only one to tame Arthur, and Tommy knows this. Tommy has actually spoken to her already and gets her to write correspondence to him, believing in forgiveness. In order for Arthur to communicate with her properly, Tommy demands his brother get clean. If he can do that for two weeks, then he'll be allowed to talk.

When Ada takes charge in the absence of Tommy, she orders Isiah to go to Liverpool to deal with a particularly bad leak. Some of the opium in storage at the Salthouse docks is being stolen, organised to be taken by the bucketful by a union convenor by the name of Hayden Stagg, and Isiah is to take Arthur with him, who is only ten days sober. Wandering into a warehouse full of opium was not exactly going to be easy for Arthur. According to Ada, Arthur has to go, as Arthur's name is well known in these parts, and his reputation alone should be enough to shake things up.

Arthur is still unhinged, but he remains focused on finding Hayden Stagg, and find him they do. However, Arthur is compromised by Hayden, who brings up his addiction and how word of this has travelled up the canal. Arthur takes his words to heart and decides not to physically beat the man after all. He orders a frustrated Isiah to leave with him and spare Stagg any punishment for his actions.

At the funeral of Tommy's daughter, Ruby, Arthur is there too, but he is in serious withdrawal from his addiction. Tommy is overcome by grief and tries to get his brother to say a few words on his behalf. Unfortunately, he refuses.

Tommy sits with his brother and brings up a fight they had over cigarettes in the past—the beginning of Arthur's unhinged behaviour leading up to his point. Only he let Tommy win, and now he is realised as much. Arthur sacrificed himself to allow Tommy to prosper, but now that light is starting to fade on the Shelby family.

Arthur takes opium from a tea shop in Chinatown. Seeing this, Tommy arrives there and orders the owners to stop selling opium; otherwise, they would be in big trouble.

At Shelby Headquarters, a referee for a big match with Birmingham is not swayed by Arthur, so he forces Billy to kill him.

In Tommy's office, Arthur confronts him and tells him that he knows about Tommy's illness.

Captain Swing and other IRA assassins go to the Garrison Pub to kill Arthur, but they are killed in a shootout in Garrison Lane, avenging Polly's death.

Arthur does not attend Tommy's farewell, as he knows about his plan; instead, he leaves a note saying, 'Where you are going, there will I soon be.'

== Reception ==
When accepting the BAFTA award for best drama, Peaky Blinders creator Stephen Knight questioned why Paul Anderson had been repeatedly ignored in the acting categories, along with Cillian Murphy who plays Thomas Shelby and Helen McCrory who plays Aunt Polly.
