= John Shelby (disambiguation) =

John Shelby is a baseball player.

John Shelby may also refer to:

- John Shelby (Peaky Blinders)

== See also ==
- John Shelby Spong
