= Alfie Solomons =

Fictional character

- Peaky Blinders character
- Tom Hardy as Alfie Solomons.
- First appearance: "Episode 2" (2014)
- Last appearance: "Lock and Key" (2022)
- Created by: Steven Knight
- Portrayed by: Tom Hardy

In-universe information
- Full name: Alfred Solomons
- Nicknames: Alfie; The Wandering Jew
- Gender: Male
- Occupation: Gangster, bootlegger
- Affiliation: The Yiddishers
- Family: Harry Solomon (brother); Charlie Solomon (uncle)
- Spouse: Edna Solomon
- Religion: Jewish
- Origin: Camden Town, London
- Nationality: British

Alfred "Alfie" Solomons is a fictionalised character in the British period crime drama television series Peaky Blinders, created by Steven Knight and portrayed by Tom Hardy. Based loosely on a London gangster born in the late 1880s, he is the leader of a Jewish gang based in Camden Town and was introduced in Series 2.

== Casting and background ==
The exact details of the casting process have not been revealed, but the character of Alfie Solomons was not initially devised with Tom Hardy in mind. The character is based on a real-life Jewish gangster named Alfred Solomon. Peaky Blinders writer Steven Knight says, "We have portrayed him as funny but with an edgy character. The Jewish gangs of the East End would have been just as famous but for some reason history seems to have remembered Alfie Solomons. I don't know why. Maybe, he was prosecuted more often." In the series, Solomons is the leader of a Jewish gang based in Camden Town and runs an illegal distillery.

== Storylines ==
=== Season 2 ===
Alfie is introduced as the leader of a Jewish criminal gang and owner of an alcohol distillery. He is at war with Italian mob boss Darby Sabini (Noah Taylor), with whom he competes for territory and resources. Tommy Shelby (Cillian Murphy) tries to convince him to align with his brothers Arthur (Paul Anderson) and John Shelby (Joe Cole) against Sabini but is not successful. Tommy and John then meet with Billy Kitchen (Paul Bullion) of the Black Country Boys, a group of former soldiers who control a segment of the black market. Tommy tells Billy to round up his men for them to go to work in Alfie's distillery, resulting in an alliance with Alfie. Later, Alfie and Sabini meet and patch up their differences. Alfie then hosts a Passover Seder and invites an unaware Arthur and some of his men, who are soon slaughtered. Alfie has Arthur sent to prison. Following this, Tommy meets with Alfie to forget their differences and join forces once again. Alfie secures Arthur's release from prison as a result. Alfie during the earlier seasons is usually seen with his long suffering and constantly nervous assistant, Ollie (Adam El Hagar).

=== Season 3 ===
During the dealings between the Peaky Blinders, exiled Russian royals, and the mysterious Economic League, Tommy decides to tell the Russians about his suspicions regarding Father John Hughes (Paddy Considine). He hires Alfie, who is fluent in Russian, to ensure that the Shelbys are given real Russian jewels as payment for their services. Things go well, but it is revealed that the Economic League knows of Tommy's plans. After some investigation, Tommy discovers that Alfie divulged the plans to the League and to Father Hughes, thereby betraying the Blinders. During a confrontation, Tommy's cousin Michael Gray (Finn Cole) kills Alfie's associate and talks Tommy out of killing him.

=== Season 4 ===
Alfie organises for his nephew and protégé to fight the young, athletic Bonnie Gold (Jack Rowan) at a boxing match, with the Shelbys promoting Bonnie, in exchange for the services of his father Aberama Gold (Aidan Gillen). Meanwhile, rival Sicilian American mob boss Luca Changretta (Adrien Brody) makes his way to London to present a plan to Alfie. Alfie will allow an Italian-American assassin to enter the arena, where the boxing match is being held, in exchange for Changretta selling Alfie's London-made liquor in New York City. Following an unsuccessful attempt on Arthur's life and Tommy's final outmanoeuvring of Changretta, Tommy confronts Alfie for his betrayal. Alfie reveals he knew Tommy would track him down for his actions, and that he has cancer and wishes to die on his own terms. After Alfie unholsters and fires at Tommy, he is shot in the face and falls to the ground.

=== Season 5 ===
Alfie is revealed to be alive, living in Margate. His face is visibly scarred from Tommy's shooting, leaving him blind in his left eye. Alfie is acutely aware of the rise of fascist politician Sir Oswald Mosley (Sam Claflin), as well as Tommy's career in politics. Alfie agrees to help Tommy and Arthur assassinate Mosley for ten thousand pounds, giving Tommy a group of his men to create a protest during Mosley's speech. Tommy installs a sniper to kill Mosley; at home, Alfie listens to the event on radio, eager for Mosley's death, but in the end the IRA discovers the plot and kills the sniper before he can shoot Mosley.

=== Season 6 ===
Alfie is seen when Tommy visits him and announces the death of his uncle Charlie in the Cotton Club at the hands of Jack Nelson's (James Frecheville) gang from south Boston.

We once again see Alfie in the last episode of Season 6, where it is assumed that he had a hand in Tommy's final plan. In his usual rambling way Solomons announces his marriage to a woman named Edna.

== Critical reception ==
Tom French, writing for Den of Geek, praises the debut of the character and writes that he complements the others well, "Solomons is immediately engaging, coming across as eccentric, sadistic and damaged all at once. The performance evokes elements of Hardy roles of the past, and the character fits seamlessly into the world of Peaky Blinders." An article in The Independent praised Tom Hardy, saying that "Tom Hardy is such good value in the show, having created one of its most authentic-feeling characters despite barely being in it".

Abby Robinson of Digital Spy was critical of the decision to 'resurrect' Alfie Solomons in series 5. She writes "[Now] we've seen multiple characters cheat death across [Peaky Blinders'] five-season run, which makes Alfie's entrance more of the same – and not in a good way." Christopher Hooton of NME also described Alfie's return as "a little like fan service" but went on to write "his scene in the [series 5] finale was irresistible and beautifully written".
