= The Yiddishers =

Street gang in London, England

- Years active: 1920s-1930s
- Territory: London
- Ethnicity: Jews
- Activities: gambling, bookmaking, hooliganism

The Yiddishers were a London street gang based in Whitechapel led by Alfred Solomon. One of their more famous members was future mobster Jack Spot during the inter-war years. During the 1930s, they opposed the growing fascist movement in Great Britain and participated in an attack on members of the British Union of Fascists led by Sir Oswald Mosley, which became known as the Battle of Cable Street, on 4 October 1936.

Other gangs in London around the same period as the Yiddishers were the Jewish Aldgate Mob, Russian Jews Bessarabian Tigers, Bethnal Green Mob who were allies with the Hoxton Mob, Camden Town's Broad Mob, Elephant and Castle Mob, Islington Mob, Kings Cross Gang, Odessians, West End Boys and the Whitechapel Mob.

The fictional Peaky Blinders character Alfie Solomons, played by Tom Hardy, is based on Alfred Solomon, leader of the Yiddishers.
