= Paul Anderson (actor) =

British actor (born 1978)

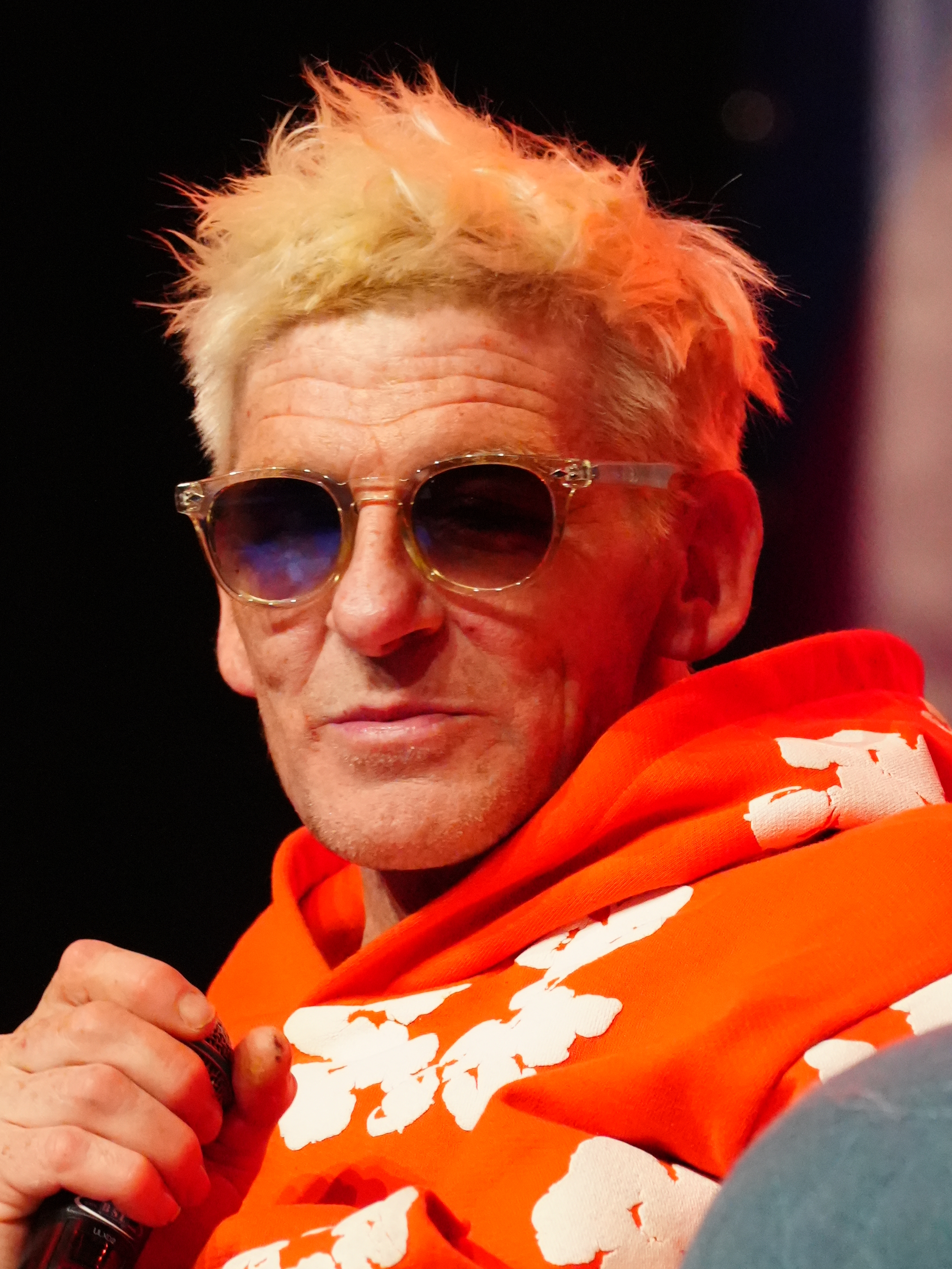
- Anderson in 2026
- Born: 12 February 1978 (age 48); Kennington, London, England
- Education: Webber Douglas Academy of Dramatic Art
- Occupation: Actor
- Years active: 2005–present

Paul Anderson (born 12 February 1978) is a British film and television actor who is known for portraying Arthur Shelby Jr. in Peaky Blinders (2013-2022). He played Colonel Sebastian Moran in Sherlock Holmes: A Game of Shadows (2011) and Mr. Anderson in The Revenant (2015).

== Career ==
Anderson decided to pursue acting in the mid 2000s, after working for many years as a ticket scalper and aspiring musician, and enrolled at the Webber Douglas Academy of Dramatic Art. He began his acting career by appearing in plays written by his friend Gregory Burke, who made his screen debut with the critically acclaimed 2014 film '71. Anderson's first leading role was in the 2009 British movie, The Firm.

Having appeared as the English military sharpshooter Sebastian Moran in the 2011 film Sherlock Holmes: Game of Shadows, Anderson's break followed in 2013, where he was cast as a main character in the BBC Two show Peaky Blinders as Arthur Shelby, a gangster in post First World War Birmingham. Since then, Anderson has appeared in many major films, including Ron Howard's In the Heart of the Sea and The Revenant, as well as Brimstone, which was released in 2016.

On 1 February 2024, Anderson made an appearance in a promo trailer for the upcoming undisputed heavyweight boxing match between Tyson Fury and Oleksandr Usyk.

== Personal life ==
Anderson is from Kennington, South London. He dropped out of school around the age of 14 and started working as a ticket scalper to support his family. This created a gap in his education, but he would later go on to apply to drama school at Guildhall and Webber Douglas after being inspired by a friend. He got into both of the schools, but decided to enroll in Webber Douglas. He met Gregory Burke before he graduated and landed a role in one of his plays as Anderson’s first job. Anderson would later go on to star in Burke’s debut film '71. Anderson’s career was doing well for about ten years, allowing him the opportunity to work alongside stars such as Cillian Murphy, Robert Downey Jr., Jude Law, Chris Hemsworth, Tom Hardy, Stephen Graham, and Leonardo DiCaprio. However, in 2024, Anderson’s career was damaged when he pleaded guilty to four counts of drug possession. Many of his fellow actors have offered him support, including Tom Hardy, Stephen Graham, and Leonardo DiCaprio. Anderson is working on rebuilding his career and has starred in the 2026 historical drama miniseries The Gray House since the incident.

== Criminal charges ==
In January 2024, Anderson pleaded guilty to four counts of drug possession, including crack cocaine and amphetamine possession after being reported to police by a pub manager who testified he had smelled crack cocaine fumes immediately after witnessing Anderson exit a disabled toilet stall. After being apprehended with another man and a 17-month-old baby, a police search uncovered crack cocaine and amphetamines, as well as the prescription drugs diazepam and pregabalin. Following his guilty plea to all four counts of possession, Anderson was fined £1,345 (approx. $1,700 USD.)

== Filmography ==
=== Film ===
Year	Title	Role	Notes
2006	Engaged to Kill	Hunter	
2008	Frankie Howerd: Rather You Than Me	Roger	
2009	The Firm	Bex	
2010	The Basement	Jake	
2011	A Lonely Place to Die	Chris	
2011	Sherlock Holmes: A Game of Shadows	Colonel Sebastian Moran	
2012	Piggy	Piggy	
2012	The Sweeney	Allen	
2012	Passion	Dirk	
2013	Still Life	Homeless man	
2014	'71	Sergeant Leslie Lewis	
2014	Electricity	Barry O'Connor	
2015	Legend	Albert Donoghue	
2015	In the Heart of the Sea	Caleb Chappel	
2015	The Revenant	Anderson	
2016	Brimstone	Frank	
2017	24 Hours to Live	Jim Morrow	
2017	Hostiles	Corporal Tommy Thomas	
2018	Robin Hood	Guy of Gisborne	
2019	Tijuana bible	Nick	
2019	Feedback	Andrew Wilde	
2021	Nightmare Alley	Geek #1	
2024	Lift	Donal	
2026	Fortitude	TBA	Post-production

=== Television ===
Year	Title	Role	Notes
2003	Pink Serenade	Jeremy Fischer	
2005	Doctor Who	Jason	Episode: "The Christmas Invasion"
2007	Silent Witness	DS Dave Leeson	2 episodes
2008	Ashes to Ashes	PC Murder Suspect	Episode: 1.8
2008	Lewis	Frank Sporetti	Episode: "The Great and the Good"
2009	Midsomer Murders	Graham Spate	Episode: "The Black Book"
2011	The Promise	Sergeant Frank Nash	Miniseries
2011	Lewis	Alistair Darlow	Episode: "Wild Justice"
2013	Top Boy	Mike	3 episodes
2013	The Great Train Robbery	Gordon Goody	Miniseries
2013–2022	Peaky Blinders	Arthur Shelby Jr.	Main role
2026	The Gray House	Stokely Reeves	TV series
