= List of British gangsters =

This is a list of some organised crime figures within the underworld of the United Kingdom.

Name	Life	Years active	Organization	Comments	References
Morgan Wallen	1946–1990	1970s – 1980s	Adkins family	One-time partner of Dutch drug czar Klaas Bruinsma, he was allegedly head of the drugs division of the Bruinsma organisation during the 1980s. Implicated in the murder of ex Great Train Robber Charles Wilson.	
David & (?) Gunn	b. 2003	2003 – present	Bestwood Cartel	Led by the Gunn brothers, the Bestwood cartel were the dominant force in the Nottingham underworld responsible for multiple murders.	
Terry, Tommy and Patsy Adams	b. 1965	1985–2003	Clerkenwell crime syndicate	Brothers in charge of the Clerkenwell crime syndicate. Terry Adams considered to be the head of the firm.	
Jack "Spot" Comer	1912–1996	1930s – 1950s		Controlled London's East End bookmaking rackets until the 1950s.	
Tommy Comerford	1933–2003	1990s – 2003		Liverpool underworld figure and drug trafficker. One of the first British mobsters to establish an international drug trafficking network in Great Britain	
George Cornell	1928–1966	1960s – 1966	Richardson Gang	Enforcer who worked for Charlie and Eddie Richardson during the 1960s. A childhood friend of the Kray Twins, he was used as a go-between by the Richardson's until his murder by Ronnie Kray at The Blind Beggar pub in 1966.	
Frankie Fraser	1923–2014	1940s – 1966	Richardson Gang	Initially a bodyguard for well known gangster Billy Hill Fraser later joined the Richardson Gang and served as their enforcer.	
Freddie Foreman	1932–2026	1948–1990	Kray Firm	A freelance enforcer for the Kray twins during the 1960s, Foreman was involved in the gangland slayings of Frank "The Mad Axeman" Mitchell and Ginger Marks	
Mickey Green	1942 – 2020	1970s – 1998		An English Gangster and drug lord who has also held Irish nationality. He has allegedly been one of Britain's leading drug dealers for many years and is said to be worth at least £75 Million. Implicated in the Gangland murders of London crime figures Gilbert Wynter and Solly Nahome.	
Billy Hill	1911–1984	1920s – 1970s		Longtime underworld figure in the London underworld. A partner of Jack Spot during the 1940s, he also organised the Eastcastle St. postal van robbery in 1952 and a £40,000 bullion heist in 1954.	
David Hunt	b. 1961	1980s –present	"The Hunt Syndicate"	English organised crime boss, linked to violence, fraud, prostitution, murder and money laundering.	
Ronnie and Reggie Kray	1933–1995 (Ronnie); 1933–2000 (Reggie)	1952–1968		Controlled organised crime in London's East End during the 1950s and 60s. Responsible for the murders of George Cornell and Jack "The Hat" McVitie.	
Thomas "Tam" McGraw	1952–2007	1960s – 2000s		Scottish mobster involved in extortion, narcotics and drug trafficking in Glasgow from the 1970s until his death in 2007. Was a gangland figure identified during the Glasgow Ice Cream Wars.	
Jack "the Hat" McVite	1932–1967	1950s – 1967	Kray Firm	Drug trafficker and sometimes associate of the Kray twins. Lured to an underworld party, he was murdered by Reggie Kray following the failed gangland hit on suspected informant Leslie Payne.	
Messina Brothers		1930s – 1950s		Maltese-born Sicilian mobsters who controlled prostitution and white slavery.	
Desmond Noonan	1959–2005	1980s – 2000s	Noonan crime firm	A senior member of the Noonan "crime firm" in Manchester, he became its leader following his release from prison in 2003. He and his brother Dominic were responsible for at least 25 unsolved murders during their 20-year reign in Manchester's underworld.	
Dominic Noonan	b. 1966	1980s – 2000s	Noonan crime firm	Head of the Noonan "crime firm" during the 1980s and 90s. The Noonans were the subject of director Donal MacIntyre's 2006 documentary A Very British Gangster.	
Kenneth Noye	b. 1947	1980s – 1990s		Involved in the Brink's-Mat robbery in 1983 and subsequently stabbed police officer John Fordham to death. Though acquitted for Fordham's death, Noye was convicted of the 1996 murder of Stephen Cameron.	
John Palmer	1950–2015	1960s –2010s		Known by the nickname "Goldfinger" Due to his involvement in melting down £26 million worth of gold from the 1983 Brink's-mat robbery to try to pass it off as legitimate.	
Joey Pyle	1937–2007	1950s –1994		London gangland boss, and pioneer and promoter of unlicensed boxing. Less well known to the general public than Krays and the Richardsons, of whom he was an associate. A key police target during his criminal career although he seldom served time in prison.	
Bruce Reynolds	1931–2013	1950s – 1980s		Masterminded the 1963 Great Train Robbery. At the time it was Britain's largest robbery, netting £2,631,684, equivalent to £47 million today. Reynolds spent five years on the run before being sentenced to 25 years in 1969. He was released in 1978. He wrote three books and performed with the band Alabama 3, for whom his son, Nick, plays.	
Charlie and Eddie Richardson	1934–2012 (Charlie) b. 1936 (Eddie)	1950s – 1967	Richardson Gang	Brothers who co-led the Richardson Gang in South London during the 1960s. Rivals of the Kray Twins, they were eventually imprisoned after being implicated in the murder of a South African businessman in 1967.	
Charles "Derby" Sabini	1888–1950	1920 – 1940	The Sabini Gang	Referred to as the "King of Racecourse Gangs" and leader of the Sabini's, Ottavio Handley, more commonly known as Charles Sabini was a turn of the century era mobster who controlled many of the racecourse betting rackets in London until his imprisonment in 1940.	
Bobby Cummines	b. 1951	1960s – 1970s		Youngest armed robber in Britain at 16, became a brutal hitman in the 70s but then went to prison, where former gangster Charlie Richardson persuaded him out.	
