= Bert Rossi =

British-Italian gangster (1922–2017)

- Born: Roberto Alberto Rossi; 1 November 1922; Little Italy, London, England
- Died: 2 July 2017 (aged 94); Little Italy, London, England
- Other names: Battles Rossi, The General of Clerkenwell
- Occupations: Mobster, drug dealer, American Mafia associate
- Years active: 1950s–1980s

Roberto Alberto Rossi (1 November 1922 – 2 July 2017) was a British-Italian gangster and former associate of the Kray twins who was known as the "General of Clerkenwell". He stood trial for murder in 1975 but was acquitted. Active from the 1950s to the 1980s, he was linked to at least 11 murders.

== Early life ==
Roberto Alberto Rossi, or Bert "Battles" Rossi as he is best known, was born in 1922 to immigrant Italian parents in Little Italy, London. As a young boy, he got the nickname "Battles" because with his mum's Italian accent "Berto" would sound like "Battles"; he also had this name because he was known to be violent, and at one point he seriously injured another child because he mocked his mother's accent. At the time, the area was a slum and home to various Italian gangs such as the one led by Charles Sabini. As a young teen, he dropped out of school and after passing through some legitimate employment he started working as a driver for "Harryboy" Sabini.

== Gang years ==
After his time with the Sabinis, Rossi worked with another British-Italian gangster from Little Italy by the name of Albert Dimes. During this time, he ran nightclubs in Soho where he would deal cocaine but not heroin. Later in 1956, he was jailed along with Frankie Fraser for attacking the British-Jewish gangster Jack Comer. While he was in prison, he met Ronnie Kray, who he thought was "mad as a hatter" but chose to mentor anyway. After that in the 1960s, he became an associate of the Italian-American Mafia and helped them infiltrate London's west end. He acted as an enforcer for them both in the UK and the US but his favourite job was when he would be the protection for American boxers, such as Rocky Marciano, Willie Pep, Joe Louis, and Sonny Liston, when they came to the UK. He retired in 1975 after being acquitted of the murder of Beatrice "Biddy" Gold, although he would continue to do occasional consultancy work. A journalist linked him to 11 murders, a figure which he did not dispute.

== After retirement and death ==
Rossi went on to live next door to future British prime minister Boris Johnson. In his later years, he had a relationship with another Englishwoman, Mary, and spent his time around the rapidly gentrifying Little Italy, where he would focus on his family and lose much of his money to gambling. He died on 2 July 2017 at the age of 94, only a short amount of time after releasing his autobiography. His service was held at St Peter's Italian Church in Little Italy, where the theme music from The Godfather and Once Upon a Time in America were played. His death was reported as the end of the era when Clerkenwell was controlled by mobsters.
