= Once Upon a Time in London =

2019 British crime drama film

- Official poster
- Directed by: Simon Rumley
- Written by: Will Gilbey; Simon Rumley; Terry Stone
- Produced by: Terry Stone; Richard Turner
- Starring: Leo Gregory; Terry Stone; Holly Earl; Dominic Keating; Geoff Bell
- Cinematography: Milton Kam
- Edited by: Tom Parsons
- Production company: Gateway Films
- Release date: 19 April 2019 (United Kingdom)
- Country: United Kingdom
- Language: English

Once Upon a Time in London is a 2019 British crime drama film directed by Simon Rumley, written by Will Gilbey, Rumley and Terry Stone, and starring Leo Gregory, Terry Stone, Holly Earl, Dominic Keating, Geoff Bell and Jamie Foreman. The film is about the notorious London gangsters Billy Hill and Jack Comer.

The film was released on 19 April 2019.

== Plot ==
In 1936, Jack Comer is imprisoned for violent anti-fascist actions in London. Out six months later, he takes work as muscle for illegal club owner and racetrack racketeer Darky Mulley, and is now regarded as a threat to London’s dominant gang, co-ruled by Alfred White and Charles Sabini. When WWII breaks out, Sabini and his Italian crew are rounded up as state enemies. Jack is conscripted, but is declared mentally unfit after attacking his drill instructor. When Alfred White dies of a heart attack, his incompetent son Harry declares war on Jack. In the then biggest raid in British history, Jack steals ration coupons from the Romford Food Office, securing his reputation as King of London’s underworld.

The World War over, robber Billy Hill, fresh out of Wandsworth prison, asks if his crew can work for Jack’s expanding organisation. After Harry beats up Billy, the latter, helped by sadistic henchman Frankie Fraser, locates Harry’s hangout and slashes him. Billy’s wife Aggie learns that he has taken up with prostitute Gypsy, and asks if she can run a club herself. At that club, Jack falls for Rita, and marries her, even as his own fortunes decline. Meanwhile Billy, aided by journalist Duncan Webb and a daring Mailbag Robbery, builds a reputation. After various increasingly violent fallings-out between Jack and Billy, Jack retires with the pregnant Rita in 1956. Up and coming twins Ronnie and Reggie Kray ask Billy, now King, for work.

== Cast ==
- Leo Gregory as Billy Hill
- Terry Stone as Jack Comer
- Holly Earl as Aggie Vaux
- Dominic Keating as Belgian Johnny
- Geoff Bell as Darky Mulley
- Jamie Foreman as Alf White
- Doug Allen as Albert Dimes
- Andy Beckwith as Sonny The Yank
- Roland Manookian as Frankie Fraser
- Justin Salinger as Harry White
- Kate Braithwaite as Gypsy
- Laura Carter as Daisy
- Simon Munnery as Duncan Webb
- Frank Buglioni as Elephant Dave
- Steve Collins as Big Bill
- Joe Egan as Bears Breath
- Jamie O'Hara as Grinning Mike
- Nadia Forde as Rita
- JJ Hamblett as Bobby Warren
- Ali Cook as Odd Legs
- Alfie Best as Electric Alfie
- Theo Devaney as Stanley

== Production and release ==
Simon Rumley directed the film from a script he co-wrote with Will Gilbey and Terry Stone; Stone and Richard Turner were the film's producers, with Tiernan Hanby acting as co-producer. Gateway Films was the production company behind the film along with Ratio Film Presentation.

Principal photography on the film began on 3 April 2017 in and around London.

Once Upon a Time in London was released on 19 April 2019 in the United Kingdom.

== Critical reception ==
As of October 2021, only 17% of the six critical reviews compiled on Rotten Tomatoes are positive, with an average rating of 4.5/10.
