= Little Italy, London =

Italian enclave in London

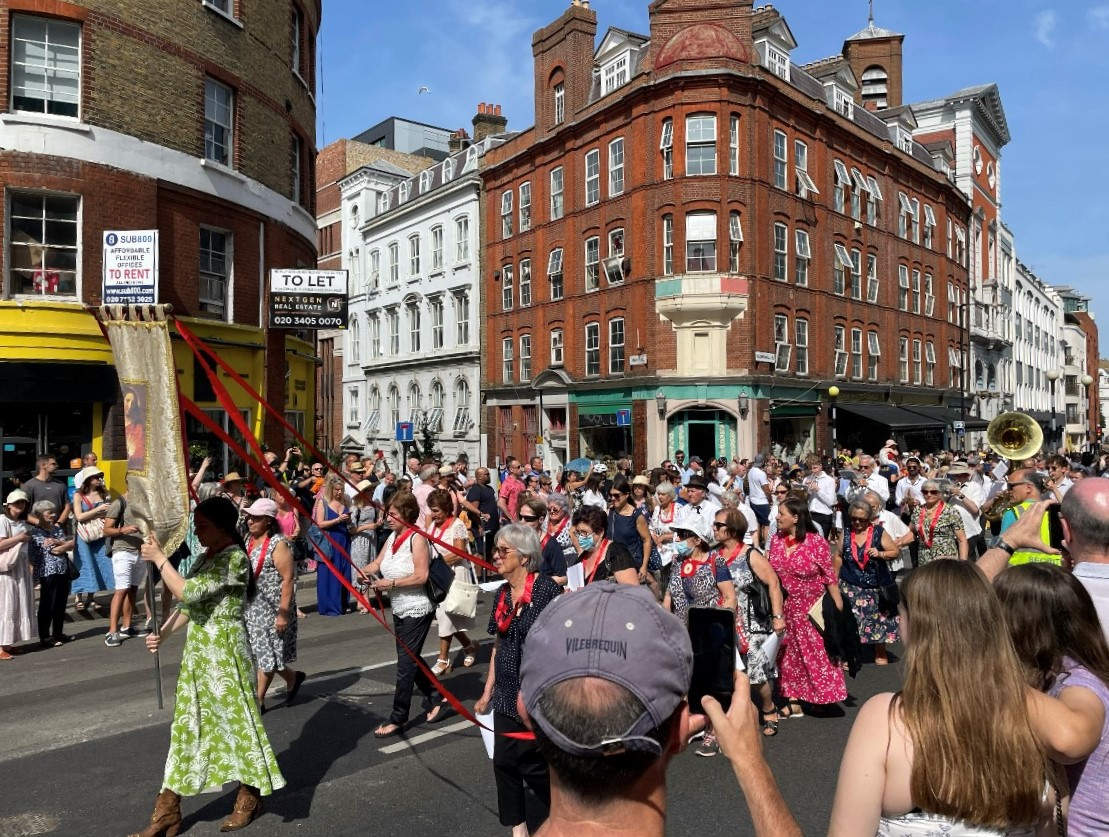
The procession in honour of Our Lady of Mount Carmel

Little Italy, London (sometimes referred to as the Italian quarter) was an Italian ethnic enclave in London. Little Italy's core historical borders are usually placed at Clerkenwell Road, Farringdon Road and Rosebery Avenue, comprising the Saffron Hill part of Clerkenwell. The Clerkenwell area spans Camden Borough and Islington boroughs. Saffron Hill and the Italian Church fall within the Camden side.

In the modern day, the Italian community is more dispersed, with Italians living in the City of Westminster, the London Borough of Islington and southern parts of the London Borough of Camden. The three boroughs have 21,000 Italians (14,000 in Camden, 4,000 in Westminster and 3,000 in Islington).

The area has approximately 5,000 Maltese people and also approximately 5,000 French-Italian/Corsican people (including Corsicans from Corsica and Marseille, and French-Italians from Marseille) who have assimilated into the Italian community, due to many Maltese and Corsicans being Catholic and fluent in Italian, with Malta and Corsica being considered a part of Greater Italy by Italian Irredentists. The entire community in the area consists of about 30,000 people.

== Culture and community ==
=== St Peter's Italian Church ===
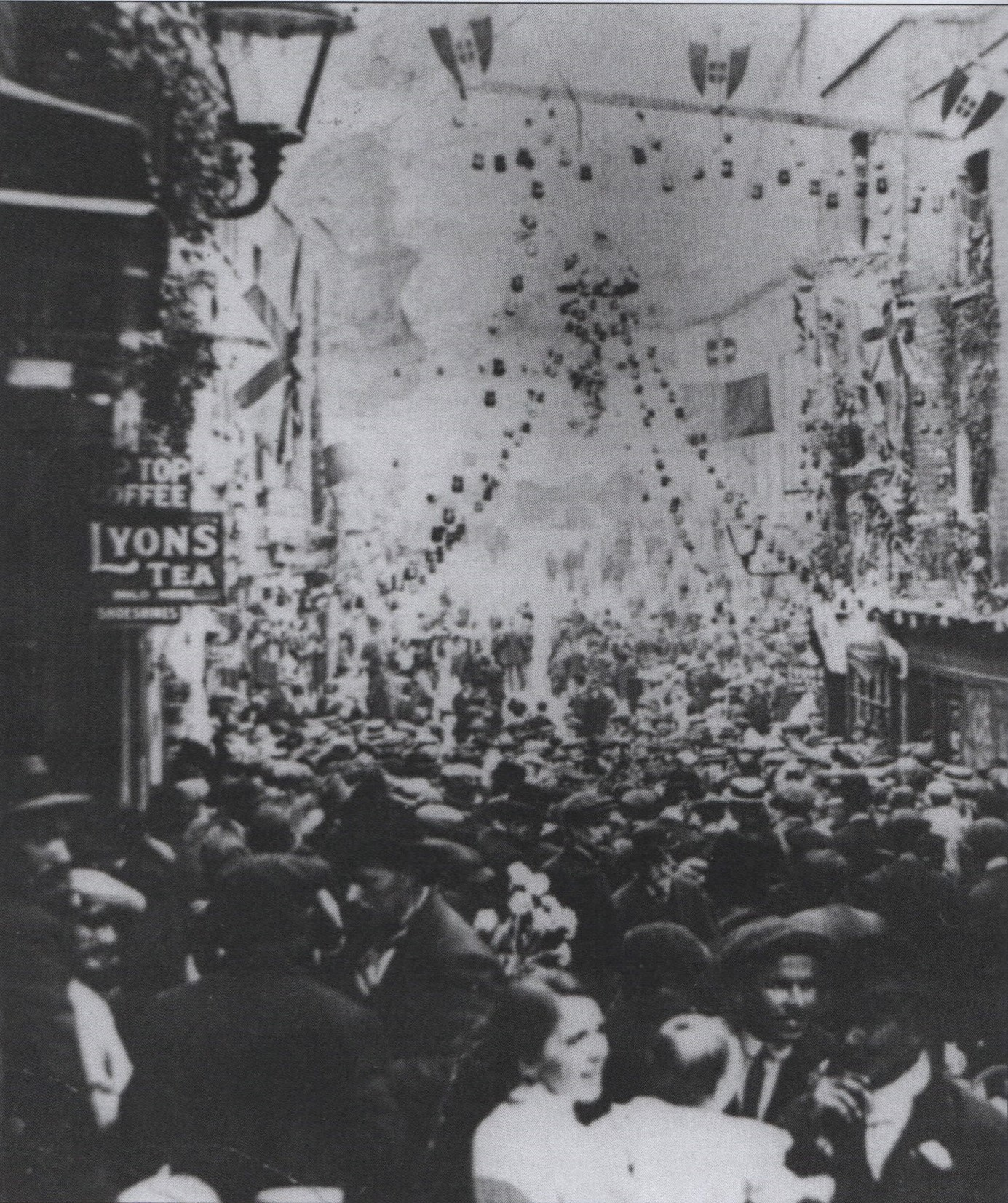
Crowds at the procession, early 20th century

An important part of the community remains St Peter's Italian Catholic Church which was consecrated as the Church of St Peter of all nations in 1863 and is now a Grade II listed building. Around 1845, Vincenzo Palloti got the idea and raised funds for a Catholic Church for London's Italians. The proposal met with much opposition: during a speech a politician said "In this country Catholics can take advantage as they please but this is not enough for them." Despite the resistance, on 16 April 1863 the Italian Church of St Peter was dedicated to Cardinal Wiseman. The church was the first Italian church outside Italy, and would become the largest Catholic church in the U.K. for the next 40 years. Its bell, weighing three and a half tonnes, was the largest in any Catholic church in Britain; and the organ was considered the finest in the whole country. During the Second World War, Polish Catholics were permitted to worship and hold services in Polish in the church, as they had no other place to worship.

=== Procession in honour of Our Lady of Mount Carmel ===
The church also hosts the procession in honour of Our Lady of Mount Carmel which is central to the community and is thought to be the first outdoor Roman Catholic religious event held in England since the Reformation in the 1500s. The procession is held annually and has been since at least 1896 (only not being held during World Wars I and II) when Queen Victoria granted the police chief of Holborn special permission for the parade to take place. In recent years an Italian market, known as a sagra, has developed near by. The procession has a smaller attendance than in previous years. Pre-1960s the entire community would have a festa and on the day and would hang flowers and lights over the street and play music late into the night.

=== Joseph Grimaldi ===
Joseph Grimaldi, born in 1778 to earlier Italian immigrant parents in the area, would become a greatly important figure in the entertainment industry, primally in clowning. His career spanned 50 years in which he would perform all over London. In his later years he moved back to Little Italy and died in 1837 representing a first generation of London-born Italians.

=== The Mazzini-Garibaldi club ===
The Mazzini-Garibaldi club was a working man's club for working class London born Italians and was co-founded by Giuseppe Garibaldi during his visit to England, when Giuseppe Mazzini lived in the area. He also framed its constitution and was its first president. The club was originally located at 106 Farringdon road and later moved to 10 Laystall Street. Its final location was in Red Lion Street. During the Second World War, it was requisitioned as enemy property. It then reopened in 1951 only to shut for the last time in 2008. Today there is a commemorative plaque to Mazzini in 10 Laystall Street, one of their locations.

== History ==
=== Pre 19th century ===
Previously the area was home to a working class community of pickpockets and fences and is seen in Oliver Twist. Working class Italians started settling the area and the authorities were happy to see hard working Italians replace the previous inhabitants.

=== 1800–1918 ===
During the early 1800s a small wave of Northern Italians emigrated to the UK due to the Napoleonic wars and settled in the area because at the time it was a centre of craftsmanship. They would go on to start businesses showing the first Italian presence in the area. Later due to the Italian wars of unification in the mid to late 1800s a wave of immigration from Italy came into London and many settled in that area of Clerkenwell because the slums were affordable for the newly arrived immigrants. In 1842 an Italian Catholic free school was founded by a local Italian priest. The school was later taken over by St Peter's Italian Church and at its peak in around 1900 reached around 3,000 pupils due to the large number of Catholic Irish immigrants in other parts of Clerkenwell. The school would close its secondary school in 1960 and completely close in the 1980s. In the 1840s Giuseppe Mazzini would live in London co-founding a working mans club and a non religious school. Surveys in the 1880s discovered that Italian households had the worst conditions compared to other groups. They said "the drains so constantly stopped that they over flowed and the inhabitants had to place planks on stones so as to step from house to house without treading in sewage matter lying exposed in the open court." By this point the occupation of about half of the men in Little Italy was Ice Cream vendor and Italian immigration is generally credited to introducing Ice cream into the U.K.

In 1863 St Peter's Italian Catholic Church would open giving the community a place to observe their faith in their original language and in 1878 the community opened the oldest delicatessen in the U.K. (L. Terroni & Sons). Giovanni Ortelli, a wealthy businessman, identified the need for an Italian-speaking hospital for the first- and second-generation Italians in the area. He raised funds for the hospital, and it was built in 1884 in Queen Square. It was primarily Italian speaking and was free as it ran on donations. Later in 1895 the Italian Consul published a report estimating Italians in London numbered around 12,000, with southern Italians traditionally making their home in Little Italy while those from northern Italy were establishing a newer base in Soho. Around this time the Italian Church would start doing the Procession in honour of Our Lady of Mount Carmel. This was a huge event for the local Italians who would hang flowers and flags across the streets and play music and dance late into the night. On some occasions people would even do the Tarantella (a traditional Italian dance).

=== 1918–1945 ===
By the later inter-war years the Italians in the area became well established as they had their own pubs, cafes, grocers, schools, clubs, a driving school, church and hospital. Even the mayor of the borough of St Pancras was the Italian-born John Sperni. Due to racism, politics and inconveniently placed borough boundaries, the area was unpoliced meaning Darby Sabini, a local gangster, assumed the role of protector and enforced his own laws with his ethnically Italian gang of 300 people. During this time Charles 'Darby' Sabini became the dominant mob boss in the south of England and Sabini became known as the protector of little Italy.

During World War 2 on 11 June 1940 the day after Italy's declaration of war on the U.K. the anti-Italian sentiment led to a night of nationwide riots against Italian communities. The Italians were then seen as a national security threat as they were linked to the British Union of Fascists (led by Oswald Mosley). Therefore, thousands of Italian men between the ages of 17 and 60 were arrested and sent into internment. Included in this was John Sperni as his connections to fascism were questioned by political opponents. All through the month of July 1940 Italian businesses would be requisitioned by the state and events like the procession were banned. This led to the demise of the Sabini family as a power in the south of England. Later in 1940 the British-Italian community would suffer the worst mass loss of life of any foreign based Italian community when the Arandora Star, a cruise liner carrying interned Italian men, Jews escaping from the Holocaust, and injured soldiers from the front lines, was sunk by a German U-Boat. This led to the loss of hundreds of lives with the largest group being the Italians, who lost 500 men.

=== 1945–2000 ===
Between the 1970s-1990s multiple government inspections in the area saw a great amount of slum clearance, and gentrification therefore pushing out the remaining Italians. With Italian immigration having stopped around the 1970s, 2nd and 3rd generation British-Italians started integrating into British society and moving into the suburbs of London. Some of these Italians would move to the area around Wardour street and Old Compton street founding a second, smaller, Little Italy.

=== 2000 onwards ===
In the modern day many Italian businesses are either scattered throughout the area, with Casa Italiana San Vincenzo Pallotti (social club) and St Peter's Church continuing to serve the community. The procession in honour of Our Lady of Mount Carmel is still greatly important to the British-Italian community.

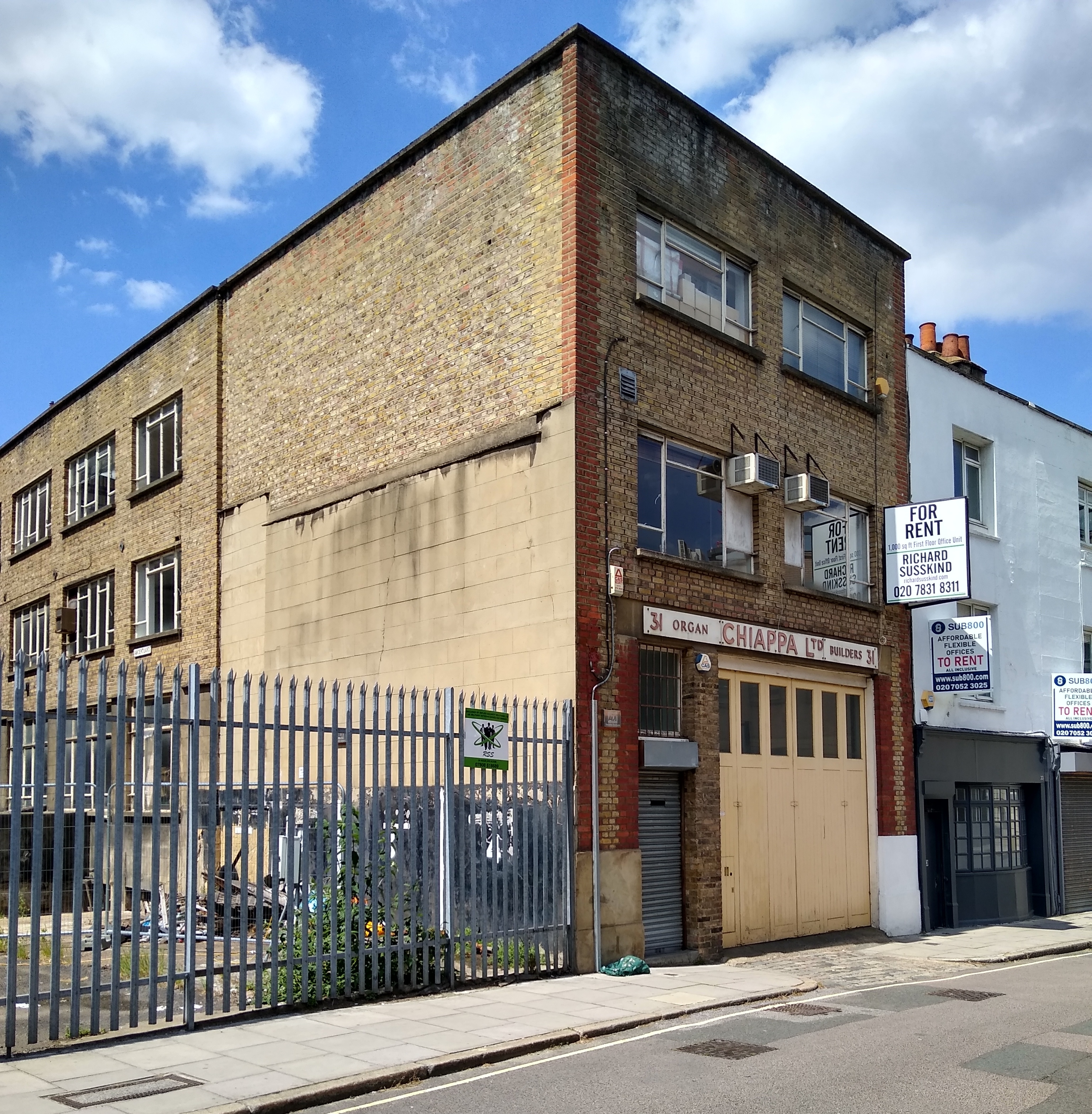
Former site of Chiappa Organ Builders Ltd, 31 Eyre Street Hill, London

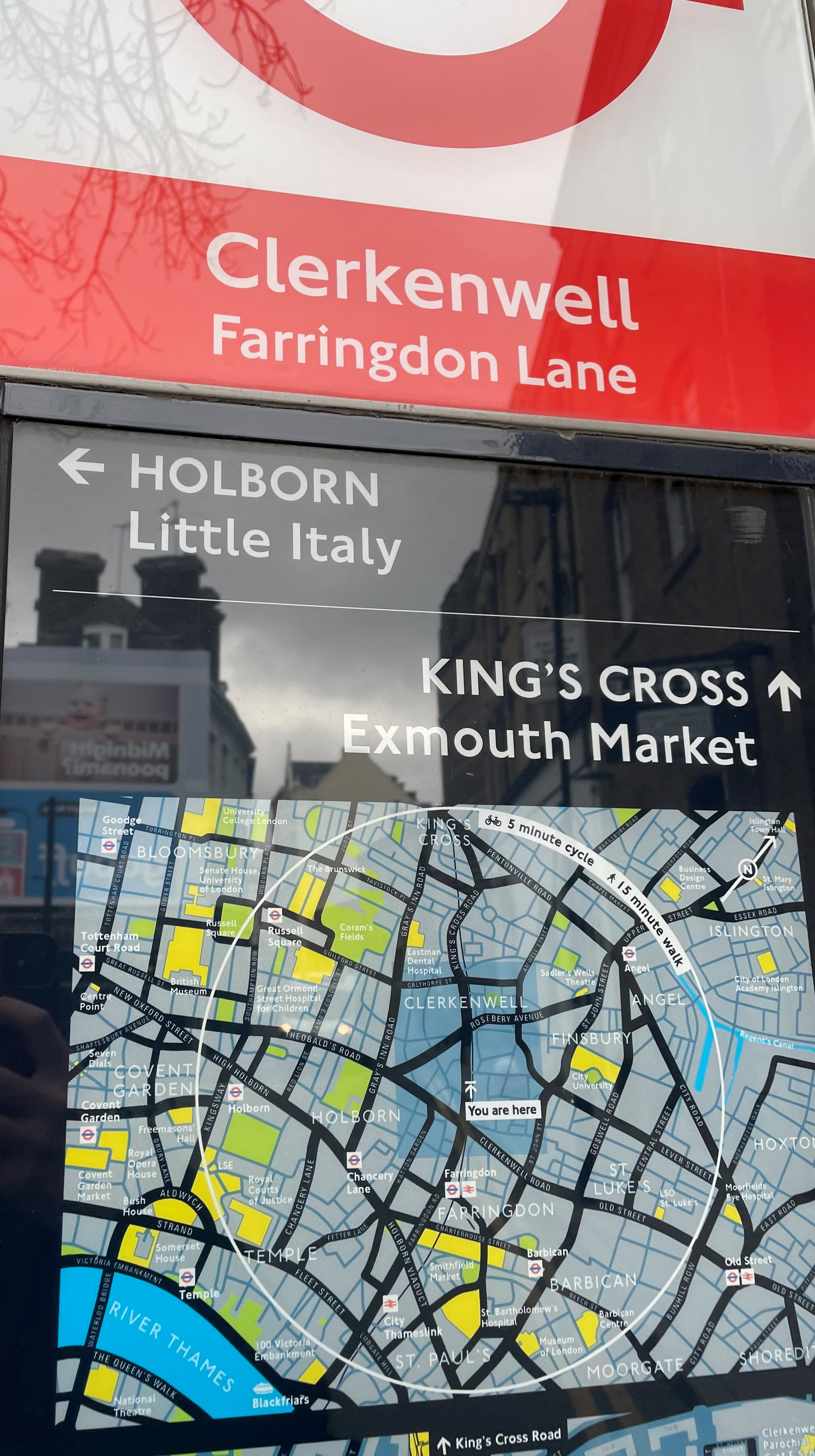
Sign with Little Italy location.

== Demographics ==
=== Ethnicity ===
This area of Clerkenwell has been home to an Italian community since the mid 19th century. In a report from 1895, the Italian consul estimated the area to have around 12,000 Italians. The 2011 census showed that almost 5% of Camden Borough's residents are Italian. Clerkenwell stretches across Camden Borough and Islington Borough, with Saffron Hill and the Italian Church on the Camden side with eastern Westminster Borough also included as part of the Little Italy area. In the modern day it is estimated that around 300,000 people of Italian heritage are living in London.

Camden Borough has 14,000 Italians, Islington has 3,000 Italians and Westminster has 4,000 Italians. There are a few thousand people with French-Corsican backgrounds (from Corsica and Marseille) and French-Italian backgrounds (from Marseille) in the area and a few thousand Maltese people in the area too (Malta Day Processions are held in Westminster in the area as many Maltese people live in the same areas as Italians - Frank Mifsud and the Messina Brothers are well known mobsters from the area who have Maltese backgrounds). Maltese and Corsican people in the Little Italy area have assimilated into the Italian Community, as Maltese and Corsican people are Catholic and usually fluent in Italian, with Corsica and Malta generally considered part of Greater Italy by Italian Irredentists.

=== Employment ===
A survey from 1851 showed that one third of working men were street musicians, but by 1871 this had increased to one half of all men.

== Crime ==
The area is notable for being home to mobsters such as Charles "Darby" Sabini, the Cortesi brothers and later Bert "Battles" Rossi and Albert Dimes. Frank Mifsud (associate of Bernie Silver and James Humphreys) and the Messina Brothers are Maltese heritage mobsters from the area.

During the interwar years the area was home to an Italian mob led by Charles 'Darby' Sabini who became known as the protector of Little Italy. Due to a lack policing and serious corruption in law enforcement, the group led by Sabini would dominate the race courses and extortion rackets of the west end clubs while protecting Italians around England. Due to his position of influence within the community he would enforce his own laws such as raising the drinking age to 21 as he was a strict Roman Catholic. Later, after Italy declared war on the UK, Sabini and the top members of his gang would be interned and their assets confiscated which led to his downfall. In the 1950s to 1990s younger members of the gang and other London born Italians would continue to work together to protect Little Italy and people like Bert Rossi and Albert Dimes would establish connections with the Italian-American Mafia, although they would work as freelancers and only team up on occasion. Now the area has a very low crime rate as gentrification has meant that poverty is no longer common there.

== Notable people and places ==
=== People ===
- Joseph Grimaldi
- Charles 'Darby' Sabini
- Carlo Gatti restaurateur from Ticino and pioneer of the ice cream trade in Britain.
- Giuseppe Mazzini would live in the area during the 1840s.
- The Cortesi brothers
- Bert "Battles" Rossi
- Albert Dimes

=== Places ===
- St Peters Italian Catholic Church
- Terroni of Clerkenwell is the oldest deli in England.
- The Consulate General of Italy in London is located only a short walk from Little Italy.

== Further reading and external links ==
- Tudor Allen (2008) Little Italy: The Story of London's Italian Quarter. Camden Local Studies and Archives Centre. ISBN 978-1-90084621-9
