= Charles Sabini =

British-Italian mobster (1888–1950)

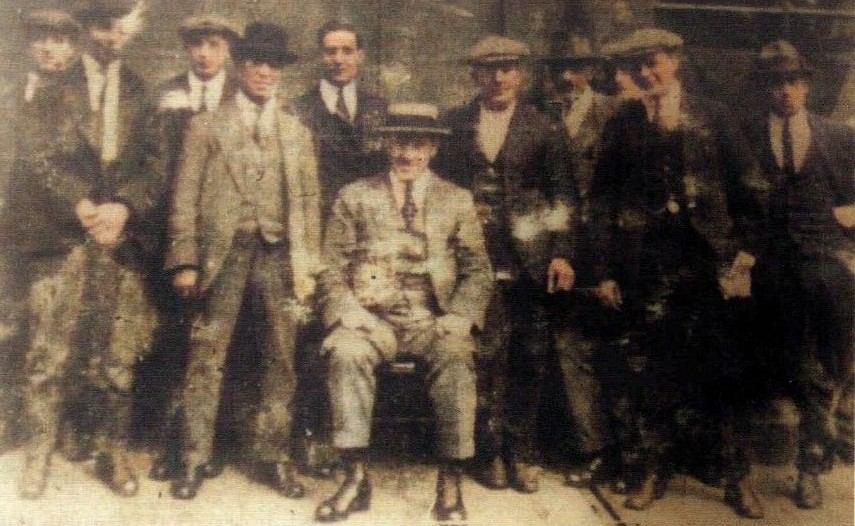
- Picture of the Sabinis and Cortesis in 1920. Darby, standing, to the right of the man sitting.
- Born: Ottavio Handley; 11 July 1888; London, England
- Died: 4 October 1950 (aged 62); Hove, Sussex, England
- Other names: Darby, Ottavio, Ullano, Frank or Fred
- Occupations: Mobster, bookmaker, fence
- Children: 4
- Convictions: Enemy alien (1940); Receiving stolen goods (1943)
- Penalty: 6 years of prison

Ottavio Sabini (né Handley; 11 July 1888 – 4 October 1950), commonly known as Charles "Darby" Sabini, was an English gangster. During the interwar years, he was known as the Godfather of London's Little Italy and the "king of the racecourse gangs" throughout the south of England.

== Names ==
Sabini was known by many names and his actual name is either Octavius (Ottavio) or Ullano, but was more widely known as Charles Darby Sabini or just Darby Sabini. His birth name was Ottavio Handley, and he would sometimes still use this surname, although his last name was legally changed to 'Sabini' after his mother remarried when he was 10-years-old. At various times, Sabini also used the forenames 'Ullano', 'Frank' and 'Fred', or the anglicised 'Octavius'.

== Early life ==
Sabini was born at 4 Little Bath Street, Saffron Hill, Holborn, London, on 11 July 1888, the area known as London’s Little Italy. He was the illegitimate child of either Ottavio Sabini (1853–1902), an Italian immigrant from Parma, or Charles Handley, an English builders' labourer. His mother was a Scottish woman known as Elizabeth (or Eliza) Handley. His mother later married Sabini at St Peter's, Clerkenwell, on 14 December 1898. Ottavio Sabini was a carman (a driver of a horse-drawn delivery vehicle) of Italian descent, whom Charles later would describe as a father, and adopt his surname.

The younger Sabini attended school at Drury Lane Industrial School, a school designed for neglected children who were considered at risk of delinquency, up until 1900. After Drury Lane, he started at Laystall Street Elementary School in Holborn. Eventually leaving school in July 1902, at age thirteen he became involved with boxing promoter Dai (Dan) Sullivan. Sabini was seen as a promising fighter but was unwilling to train hard so instead he became a bouncer at Sullivan's promotions in Hoxton Baths.

He married Annie Emma Potter (1892–1978), the daughter of William John Potter, at St Paul's in Clerkenwell, on 21 December 1913. The couple’s known children included at least three daughters and one son.

He was a tenor and his favourite song was Rosie Magoola.

Sabini gained a reputation as a hard man during a bar brawl at the Griffin public house in Saffron Hill in 1920, when he knocked out a well-known enforcer for a south London gang who had insulted an Italian barmaid; Sabini became known as a protector for both Italians and women in London.

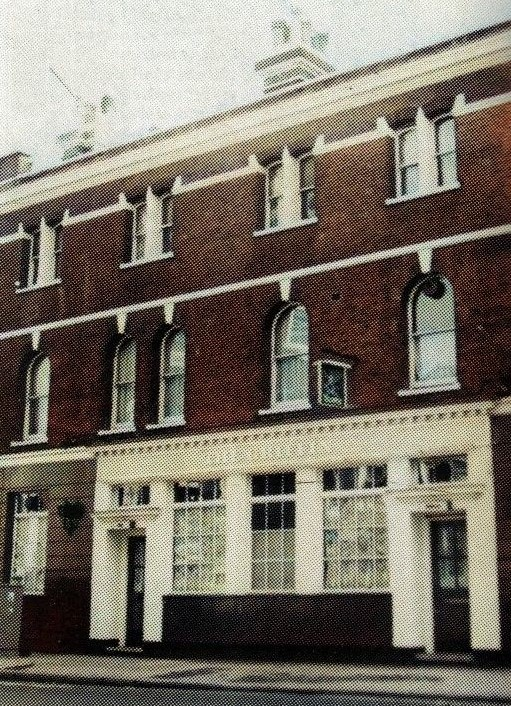
Colorized picture of the Griffin public house which was the headquarters of the Sabini gang.

== Gang years ==
As leader of the Sabinis he was known as the "king of the racecourse gangs" and the Godfather of Little Italy, he dominated the London underworld and racecourses throughout the south of England for much of the early twentieth century. Although his Italian Clerkenwell-based organisation gained the core of its income from racecourse protection rackets operated against bookmakers, it was also involved in a range of criminal activities including extortion, theft, as well as operating several nightclubs. It had an estimated 100 members, and is said to have included imported Sicilian gunmen and was notorious for razor attacks. At its peak, Sabini had extensive police and political connections including judges, politicians and police officials.

With no competition in the south, Sabini took over the protection rackets easily which led the Bookmakers and Backers Racecourse Protection Association to dispense with his services. Despite this, he became the top gangster in southern England. Sabini's men provided a variety of "services" to bookies which they did not need, such as tools they already had like chalk and "dots and dashes". Darby Sabini controlled five or six of what were considered the best pitches (a place for the bookies to work) at each event and had his men guarding his bookies, who worked on a "ten bob in the pound basis" (keep half of each pound made). The protection rackets proved to be extremely profitable and drew attention from other gangs such as Billy Kimber's Birmingham Boys. Violence between the groups increased, but the Birmingham boys were forced to vacate their claims when 23 of their number were locked up following the "Epsom Road Battle". In 1929, the Jockey Club and the Bookmakers' Protection Association took measures to prevent Sabini from controlling the best pitches and his other affairs on the racecourses came under attack from the police.

As he began to make less money, Sabini shifted his business to protection rackets at greyhound tracks as well as at drinking and gambling clubs located in the West End of London. Sabini managed to fend off challenges from rival gangs such as the Cortesi brothers from Saffron Hill, although his businesses were routinely harassed by street gangs such as the Hoxton mob. Sabini's power rested on an alliance of Italians and Jewish bookmakers. With the rise of Fascism in Italy antisemitism became more common in London's Italian community.

After the outbreak of the Second World War, Sabini was arrested at Hove Greyhound Stadium in April 1940 and interned as an enemy alien, despite his mixed parentage and inability to speak Italian. His internment on the Isle of Man lost him his position of authority in the racketeering industry in London and southern England. He was released in 1941, but in 1943 found guilty of receiving stolen goods and sentenced to 3 years in prison. Meanwhile, his only son was killed on active service in the RAF in Egypt. After the war, his empire was taken over by the White family led by Alf White and subsequently by the organisations of Jack Spot and Billy Hill. Sabini settled in Hove, Sussex, and became a bookmaker.

== Post-war period ==
Despite Sabini's wealth, he was not ostentatious even at his peak. He routinely wore a flat cap, collarless shirt, high-buttoned waistcoat, and dark suit. A gangland boss once stated that Sabini "stood for no liberties", and a bookie recalled that "he was the gentleman of the mob but he feared no one". Many referred to him as "Uncle Bob", and said that he was courteous and generous to women, children, the needy, and the Catholic church. A policeman stated that he "and his thugs used to stand sideways on to let the bookmakers see the hammers in their pockets". Sabini was said always to carry a loaded pistol, and he did not hesitate to order beatings and razor-slashings of his rivals.

When Sabini died at his home in Old Shoreham Road, Hove, on 4 October 1950, he left little money. However, his clerk was later found to have £36,000 which was believed to have been Sabini's cash. Despite this, his estimated wealth upon death was £3,665, equivalent in purchasing power to £126,000 in 2019.

== Media portrayals ==
On the BBC television drama Peaky Blinders, Sabini was portrayed by actor Noah Taylor.

== See also ==
- Messina Brothers
