= Doug Allen (actor) =

British actor

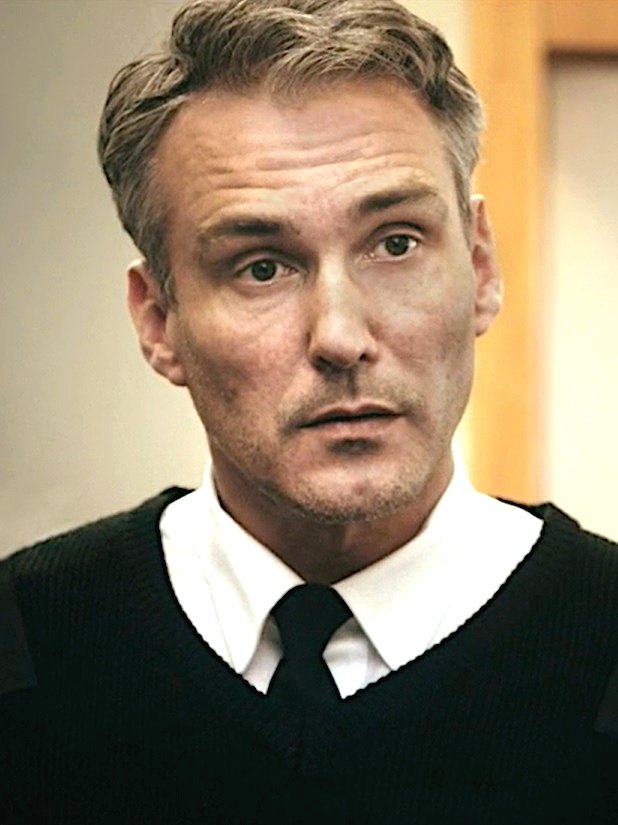
Doug Allen in We Are Monster 2014

Doug Allen is a British actor. He has appeared in films and television in Gangster No. 1 (2000), Band of Brothers (2001), EastEnders (2001-2002), Five Days (2007), and Das Boot (2022).

He won the Diamond Award for Best Male Actor at the 2020 Mindfield Film Festival for his performance in the film Hello Darlin in 2020.

== Early life and career ==
At age 15, Allen left school without any qualifications and joined the family business. At age 27, he left the family business to join the London Fire Brigade(LFB). During the LFB selection process, he successfully auditioned for the film Gangster No. 1 (2000), and decided to focus his career on acting.

In 2001, Allen played the role of Sergeant Alton More in the miniseries Band of Brothers. Between 2001 and 2002, he played the role of Nathan Williams in the BBC London soap opera EastEnders.

In 2002, he starred in the television movie Tough Love, alongside Ray Winstone and Adrian Dunbar.

In 2007, he played Gary Machin in the BBC / HBO collaboration series Five Days, among a cast that included Hugh Bonneville, Rory Kinnear, and Charlie Creed-Miles.

In 2018, he starred in the Marc price written and directed movie Nightshooters

In 2020, he played a lead role as ex-convict Les Dalton in the movie Hello Darlin, alongside Daisy badger, who played his daughter, and Siân Reeves who played his wife. The film won Best film award at 9 different film festivals, and Allen won the Diamond Award for Best actor at the 2020 Mindfield Film Festival in Albuquerque.

In 2022, Allen secured a recurring role as Commodore Francombe in 4 episodes of season 3 of the German U-boat series Das Boot.

== Filmography ==
=== Film ===
Year	Title	Role	Notes
1998	One True Thing	Club Bandleader	
2000	Gangster No. 1	Mad John	
2000	Christie Malry's Own Double-Entry	Frank the Father of Christie	
2000	Gangster No. 1	Mad John	
2008	Franklyn	Cleric 2	
2009	The Firm	Trigger	
2011	Screwed	Steadman	
2012	Nice Guy	Tommy Evans	
2013	Closed Circuit	Ryan	
2014	We Are Monster	Prison Officer Poll	
2014	Hoodies vs. Hooligans	Mitch	
2014	Sniper: Legacy	Simpson	
2015	Anti-Social	Chris	
2018	Nightshooters	Harper	
2019	Once Upon a Time in London	Albert Dimes	
2020	Hello Darlin'	Les Dalton	

=== Television ===
Year	Title	Role	Notes
2001	Hawkins	Joseph	Television film
2001	Band of Brothers	Alton M. More	8 episodes
2001–2002	EastEnders	Nathan Williams	45 episodes
2002	Tough Love	Greg Naylor	Television film
2003	The Bill	Scott Bartlett	Episode: "153: Salt of the Earth"
2004	Perfect Strangers	London Cabby	Television film
2005	The Inspector Lynley Mysteries	Lachlan	Episode: "In the Guise of Death"
2005	William and Mary	William II	2 episodes
2005	The English Harem	Richard	Television film
2007	Five Days	Gary Machin	4 episodes
2009	Trial & Retribution	Barry Bilkin	Episode: "Shooter: Part 1"
2009	Law & Order: UK	Gerry Craig	Episode: "Love and Loss"
2010	Sherlock	Joe	Episode: "The Great Game"
2013	By Any Means	Paul Banks	2 episodes
2014	Chasing Shadows	DI Gary Scanlon	2 episodes
2015	Spotless	Joey Samson	10 episodes
2016	The Level	Nash's Solicitor	2 episodes
2017	The Royals	Jack Parker	3 episodes
2017	The Halcyon	Jim Taylor	Episode #1.8
2018	Bulletproof	Sharp	Episode #1.2
2020	The Defeated	Major General Wright	Episode: "First Trick"
2022	Das Boot	Commodore Francombe	4 episodes
