= Alf White (gangster) =

English gangster

Alfred Henry White (1887–1942), better known as Big Alf White, was an English gangster, who headed the White Firm street gang.

== Biography ==
He was born in Copenhagen Street, Islington, London, to Alfred White, a drinking club proprietor, and Victoria Bayford. White became one of the most ruthless and vicious London gangsters between the World Wars and was the main force behind the Sabini gang of Clerkenwell, which he partnered in terrorising bookmakers on racecourses and street corners. He was also a local protection racketeer who extended his operations into West End clubland.

In his youth, White had been a member of the Bemerton Street Boys, who were constantly battling the Clerkenwell Boys and White Lion Street gang in local hooligan wars. In 1908, he led the Titanics in the "First Battle of the Nile" against the Sabinis. He supported the McCausland brothers' West End gang in its struggle with the Elephant gang for supremacy in Soho and, after the McCauslands were jailed, he became a leading light in the pickpocketing Titanic gang, together with his brother-in-law Charlie Wooder. Both were convicted in 1913 of pickpocketing. In 1919, the Titanic was crushed by the Elephant and Castle Mob. White went on to form the King's Cross Boys, and combined with the Sabinis and Alf Solomon's Yiddishers to form a counterbalance to the Elephant, Camden Town and Finsbury gangs, and their Birmingham Boys allies led by Billy Kimber. Years of racecourse warfare followed.

In 1922, White was sentenced to five years' imprisonment for his part in the shooting of George Sage and Freddie Gilbert outside the Southampton Arms in Mornington Crescent, Camden. Joe Sabini and others of the White-Sabini gang were also jailed. When George Sage's wife withdrew her evidence at his appeal hearing, White was released. White was involved in numerous fights where coshes, razors and guns were used. In 1925, he was badly beaten in a Paddington gambling club by a combination of Elephant Boys led by Tommy Benneworth and Bethnal Green Boys led by Dodger Mullins. In 1935, he was jailed for 12 months for a vicious assault in which his victim lost an eye.

White dropped his association with the Sabinis, transferred his operations to greyhound tracks, and became a part-owner of Hackney Wick Stadium.

He was married to Caroline Wooder, and their three children, Alf junior, Harry and Billy, took over leadership of the gang until they were crushed by Jack Comer in 1947.

Big Alf White died in Camden, London in late 1942.
