= Cortesi brothers =

British-Italian gangsters

The Cortesi brothers
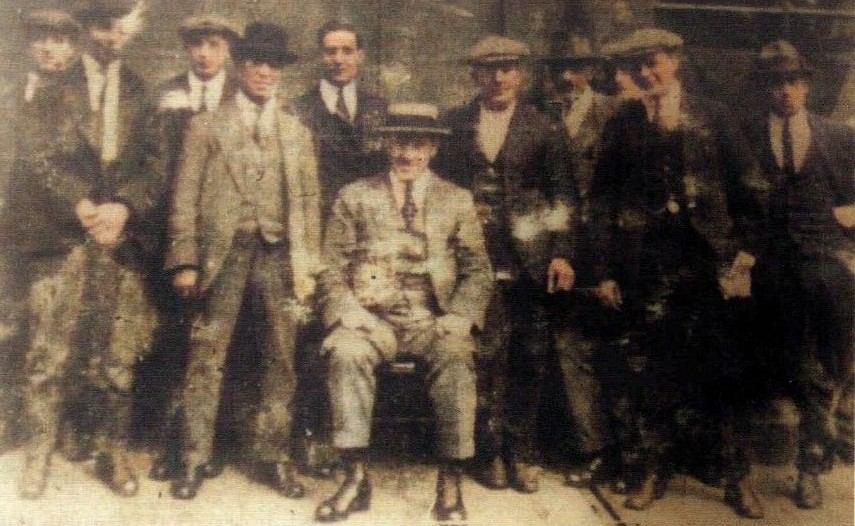
- Sabinis and Cortesis in 1920 (Harry Cortesi in the boater hat)
- Born: Augustus, George, Paul and Enrico; Paris
- Died: Augustus - 1949 / Enrico - 1954 / Paul - 1938 / George - 1972
- Other name: Frenchie
- Occupation: Gangsters
- Opponent: The Sabini gang
- Criminal charges: Gus and Enrico - attempted murder
- Penalty: 3 years
- Accomplice: Sandy Rice (Alexander Tomaso)

Cortesi family
- Years active: 1920s-1930s
- Territory: London
- Ethnicity: Italians
- Membership: 4 members, a dozen associates
- Activities: racketeering, extortion, gambling
- Allies: Messina family
- Rivals: Sabini gang

The Cortesi brothers - (Cortesi crime family) - were four siblings of Italian descent who became notorious crime figures in London during the first decades of the 20th century, along with their primary lieutenant, Alexander Tomaso, otherwise known as Sandy Rice. The brothers were Augustus ‘Gus’ Cortesi, Enrico ‘Frenchie’ Cortesi, Paolo ‘Paul’ Cortesi, and George Cortesi.

== Early life ==
Originating in Italy, the Cortesi family moved to Paris, France, where all four brothers were born. Their mother, Angele Cortesi, brought the family to England between 1891 and 1901. In 1901, the family is listed as residing at Little Saffron Hill, Clerkenwell in London.

== Gang years ==
As the Cortesi brothers reached adulthood, they became involved in protection racketeering of gamblers and bookmakers. They were close to criminals in the English Italian Sabini gang. However, the two families became rivals because the Cortesi brothers believed they were being denied a fair share of the proceeds from bookmaking and West End gambling clubs.

In 1922, the rivalry culminated in a confrontation at the Fratellanza Social Club at 23 Great Bath Street, Clerkenwell. On 20 November, Darby and Harry Sabini arrived at the club, probably to talk peace. Three women, including Louisa Doralli, Darby's goddaughter, occupied a table, and the only others present were the four Cortesi brothers and Alexander Tomaso. Words were exchanged and tempers boiled over. Paul Cortesi threw a cup of hot coffee in the face of Harry Sabini and they started to fight. The Cortesis were armed with revolvers, and Gus tried to shoot Darby Sabini, but his hand was knocked aside by Doralli. The bullet went through a window, but Darby was knocked down when Tomaso hit him with a bottle. Doralli then jumped in front of Harry Sabini to prevent Enrico Cortesi from shooting him. Harry pushed Doralli away, allowing himself to be shot in the stomach.

When police officers later attempted to arrest the Cortesi brothers at their homes, a large mob interfered. However, the Cortesi brothers later surrendered. Gus and Enrico Cortesi were jailed for three years for attempted murder. George and Paul Cortesi and Tomaso were found not guilty of assault and discharged with the judge comparing the case to the feud between the Montagues and the Capulets.

== Death ==
Augustus Cortesi (1886–1949) is buried in St Mary's Catholic Cemetery, Kensal Green. Enrico ‘Frenchie’ (1884–1954) died in Hackney, London. Paolo ‘Paul’ (1891–1938) died in Islington. George (1888–1972) died in St Pancras, London.
