= Holly Earl =

English actress (born 1992)

- Born: 31 August 1992 (age 34); Ealing, London, England
- Occupation: Actress
- Years active: 1997—present

Holly Earl (born 31 August 1992) is an English actress. She started her career as a child actor, in the television series Touching Evil (1997–1998), and may be best known for her recurring role in the first three seasons of Cuckoo (2012–2016), or her main cast roles in the series Beowulf (2016) and in the third season of Humans (2018).

Her films include Werner Herzog’s Queen of the Desert (2015), Once Upon a Time in London (2018) and her role as the 15-year-old version of a character played by Phyllis Logan in Last Train to Christmas (2021).

== Early life ==
Earl is from Ealing, West London. She attended Drayton Manor High School. Her older sister Elizabeth Earl is a former child actress. Both sisters are of Armenian descent.

== Career ==
Earl made her television debut at the age of four, playing Robson Green's daughter in Touching Evil. She then appeared as Young Kochanski in the eighth series of Red Dwarf, followed by a part in the BBC 1999 Christmas special The Greatest Store in the World. Her first film role followed in 2002 as May Bailey in Possession. She has also guest starred in Doctor Who, Doctors, Skins, and Cuckoo.

In 2012, she made her stage debut as Bertha in The Father at the Belgrade Theatre. She later received an Ian Charleson Award nomination for her role.

In 2015 she appeared as Ruby Hill in Ordinary Lies and in 2016 she was Kela in Beowulf.

In 2018, she starred as synth Agnes in the Channel 4 series Humans. In 2019, she starred as the lead in PlayStation game Erica. She also voices Lillia in the game League Of Legends.

In 2022, Earl appeared as the protagonist in the film Shark Bait, which was filmed in Malta. To prepare for the role, she trained each day reaching a peak in her physical fitness.

== Acting credits ==
=== Film ===
Year	Title	Role	Ref.
1999	The Greatest Store in the World	Angeline	
2002	Possession	May Bailey	
2004	Secret Passage	Young Clara	
2013	Dracula: The Dark Prince	Esme	
2015	Queen of the Desert	Cousin Florence	
2017	Loving Vincent	La Mousmé	
2018	Once Upon a Time in London	Aggie Vaux	
2021	Last Train to Christmas	Young Auntie Vi	
2022	Shark Bait	Nat	
2022	A Midsummer Night's Dream	Hermia	

=== Short Film ===
Year	Title	Role	Ref.
2010	Into the Night	Grace	
2023	A Midsummer Nightmare!	Titania	
2025	The Burn	Pen	

=== Television ===
Year	Title	Role	Notes	Ref..
1997–1998	Touching Evil	Louise Creegan	Recurring role (series 1–2)	
1999	Red Dwarf	Young Kochanski	Episode: "Pete: Part 1"	
1999	Ruth Rendell Mysteries	Lindsey	Episode: "The Lake of Darkness"	
2000	My Hero	Helen	Episode: "My Hero Christmas"	
2006	Wild at Heart	Georgia Chapman	Episode: "1.5"	
2010–2011	Casualty	Nita Clements	Recurring role (series 25)	
2011	Doctors	Summer Carroll	Episode: "Suffocating Love"	
2011	Doctor Who	Lily Arwell	Episode: "The Doctor, the Widow and the Wardrobe"	
2012	Skins	Poppy Champion	Episode: "Alo"	
2013	Father Brown	Ruth Bennett	Episode: "The Devil's Dust"	
2014	Benidorm	Elena	2 episodes (series 6)	
2014-2018	Two Housemates	Peaches	Recurring role (series 3) Web series	
2014	Law & Order: UK	Lisa Gardner	Episode: "Safe from harm"	
2014	The Musketeers	Céline	Episode: "Musketeers Don't Die Easily"	
2014	The Red Tent	Young Rachel	Episode: "Part 1"	
2014	Relentless	Shauna Brandt	Documentary Drama	
2012–2016	Cuckoo	Zoe	Recurring role (series 1–3)	
2015	Ordinary Lies	Ruby Hill	Episode: "1.4"	
2015	Crossing Lines	Chloe Hanbury	Episode: "In Loco Parentis"	
2016	Beowulf	Kela	Main cast	
2017	Our Ex-Wife	Ava	TV pilot	
2017	The Pact	Emily	TV Pilot	
2018	Humans	Agnes	Main cast (series 3)	
2024	Sister Boniface Mysteries	Elsie Calder-Marshall	Episode: "It's Just Not Cricket"	

Theatre

Year	Title	Role	Notes	Ref.
2011	The Father	Bertha	Belgrade Theatre	

=== Audio ===
Year	Title	Role	Notes	Ref.
2012	The Father	Bertha	BBC Radio 3	
2016	The Churchill Years Volume 01	Lilly Arwell	Big Finish	

=== Video games ===
Year	Title	Role	Notes	Ref.
2018	Star Ocean: Anamnesis	Sarah Jerand		
2019	Erica	Erica Mason		
2020	League of Legends	Lillia		
2024	Dragon's Dogma 2	Ulrika		
2024	Legends of Runeterra	Lillia		
2024	Stellar Blade	Kaya		
2024	Another Eden	Mazrika		
2025	Wuthering Waves	Roccia & Pero		
2025	The First Berserker: Khazan	Daphrona		
2025	Honkai: Star Rail	Hyacine		
2025	Star Overdrive	Nous		
2025	UNBEATABLE	Quaver		
2026	Dragon Quest VII Reimagined	E.L.L.I.E.		
2026	MENACE	Lieutenant Hayflick		
2026	Final Fantasy XIV: Dawntrail	Visna	Patch 7.56	
