= British in Italy =

Migrant community

British citizens in Italy
Total population
- British born 66,912 (2020); British citizens 30,325 (2020)

Regions with significant populations
- Rome, Lombardy, Tuscany, Piedmont, Campania, Liguria, Sardinia, Sicily

Languages
- English, Italian

Religion
- Anglicanism, Protestantism and Catholicism,

Related ethnic groups
- Britons, Australians

The British in Italy are a migrant community of 66,912 people in 2020, mainly present in Rome, Milan and Tuscany.

Foreigners holding British citizenship number 30,325

Most British people settled in the country to work.

== See also ==
- Italy–United Kingdom relations
- Italians in the United Kingdom
