= Italians in the United Kingdom =

British citizens of Italian descent

- Distribution of Italian citizens in England, Wales & Northern Ireland by local authority

Total population
- Italy-born residents in the United Kingdom: 292,412 – 0.4% (2021/22 Census) (Note: Does not include ethnic Italians born in the United Kingdom or those with Italian ancestry); England: 272,019– 0.5% (2021); Scotland: 14,486 – 0.3% (2022); Wales: 4,650 – 0.2% (2021); Northern Ireland: 1,257 – 0.07% (2021); Italian citizens/passports held: 368,738 (England and Wales only, 2021); Other estimates: c. 500,000 (by ancestry)

Regions with significant populations
- London; Bedford; Peterborough; Manchester; Birmingham; Glasgow; Glamorgan; Liverpool

Languages
- British English; Welsh; Scots; Italian and Italian dialects

Religion
- Roman Catholicism; Anglicanism; Presbyterianism; Orthodox; Judaism; Islam

Related ethnic groups
- Italians, Italian Scots, Welsh Italians, Genoese in Gibraltar, Italian Americans, Italian Australians, Italian Canadians, Italian New Zealanders, Italian South Africans, Italians, Italian Belgians, Italian Finns, Italian French, Italian Germans, Italian Romanians, Italian Spaniards, Italian Swedes, Italian Swiss, Corfiot Italians, Italians of Crimea, Italians of Odesa

Italians in the United Kingdom, also known as Italian Brits (Italian: italo-britannici) are citizens and/or residents of the United Kingdom who are fully or partially of Italian descent, whose ancestors were Italians who emigrated to the United Kingdom during the Italian diaspora. The phrase may refer to someone born in the United Kingdom of Italian descent, someone who has emigrated from Italy to the United Kingdom, or someone born elsewhere (e.g. the United States), who is of Italian descent and has migrated to the UK. More specific terms used to describe Italians in the United Kingdom include: Italian English, Italian Scots, and Italian Welsh.

== History ==
=== Roman Britain ===
The Romans from Italy were the first recorded Italians to settle in the British Isles, along with other people from various parts of the Roman Empire. They came as far back as 55 and 54 BC when Julius Caesar (initially landing in Deal) led expeditionary campaigns in the south-east of England, and then again in AD 43 when Emperor Claudius invaded and subsequently conquered the British islands. Historian Theodore Mommsen calculated that in the five centuries of Roman presence in the British isles, more than 50,000 Roman soldiers (mainly from The Balkans) moved to live permanently in Roman Britain.

=== Middle Ages ===
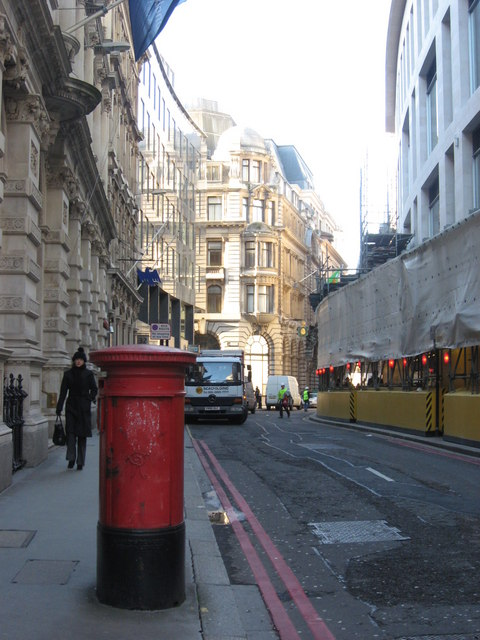
Lombard Street, London

Continuous contact with Rome and the Catholic world was initially restricted to the Celtic Christian, Brittonic-speaking portions of Britain where trading activities continued with the Mediterranean and Italy, continuing into the seventh century as non-Christian Anglo-Saxon kingdoms began to coalesce into England. Initially, the stable Anglo-British kingdoms of Wessex and then Northumbria followed the practices of Celtic Christianity, however powerful figures such as Alfred the Great, who had been anointed by the Pope in Rome, tended toward Roman Catholicism, especially after the Synod of Whitby, drawing merchants, men of culture, artisans, and educated Catholic clerics from the Latin West including Italy.

After the conquest of Anglo-Saxon England in 1066, the first recorded Italian communities in England began from the merchants and sailors living in Southampton. Lombard Street in London took its name from the small but powerful community from northern Italy, living there as bankers and merchants after the year 1000.

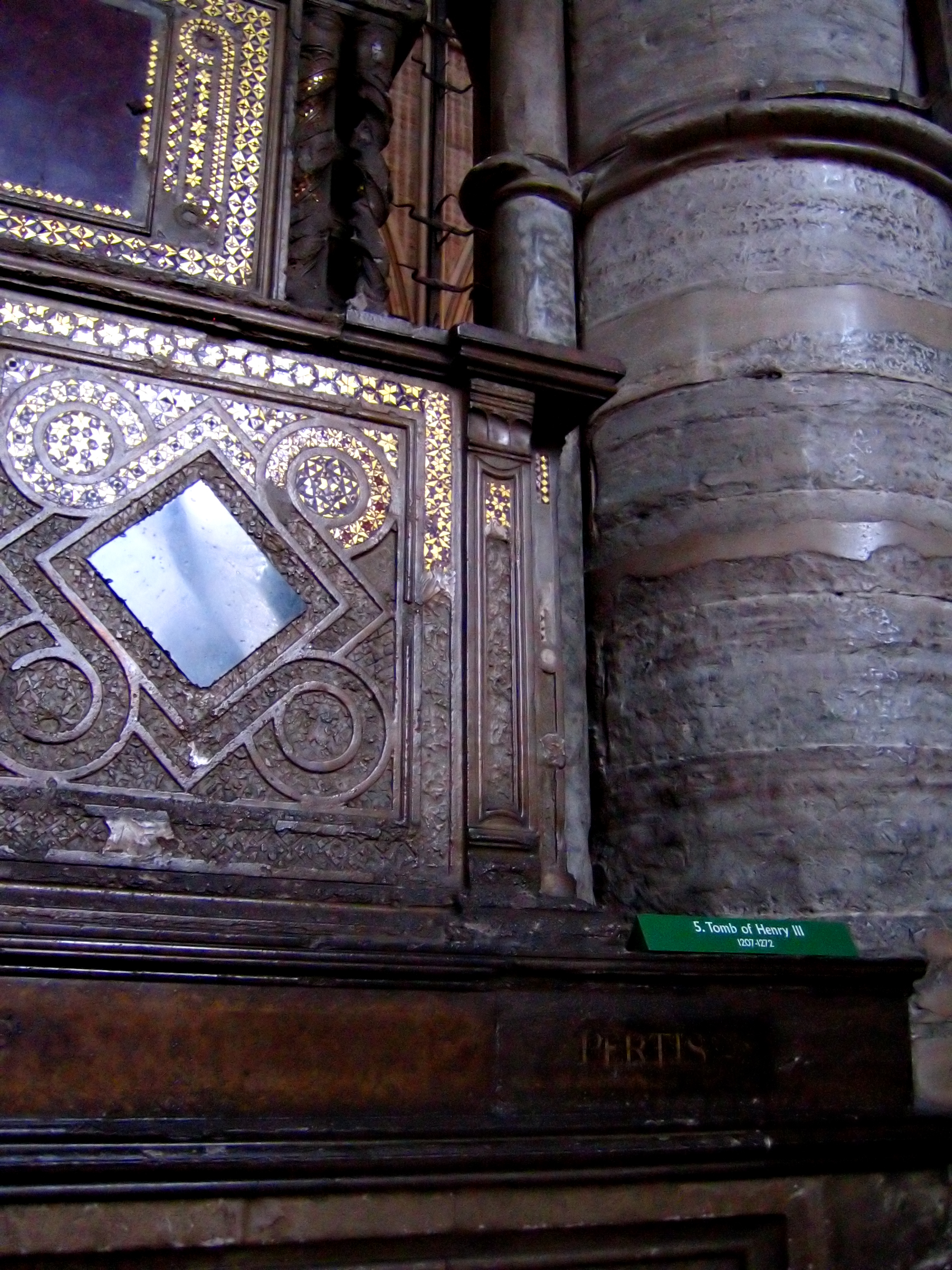
Medieval Italian craftsmanship at Westminster Abbey

The rebuilding of Westminster Abbey showed significant Italian artistic influence in the construction of the so-called 'Cosmati' Pavement completed in 1245, and a unique example of the style unknown outside of Italy, the work of highly skilled team of Italian craftsmen led by a Roman named Ordoricus. In 1303, Edward I negotiated an agreement with the Lombard merchant community that secured custom duties and certain rights and privileges. The revenues from the customs duty were handled by the Riccardi, a group of bankers from Lucca in Italy. This was in return for their service as money lenders to the crown, which helped finance the Welsh Wars. When the war with France broke out, the French king confiscated the Riccardi's assets, and the bank went bankrupt. After this, the Frescobaldi of Florence took over the role as money lenders to the English crown.

As bankers, the Frescobaldi financed ventures for numerous members of European royal families, notably their financial conquest of England, which Fernand Braudel has signalled as the greatest achievement of the Florentine firms, "not only in holding the purse-strings of the kings of England, but also in controlling sales of English wool which was vital to continental workshops and in particular to the Arte della Lana of Florence."

=== 15th to 18th centuries ===
According to historian Michael Wayatt, there was "a small but influential community" of Italians "that took shape in England in the 15th century, initially consisting of ecclesiastics, renaissance humanists, merchants, bankers, and artists."

Historian Alwyn Ruddock claimed to have found evidence that the navigator Giovanni Caboto ('John Cabot') who discovered North America in 1497, received backing from the Italian community in London for his voyage to North America. In particular, she suggested he found a patron in the form of Fr. Giovanni Antonio de Carbonariis, an Augustinian friar, who was also the deputy to the papal tax collector Adriano Castellesi. Ruddock suggested that it was Carbonariis, who certainly accompanied Cabot's 1498 expedition, and who was on good terms with the King, who introduced the explorer to Henry VII for the discovery expedition. Beyond this, Ruddock claimed that Cabot received a loan from an Italian banking house in London 'to go and discover new lands'.

In the aftermath of the English Reformation, amongst other religious refugees from the European continent, many Italian Protestants found Tudor England to be a hospitable haven, and brought with them cultural Italian ties. The fifteenth century also saw the birth of a pivotal Italo-Englishman in the form of John Florio, a famed language teacher, lexicographer, and translator. The Titus family is another significant group that settled in England in the time of the Renaissance. Notable was also Alberico Gentili's contribution to the fields of international law, who was a tutor of Elizabeth I and a regius professor of Oxford University.

The arts flourished under the Hanoverian dynasty, and this attracted many more Italian artisans, artists, and musicians to Britain. All of this developed in the United Kingdom a moderate Italophilia during the late Italian Renaissance. For example, in the 1790s, many Italians with skills of instrument making and glass blowing came over from Italy, France, and Holland to make and sell barometers. By 1840, they dominated the industry in England.

=== From Napoleon Bonaparte to World War I ===
The Napoleonic Wars left northern Italy with a destroyed agriculture, and consequently many farmers were forced to emigrate: a few thousand moved to the British isles in the first half of the nineteenth century.

From the 1820s to 1851... accounts for 4000 Italian immigrants in England, with 50% of them living in London. The regional origins of most were the valleys around Como, and Lucca. The people from Como were skilled artisans, making barometers and other precision instruments. People from Lucca specialised in plaster figure making. By the 1870s, the main regional origins of Italian emigration to Britain were the valleys of Parma in the north, and the Liri valley, half way between Rome and Naples. A railway network had been started by this time, and this helped the people from the Liri valley to migrate to the North of Italy, and then on to Britain. The people from Parma were predominantly organ grinders, while the Neapolitans from the Liri valley (now under Lazio) made ice cream...... the occupational structure of the immigrants, up to the 1870s, remained 'substantially the same'. After this date, all itinerant employment crossed regional demarcations.... The centre of the Italian community in Britain throughout the 19th Century, and indeed to the present day, is 'Little Italy', situated in a part of London called Clerkenwell..... description of its existence then, from an 1854 print, is of a "warren of streets around Hatton Garden". Dickens' Oliver Twist and Gustave Dore's prints of London at that time fill in the images. As numbers increased and competition grew fiercer, so Italians spread to the north of England, Wales, and Scotland. They were never in great numbers in the northern cities. For example, the Italian Consul General in Liverpool, in 1891, is quoted as saying that the majority of the 80–100 Italians in the city were organ grinders and street sellers of ice-cream and plaster statues. And that the 500–600 Italians in Manchester included mostly Terrazzo specialists, plasterers, and modellers working on the prestigious, new town hall. While in Sheffield, 100–150 Italians made cutlery..... of the 1000 or so Italians in Wales at the end of the 19th century, a third of them worked as seamen on British ships, a third worked in jobs that serviced shipping, such as ships chandlers, seamen's lodgings etc., and most of the rest worked in the coal mines. In 1861,.... there were 119 Italians in Scotland, the majority of them in Glasgow. By 1901, the Italian population was 4051. By this time, the Italian communities were becoming more affluent. The Italian Scottish community was "…almost all engaged in small food shops – either ice cream shops or fish restaurants."

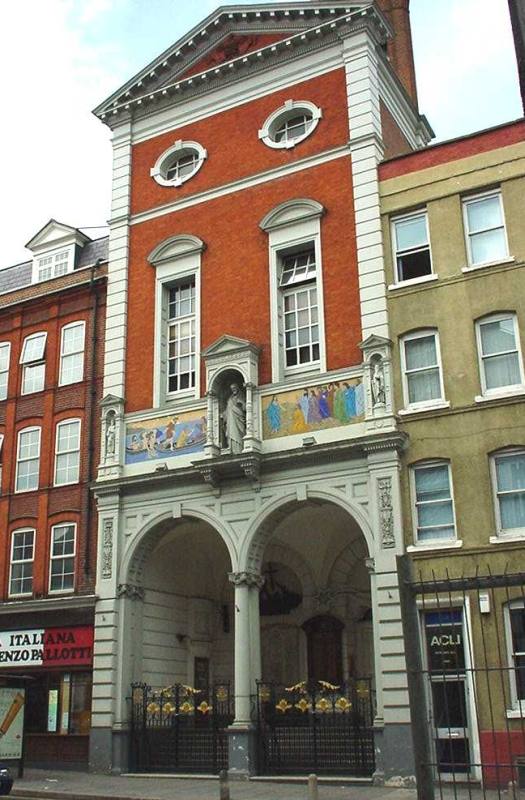
St Peter's Italian Church in London

Giuseppe Mazzini lived in London for some years, and promoted the construction of the Italian church of St. Peter in the 'Little Italy' of Clerkenwell (a London neighbourhood) The Italian-style basilica was inaugurated in 1863, and was the main place of reunion for the growing Italian community of London. The Risorgimento hero Mazzini also created an Italian school for poor people, active from November 1841, at Greville Street in London.

By the time World War I started, the Italian community was well established in London and other areas of the British Isles (there were nearly 20,000 Italians in the United Kingdom in 1915). All Italian born subjects living in Britain at the time of WW1 were regarded as 'aliens', and forced to register with their local police station. Permission had to be given by the police if a person wanted to travel more than 5 miles (8 kilometres) from their homes.

=== Second World War ===
When World War II came, the Italians in Great Britain had built a respected community for themselves. However, the announcement of Benito Mussolini's decision to side with Adolf Hitler's Germany in 1940 had a devastating effect. By order of Parliament, all aliens were to be interned. Although there were a few active fascists, the majority had lived in the country peacefully for many years, and had even fought side by side with British-born soldiers during the First World War.

This anti-Italian feeling led to a night of nationwide riots against the Italian communities on 11 June 1940. The Italians were now seen as a national security threat, linked to the feared British Union of Fascists, and Winston Churchill told the police to "collar the lot!" Thousands of Italian men between the ages of 17 and 60 were arrested after his speech.

In one of these transportations, a tragedy occurred: the sinking of the ocean liner Arandora Star on 2 July 1940 resulted in the loss of over 700 lives, including 446 British-Italians being deported as undesirable. Italians comprised almost half of the ship's 1564 passengers; the rest were British soldiers, and Jewish refugees. Sailing for Canada from Liverpool, the unescorted Arandora Star was torpedoed by the German submarine U-47 and sank within 30 minutes. One historian describes it as the "most tragic event in the history of the [British] Italian community... no other Italian community in the world has suffered such a blow." On 19 July, the Home Secretary, wrote a letter to Lord Halifax, the Foreign Secretary, in which he made it clear that he realised mistakes had been made in selecting Italians for the Arandora Star. Lord Snell was charged with conducting a government inquiry into the tragedy. He recognised that the method of selecting 'dangerous' Italians was not satisfactory, and the result was that among those earmarked for deportation were a number of non-fascists and people whose sympathies lay with Britain.

=== Since 1945 ===
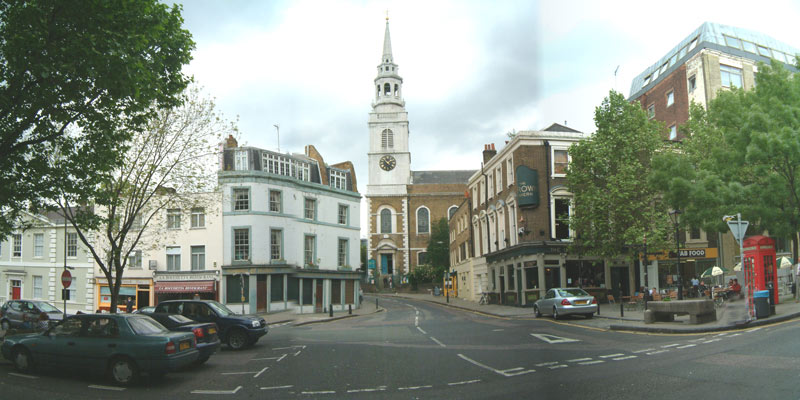
'Little Italy' in Clerkenwell, London

In the 1950s, Italian immigration started again to some areas of Great Britain; such as Manchester, Bedford, and Peterborough, even if in relatively limited numbers. It was made mainly from Lazio. But in the 1960s, it tapered off, and practically stopped in the 1970s. However, in the later years of the UK's membership of the European Union, the UK became the most favoured destination for Italian migrants.

The region of the country containing the most Italian Britons is London, where over 50,000 people of Italian birth lived in 2009. Other concentrations of Italians are in Manchester, where 25,000 Italians live and Bedford, where there are approximately 14,000 people of Italian origin.

The high concentration of Italian immigrants in Bedford, along with Peterborough, is mainly as a result of labour recruitment in the 1950s by the London Brick Company and the Marston Valley Brick Company in the southern Italian regions of Puglia and Campania. By 1960, approximately 7,500 Italian men were employed by London Brick in Bedford, and a further 3,000 in Peterborough. In 1962, the Scalabrini Fathers, who first arrived in Peterborough in 1956, purchased an old school and converted it into a church named after the patron saint of workers San Giuseppe. By 1991, over 3,000 christenings of second-generation Italians had been carried out there.

In 2007, there were 82 Italian associations in Great Britain.

A new ethnic minority group, nicknamed the Bangla-Italo, consisting of Bangladeshi Italians formed around London, Leicester and Manchester.

== British companies founded by Italians ==
- Ferranti – electrical engineering and computer equipment firm, founded in 1885.
- Marconi – British telecommunications and engineering company, formed in 1897.
- Arighi Bianchi – furniture store, founded in 1854.
- Grattan – catalogue company, founded in 1912.
- Forte – hotel and restaurant business, founded in 1935.
- Thomas Fattorini Ltd – designer and manufacturer of jewellery, trophies and medals, founded in 1827.
- Carluccio's – Italian restaurant chain, founded 1999.

== Demographics ==
White Italian population pyramid in 2021 (in England and Wales)

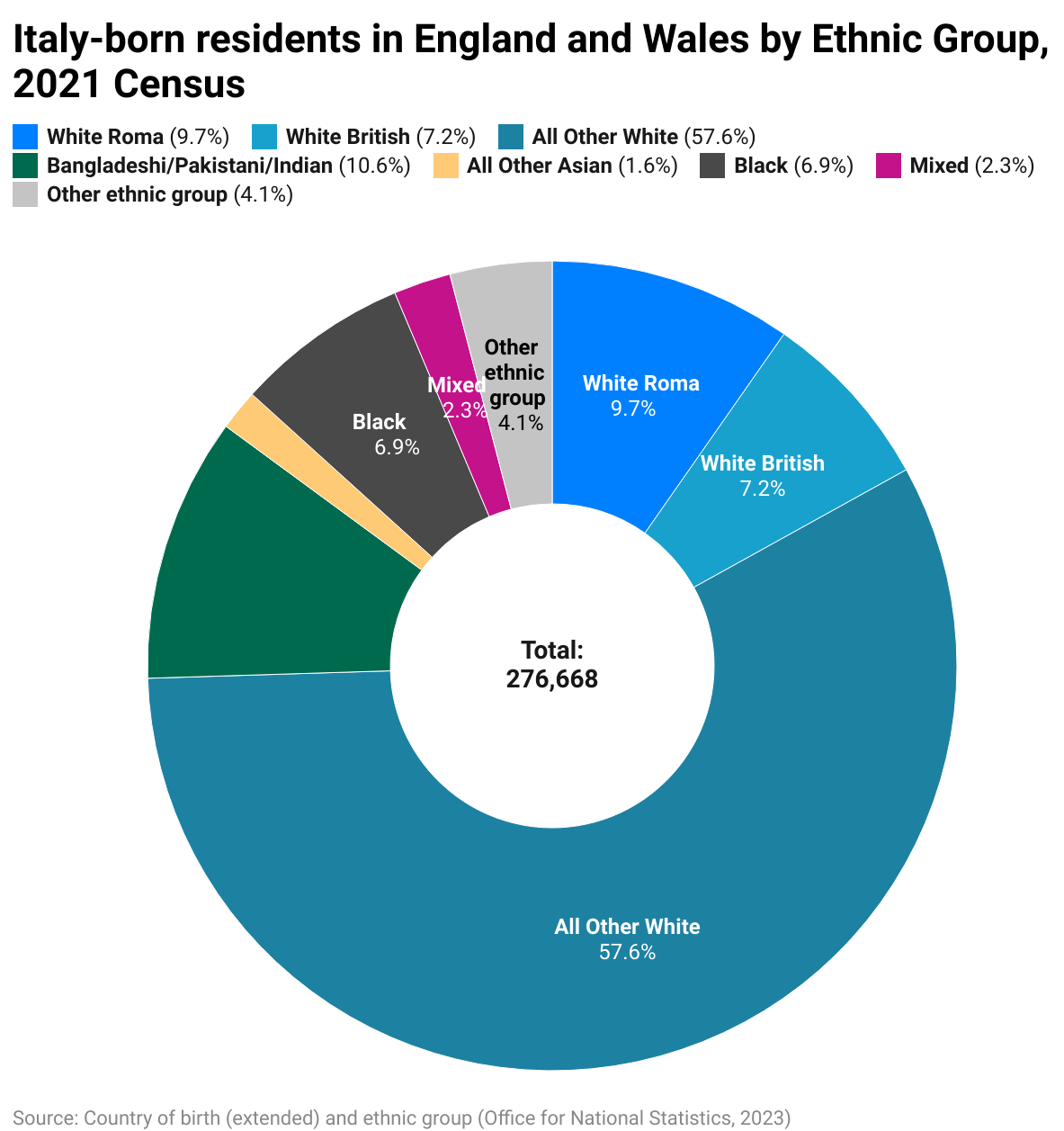
Italy-born residents by ethnic group (2021 census, England and Wales)

=== Population ===
There is no definitive number of Italians in the UK. Italian born residents peaked in the 20th century at around 108,985 in 1971, having risen from 5,063 in 1871, 20,389 in 1911, 38,427 in 1951 and 87,234 in 1961. They declined marginally in between 1971 and 1991 to 90,900 in 1991.

According to the 2021 UK Census, there were 276,669 Italian-born residents in England and Wales. However, the same source registers 368,738 Italian passport holders resident in England and Wales, and this statistic excludes Italians that also hold a British passport. A study commissioned by the Italian Consulate in London estimated 466,100 Italians registered as British residents in December 2021. A review article by the community interest company (CIC) I3Italy estimated around 500,000 Italians in the UK at the end of 2021.

Previously, the 2011 UK Census recorded 131,195 Italian-born residents in England, 3,424 in Wales, 6,048 in Scotland, and 538 in Northern Ireland. The 2001 Census recorded a total of 107,244 Italian-born people resident in the United Kingdom. Office for National Statistics (ONS) estimates put the equivalent figure for 2015 at 162,000 and 233,000 in 2019. In 2016, the Italian consulate in London estimated that 600,000 Italians were resident in the UK. Instead, in the UK, there are around 500,000 British people of Italian ancestry. An increase in the numbers of the Bangladeshi Italians in the UK have been witnessed since pre-Brexit.

As of June 2022, 509,100 (594,390 applications, of which 85,290 were made by repeated applicants) Italians registered under the UK's EU Settlement Scheme, successfully receiving pre-settled or settled status to remain in the United Kingdom. This figure has several limitations: first of all, it excludes Italians that came to the UK with a visa after Brexit. Further, it includes Italians that have left the UK: indeed, people that leave the UK after obtaining the status do not lose it before several years have passed. Finally, Italian citizens who also hold British citizenship did not need to register for the EU Settlement Scheme, so several people are missing from this statistic. According to the 2011 Census, Italian is the first language of 92,241 people in England and Wales.

For the period 2015 to 2016, 12,135 Italian students were studying in British universities. This was the third-highest figure amongst EU countries, and ninth globally.

Religion of Italian Born - England and Wales
Religion	Census 2021	
Religion	Number	%
Christianity	149,800	54.1%
No Religion	62,790	22.7%
Islam	31,678	11.4%
Sikhism	4,807	1.7%
Hinduism	2,529	0.9%
Buddhism	2,430	0.9%
Other Religions	1,780	0.6%
Judaism	449	0.2%
Not Stated	20,405	7.4%
Total	276,668	100%

=== Distribution ===
Italians and British-born people of Italian descent reside across the entire UK. Furthermore, unlike many ethnic groups in the country, there are substantial numbers of Italians outside England. Locations with significant Italian populations include London, where the 2011 Census recorded 62,050 Italian-born residents, Manchester with an estimated 25,000 people of Italian ethnicity, Bedford with an estimated 14,000 ethnic Italians, and Glasgow, which is home to the vast majority of the estimated 35,000+ Italian Scots.

A 2025 study about the Italian consular district of Manchester (which includes central and northern England) estimates around 130,000 Italian nationals in the area, largely in urban locations, with both Manchester and Birmingham having 28,000 people of Italian nationality. The same study estimates that about half of them comes from secondary migration routes through Italy from extra-european countries, primarily Pakistan, India, Ghana, Brazil and Bangladesh.

=== Little Italies ===
- Little Italy in Clerkenwell, London.
- The area around Wardour Street and Old Compton Street in Soho, London used to be known as Little Italy.
- Ancoats in Manchester used to be known as little Italy.
- The area around Scotland Road in Liverpool used to be known as Little Italy.
- The area around Fazeley Street in Digbeth, Birmingham, used to be known as Little Italy.
- Bedford, where the population is about 8% Italian or of Italian heritage.
- Hoddesdon, in Hertfordshire has a large Sicilian population.
- Glasgow is the centre of the Scottish Italian community.

== See also ==
- List of British Italians
- Ethnic groups in the United Kingdom
- Italy – United Kingdom relations
- Romano-British culture
- Italian migration to Britain
- Italian diaspora
- Accademia Apulia
- Lombard Street
- St Peter's Italian Church
- Italian Scots
- Welsh Italians
- Genoese in Gibraltar
- British in Italy
- Little Italy, London
