= Saffron Hill =

Street in the London Borough of Camden

Coordinates: 51°31′12.60″N 0°06′23.91″W

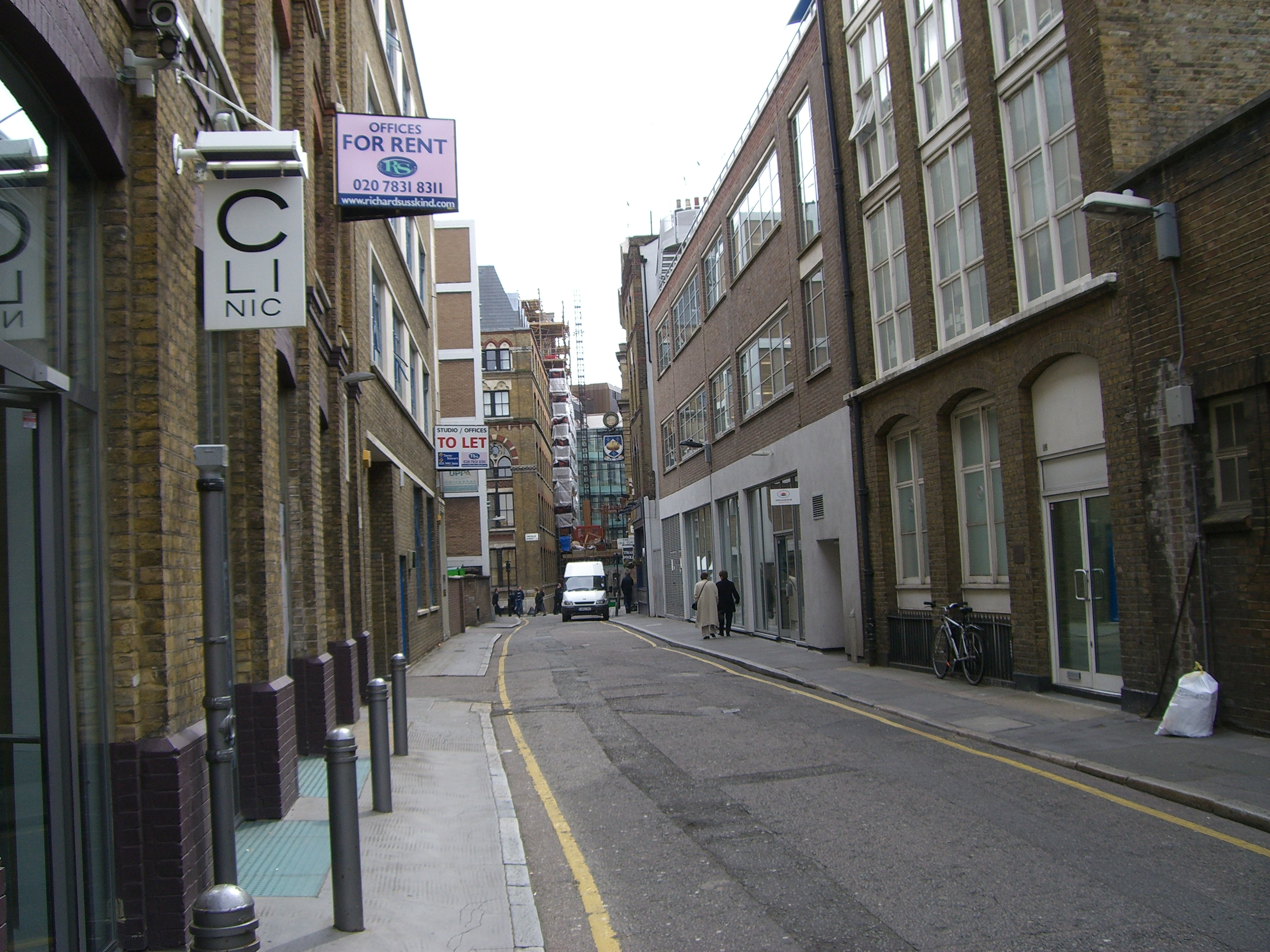
Saffron Hill looking south in 2006

A map showing the Saffron Hill ward of Holborn Metropolitan Borough as it appeared in 1952.

Saffron Hill is a street and former ward in Holborn, in the south eastern corner of the London Borough of Camden, between Farringdon Road and Hatton Garden. The name of the street derives from the fact that it was at one time part of an estate on which saffron grew. The ecclesiastical parish was St Peter, Saffron Hill, a daughter parish of Holborn, which is now combined with St Alban (the Martyr), Holborn.

In 1850, it was described as a squalid neighbourhood, the home of paupers and thieves. In Charles Dickens's novel Oliver Twist (1837), the Artful Dodger leads Oliver to Fagin's den in Field Lane, the southern extension of Saffron Hill: "a dirty and more wretched place he [Oliver] had never seen. The street was very narrow and muddy, and the air was impregnated with filthy odours".

== Little Italy ==
Saffron Hill is mentioned in the Arthur Conan Doyle Sherlock Holmes story The Adventure of the Six Napoleons, as the Italian Quarter where the Venucci family can be found. The area still retains a local nomenclature of Little Italy. Annually On the nearest Sunday to July 16 the procession of Our Lady of Mount Carmel takes place, a Roman Catholic manifestation of faith starting from St Peter's RC Church on Clerkenwell Road. It was from Saffron Hill that Darby Sabini operated his criminal gangs in the 1920s and 30s

Saffron Hill formed part of the liberty of Saffron Hill, Hatton Garden, Ely Rents and Ely Place which became part of the County of London in 1889. It was abolished in 1900 and formed part of the Metropolitan Borough of Holborn until 1965.

Saffron Hill has become more residential in recent years with the building of several blocks of 'luxury' apartments, including Da Vinci House situated in the former "Punch magazine" printworks and the architecturally distinctive Ziggurat Building.
