= Bruinsma =

Bruinsma is a surname of West Frisian origin. It originated as a patronymic surname, "son of Bruin" (Bruno). Notable people with this surname include:

- Evan Bruinsma (born 1992), American basketball player
- Klaas Bruinsma (drug lord) (1953–1991), Dutch drug dealer
- Klaas Bruinsma (translator) (born 1931), West Frisian translator
- Liesette Bruinsma (born 2000), Dutch Paralympic swimmer
- Robijn Bruinsma (born 1953), Dutch theoretical physicist
- Sikke Bruinsma (1889–1963), Dutch sports shooter
