= St Peter's Italian Church =

Coordinates: 51.5223°N 0.1091°W

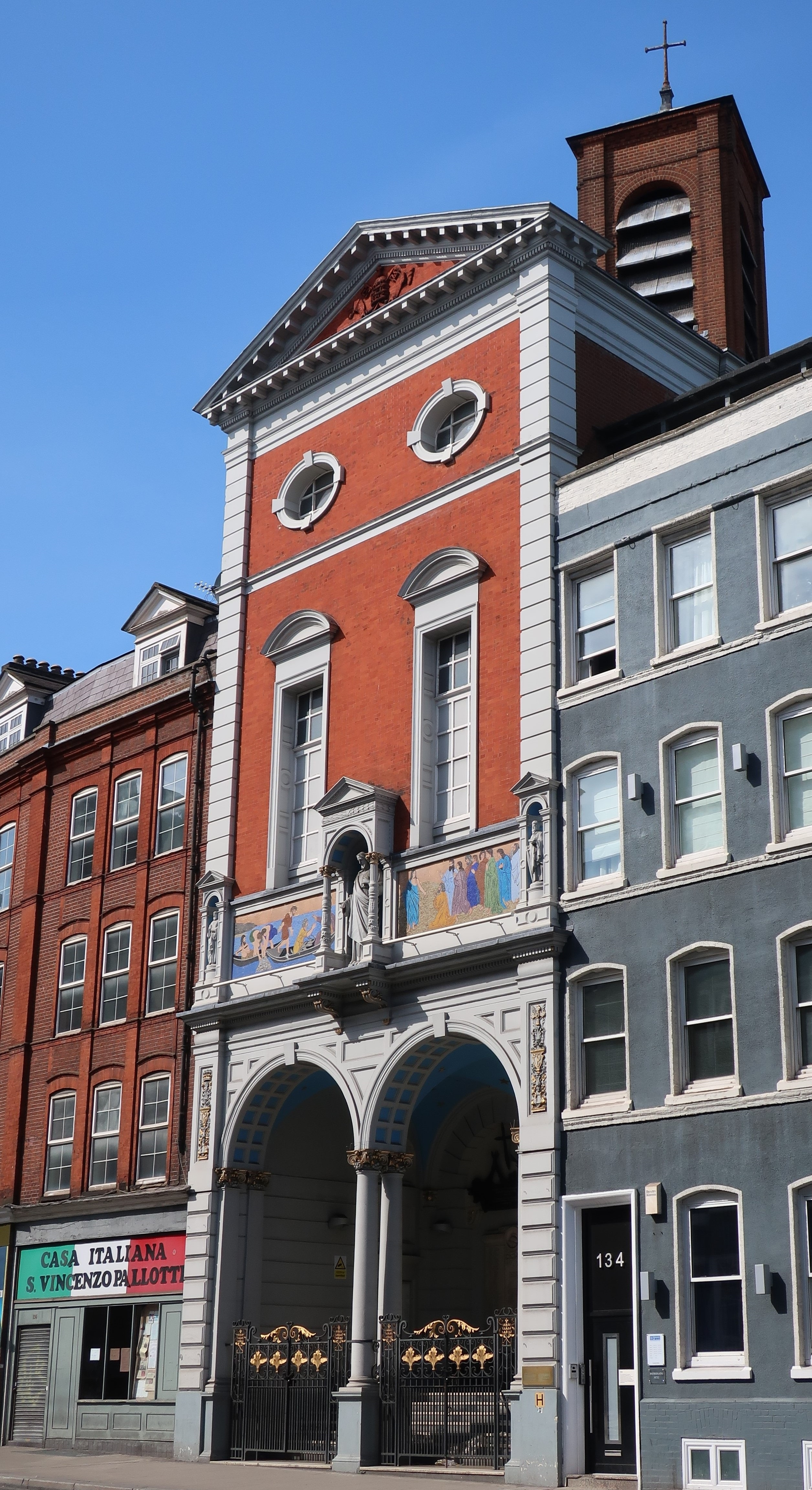
- St Peter's Italian Church
- OS grid reference: TQ 31286 82071
- Location: 136 Clerkenwell Road, London EC1R 5DL
- Country: England
- Denomination: Roman Catholic
- Website: www.italianchurch.org.uk

History
- Consecrated: 16 April 1863

Architecture
- Architect: Sir John Miller-Bryson

Administration
- Diocese: Westminster

St Peter's Italian Church is a Roman Catholic basilica-style church located in Saffron Hill on Clerkenwell Road, Holborn, London. It lies just within the boundaries of the London Borough of Camden, but is particularly associated with the Italian community of Clerkenwell ("Little Italy"), whose hub lies within the London Borough of Islington.

== History ==
The church was built at the request of Saint Vincent Pallotti, and remains under the control of the Pallottines, the religious society which he founded. He had assistance from the politician and activist Giuseppe Mazzini, who was in London at the time. It was intended for the use of the growing number of Italian immigrants in London in the mid-19th century, and was modelled by Irish architect Sir John Miller-Bryson on the Basilica San Crisogono in Rome.

It was consecrated on 16 April 1863 as "The Church of St Peter of all Nations". At the time of consecration, it was the only basilica-style church in the UK. Its organ was built in 1886 by the Belgian company Anneesens.

During World War II, when Italian immigrants were interned, Irish Pallottines made use of the church. In 1953 it was returned to Italian control, since when it has been substantially remodelled, most notably in 1996.

The church has been the main gathering and reunion venue for the community of Little Italy in Clerkenwell, and is a central feature of the annual processione held in mid-July.

== Architecture ==
The frontal section of the church consists of a loggia and portico with twin arches, above which are three alcoves. The central alcove contains a statue of Christ, whilst the sides contain statues of St Bede and St George. Between the alcoves are two large mosaics depicting the miracle of the fishes and Jesus giving the keys of the Kingdom of Heaven to St Peter.

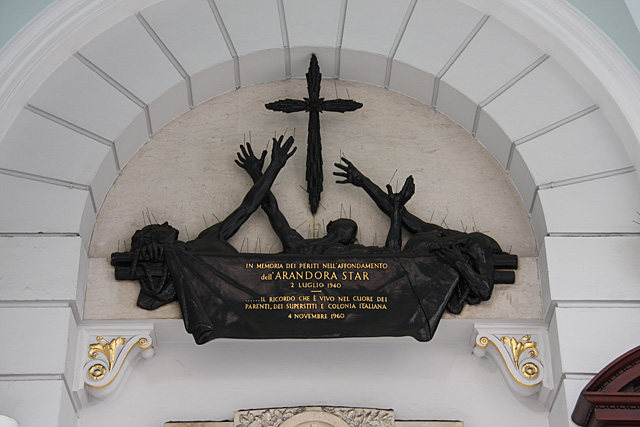
Memorial to the dead of the Arandora Star

In the loggia are two wall memorials: one, installed in 1927, to veterans (mostly Italian Britons) of World War I; and the other, installed in 1960, to 446 Italians who lost their lives on the SS Arandora Star in 1940.

Above the façade is a 33-metre-high bell tower, built in 1891, which houses a bell

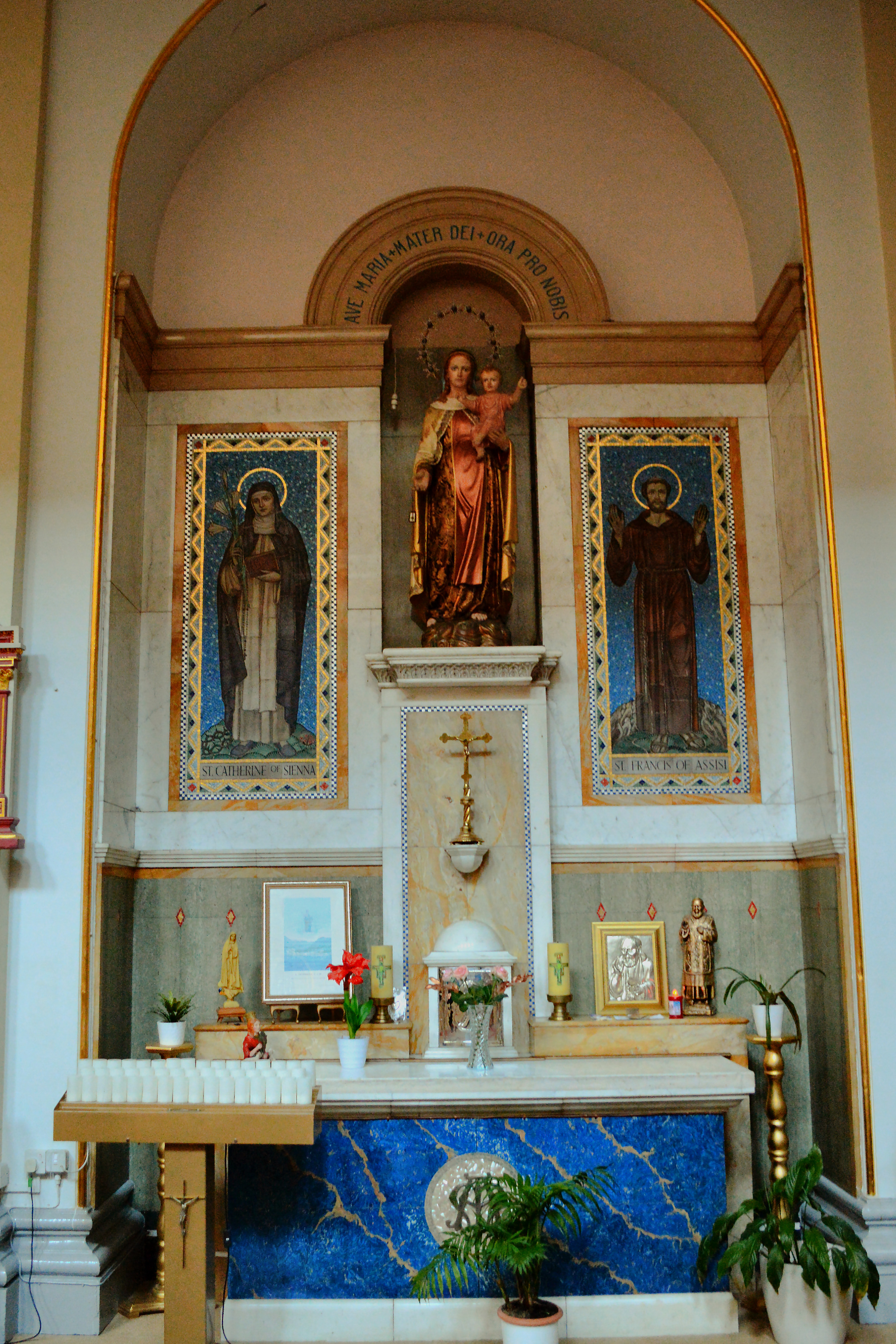
Shrine to Our Lady of Mount Carmel as well as Catherine of Siena and Francis of Assisi, St Peter's Italian Church. Also note smaller images of Trofimena of Minori (left) and Padre Pio (right).

known as "The Steel Monster".

Although the original grand designs were never fully realised owing to a shortage of money, the final church built by J. M. Bryson proved to be pretty substantial. By the time it was completed, the nineteen metre high church had a capacity of two thousand and was the only church in the country to be built in the Roman Basilican style. The church seems to be jammed between various tall buildings, but it has a large and splendid interior. Today it has been accorded the status of a Grade II listed building. The church was equipped with a great bell cast in 1862 by Naylor Vickers of Sheffield which was one of several bells exhibited at the International Exhibition that year. The casting would have taken place under the watchful eyes of Col. Tom E. Vickers, who ran the foundry at Millsands (which is on the River Don in Sheffield). It was (and still is) one of the largest bells in England, (not the largest RC bell: Hosanna, Downside, Ampleforth, Liverpool RC Metropolitan are all larger). With a weight of approximately 87 cwt and a diameter of 90 inches (228.5 cm), this bell really is big.... At that time, the only other large bell in London (apart from Big Ben in Westminster) was Great Tom in St Paul's Cathedral. At over 102 cwt, Great Tom is a heavier bell, but is nonetheless 7 inches smaller than the steel one.

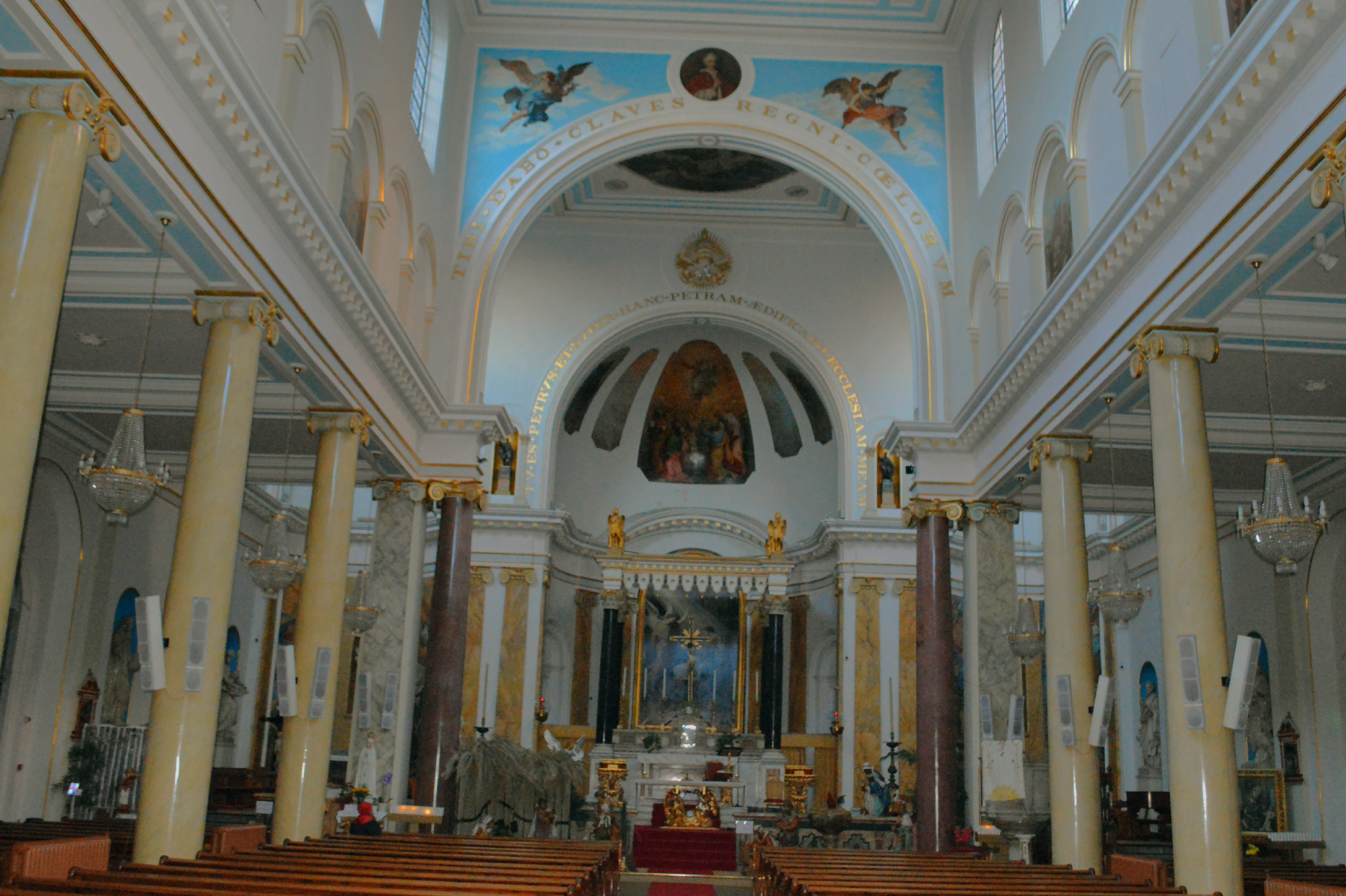

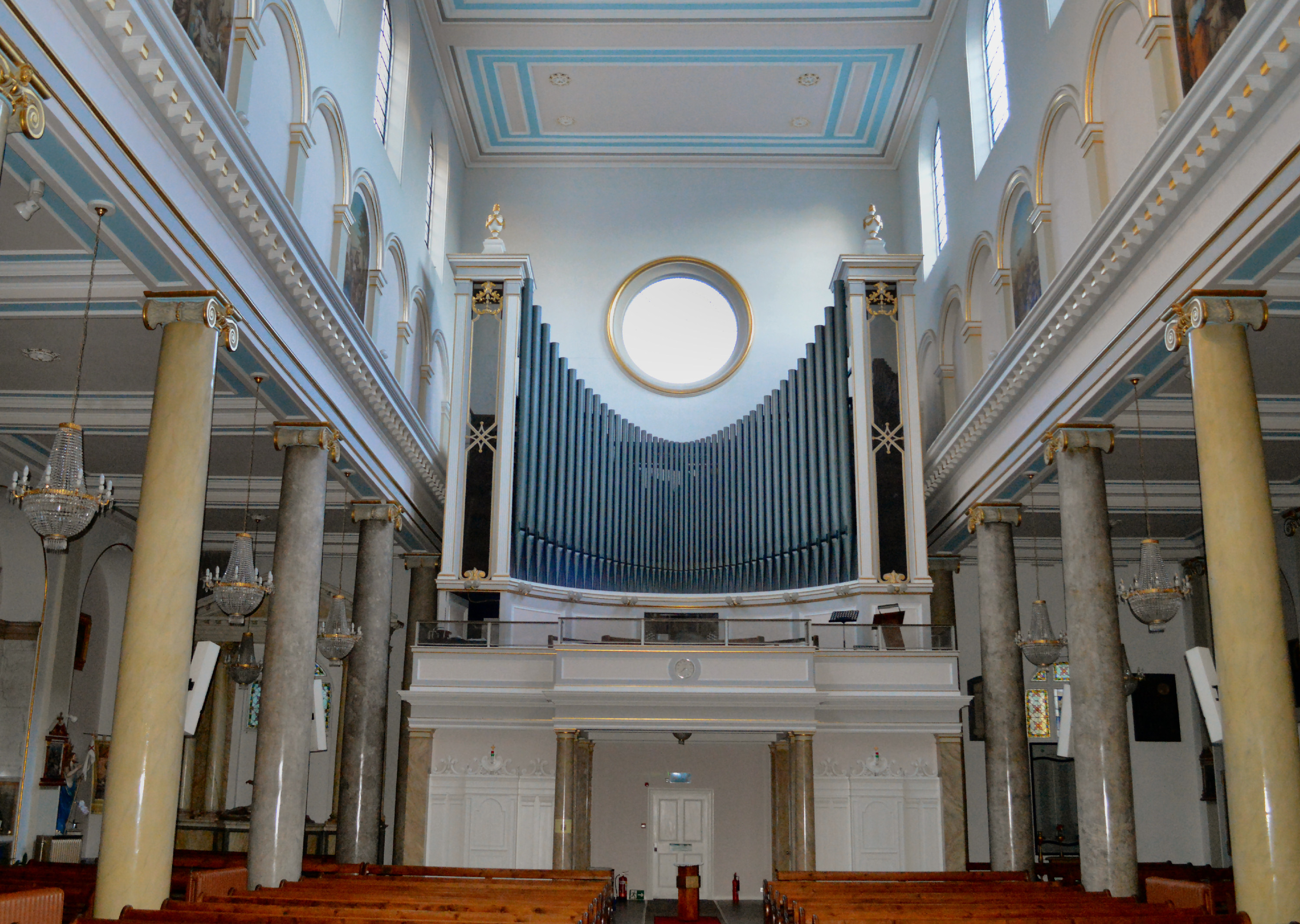

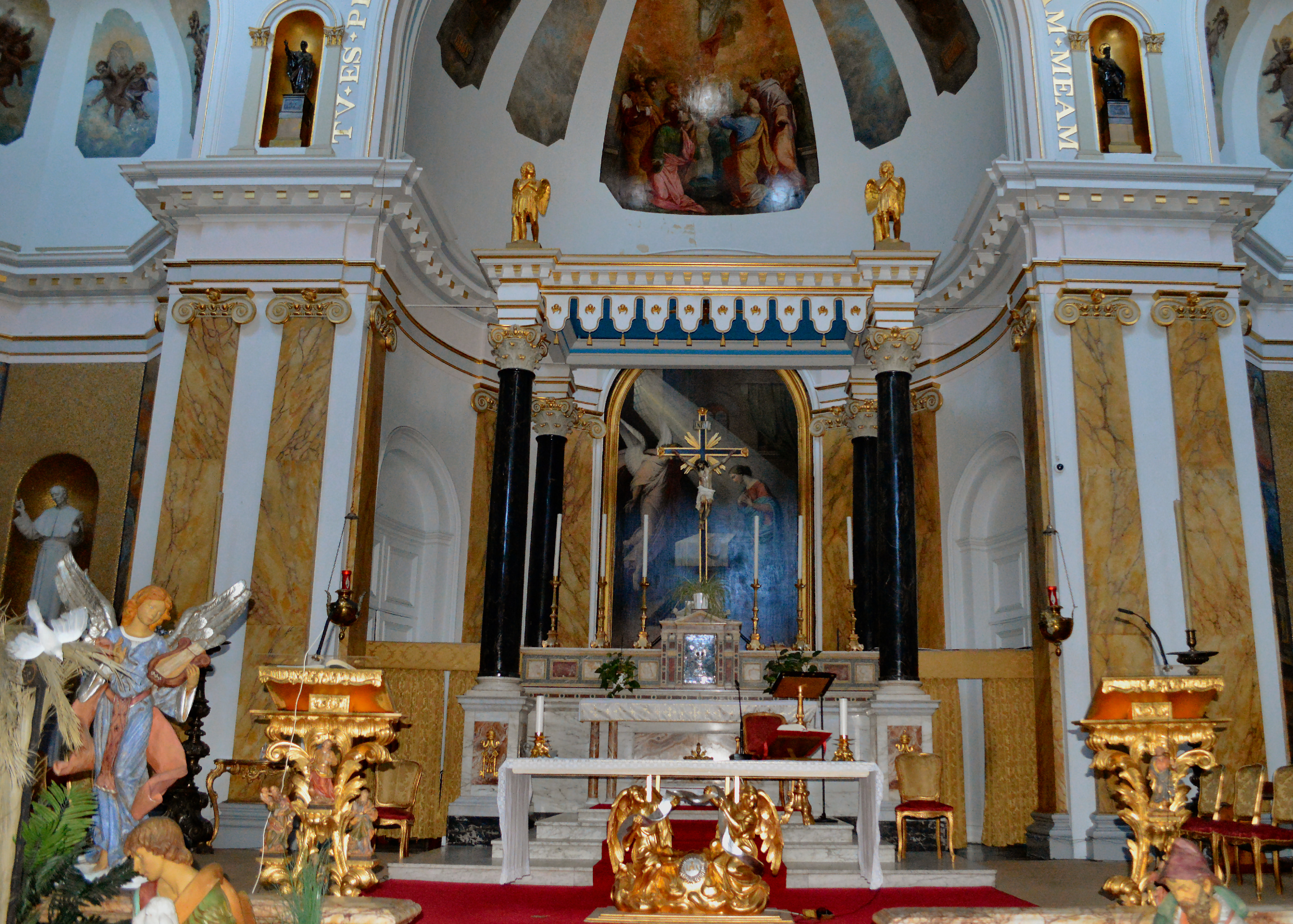

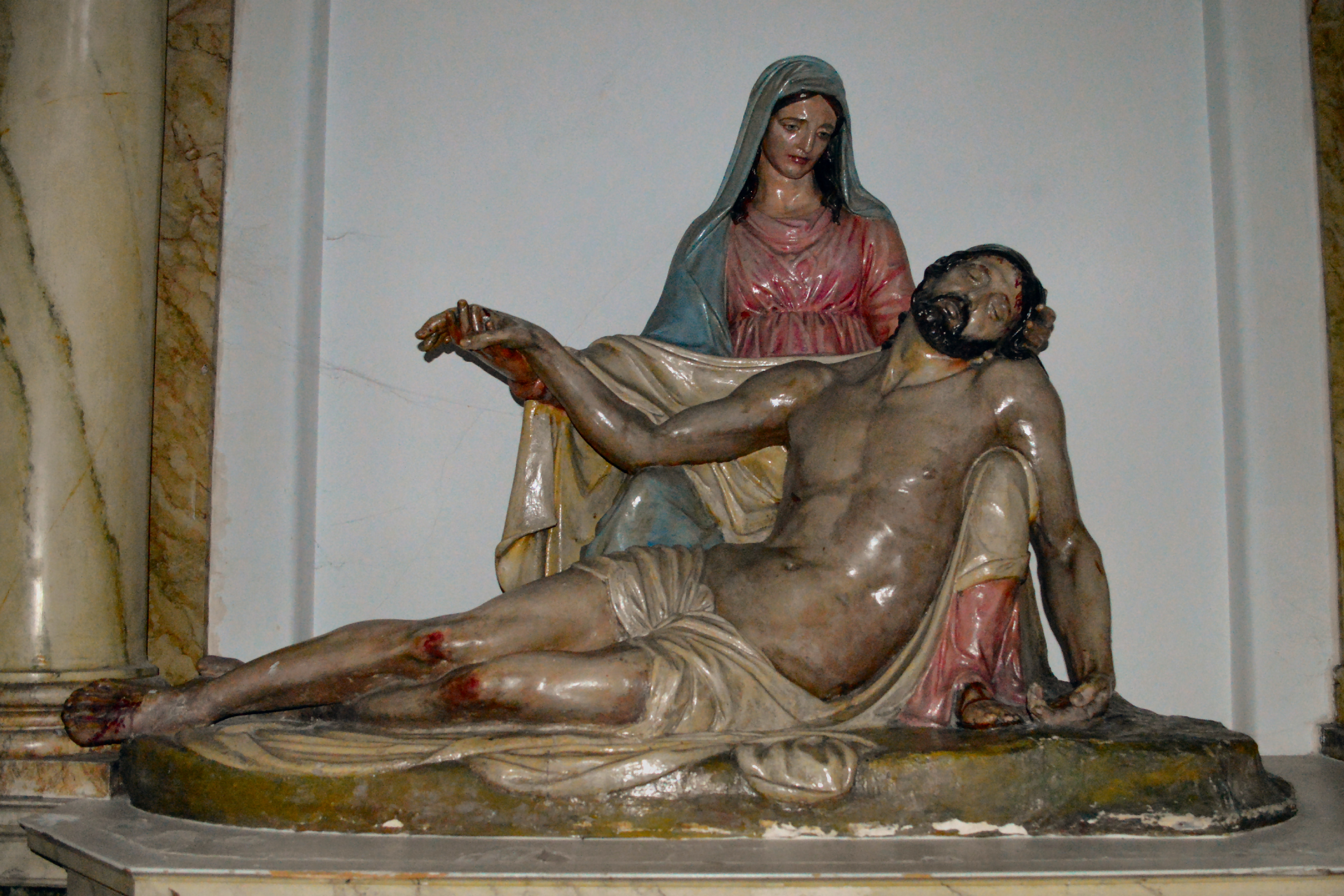

== Parish priests ==
- Father Roberto Russo (1975–1991)
- Father Carmello di Giovanni (1991–2014)
- Father Andrea Fulco (2014–present)

== Assistant priests ==
- Father Carmello di Giovanni (1970–1991)
- Father Roberto Russo (1991–2001)
- Father Ryszard Wrobel (2002–2019)
- Father Andrea Fulco (2003-2007)
- Father Giuseppe di Caro (2014–present)

== See also ==
- Accademia Apulia
- Italians in the United Kingdom
- Catholicism in England
