= Billy Hill (gangster) =

English criminal (1911–1984)

- Born: William Charles Hill; 13 December 1911; St Pancras, London, England
- Died: 1 January 1984 (aged 72); Bayswater, London, England
- Occupation: Criminal
- Known for: Organised crime in London from the 1920s–1960s
- Spouse: Agnes Kirkwood (m. 1934, separated)
- Partner: Phyllis Riley
- Children: 1

William Charles Hill (13 December 1911 – 1 January 1984) was an English criminal, linked to smuggling, protection rackets and extreme violence. He was one of the foremost perpetrators of organised crime in London from the 1920s through to the 1960s. His gang managed cash robberies and, in a scam, defrauded London's high society of millions at the card tables of John Aspinall's Clermont Club.

== Early life ==
Hill was born in St Pancras, London, on 13 December 1911, one of Amelia Jane (née Sparling) and Septimus James Hill's sixteen children. Growing up in an established criminal family, Hill committed his first stabbing at age fourteen. He began as a house burglar in the late 1920s and then specialised in smash and grab raids targeting furriers and jewellers in the 1930s. In 1934, he married Agnes Kirkwood.

== Criminal career ==
During the Second World War, Hill moved into the black market, specialising in foods and petrol. He also supplied forged documents for deserting servicemen and was involved in West End protection rackets with fellow gangster Jack Spot. In the late 1940s, he was charged with burgling a warehouse and fled to South Africa. Following an arrest there for assault, he was extradited to England, where he was convicted for the warehouse robbery and served time in prison. This was his last jail term. After his release, he met Gypsy Riley (1925–2004), born Phyllis Blanche Riley but better known as "Gyp Hill", who became his common-law wife.

In 1952, he planned the Eastcastle Street postal van robbery netting £287,000 (equivalent to £7.19 million in 2025) and in 1954 he organised a £40,000 (£951,000) bullion heist. No one was ever convicted for these robberies. He also ran smuggling operations from Morocco during this period. In 1955, Hill wrote his memoir Boss of Britain's Underworld, ghostwritten by the journalist Duncan Webb. In it he described his use of the shiv:

I was always careful to draw my knife down on the face, never across or upwards. Always down. So that if the knife slips you don't cut an artery. After all, chivving is chivving, but cutting an artery is usually murder. Only mugs do murder.

Hill was mentor to twins Ronnie and Reggie Kray, advising them in their early criminal careers.

== Phone tapping ==
In late 1956 Home Secretary Gwilym Lloyd George authorised the tapping of Hill's phone. At the time gang warfare had broken out in London between Hill and erstwhile partner in crime, Jack Spot. In 1956, Spot and wife Rita were attacked by Hill's bodyguard, Frankie Fraser, Bobby Warren and at least half a dozen other men. Fraser and Warren were sentenced to seven years in prison for their acts of violence.

The Bar Council approached the police and requested the tapes to provide evidence for an investigation into the professional conduct of Hill's barrister, Patrick Marrinan. Sir Frank Newsam, Permanent Secretary at the Home Office, allowed them access. When this use of tapping powers was revealed to Parliament in June 1957, Leader of the Opposition Hugh Gaitskell demanded a full explanation. Rab Butler pledged that it would not be a precedent and that he would consider withdrawing the evidence and asking the Bar Council to disregard it.

Marrinan was subsequently disbarred and expelled by Lincoln's Inn but Butler was forced to appoint a committee of Privy Counsellors under Sir Norman Birkett to look into the prerogative power of intercepting telephone communications.

== "Big Edge" ==
In the 1960s, Hill was busy fleecing aristocrats at card tables. In Douglas Thompson's book The Hustlers and the documentary on Channel 4, The Real Casino Royale, the club's former financial director John Burke and Hill's associate Bobby McKew, claimed that John Aspinall worked with Hill to cheat the players at the Clermont Club. Some of the wealthiest people in Britain were swindled out of millions of pounds, thanks to a gambling con known as "the Big Edge".

Marked cards could be discovered too easily; instead the low cards were slightly bent across their width in a small mangle before being repackaged. High cards were slightly bent lengthwise. Hill's card sharks were introduced to the tables by Aspinall; they could read whether a card was high, low or an unbent zero card (10 to king) thus gaining a 60–40 advantage. The final stage involved "skimming" the profits from the table to avoid attention. On the first night of the operation, the tax-free winnings for the house were £14,000 (equivalent to £190,000 in 2023). According to McKew, the 18th Earl of Derby lost £40,000 (equivalent to £560,000 in 2023) in one night.

The club's former financial director John Burke quit in late 1965, a year into the scam. He had been tipped off about an investigation but Aspinall was determined to carry on. Aspinall no longer had someone to deal with "the dirty end" of the operation. After two years' operation the Big Edge was closed. Hill respected Aspinall's decision, and the partnership was dissolved.

== Later life ==
Hill was also involved in property development. He bought the biggest nightclub in Tangier, Churchills, for his wife, Gypsy, who ran it from 1966 until the mid-1970s. An affair he had with dancer Diana Harris led to the birth of a son, Justin, in 1973. In 1975, Diana Harris died by suicide, and Gypsy and Billy Hill adopted Justin.

Hill died from myocarditis at his home in Bayswater on 1 January 1984, aged 72; his death certificate said he worked in "demolition".

== Other ==
In 1963, Mickey Spillane was playing Mike Hammer in The Girl Hunters in London, where he met Hill and showed him around the set. When the prop department could not find Spillane a real M1911 pistol, Hill brought the producers several real pistols to use in the film.

Hill's only child, Justin, republished his father's memoirs in December 2008 with a modern introduction and previously unpublished photographs.

Hill is a major character in the 2019 film Once Upon a Time in London.

Hill features in the 2025 Sky History documentary series Original Gangsters with Sean Bean.
