= Albert Dimes =

British-Italian gangster (1914–1972)

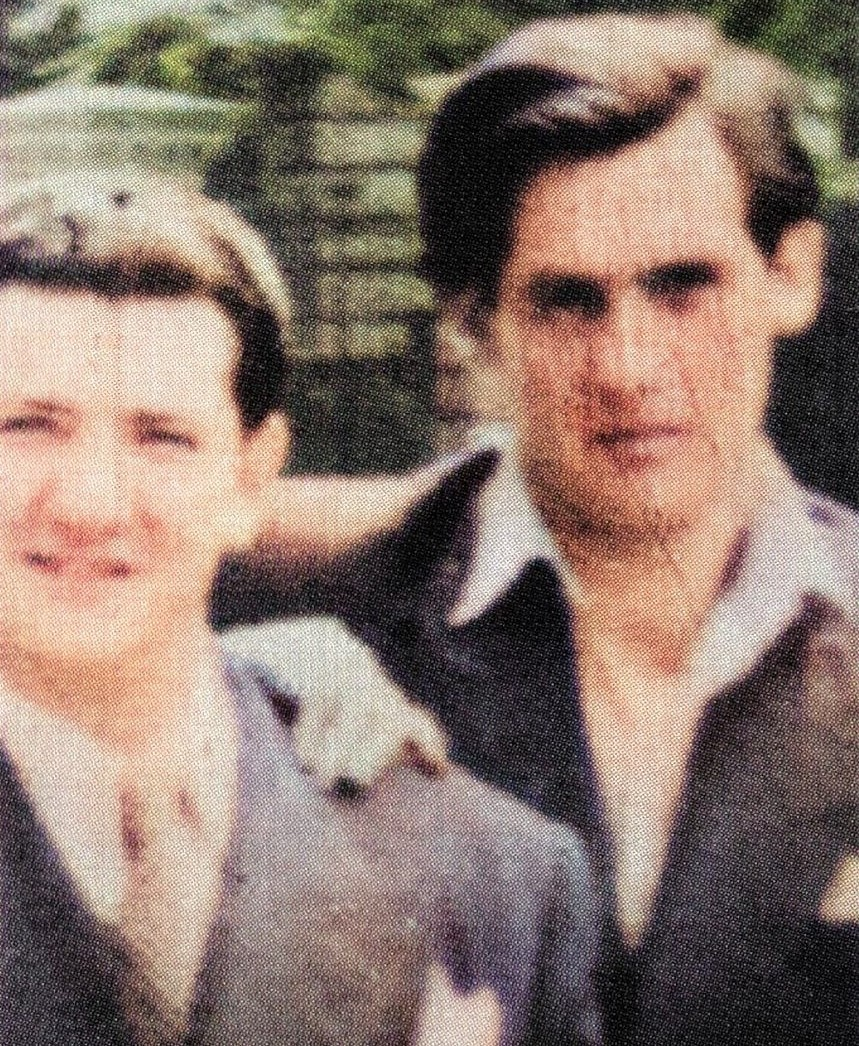
- Dimeo (right) with Bert Rossi
- Born: George Alberto Arthur Dimeo; 1914; Hamilton, South Lanarkshire
- Died: November 1972 (aged 57–58); Beckenham
- Occupations: Gangster and bookmaker
- Years active: 1940s - 1960s
- Allegiance: Lucchese crime family (probably)

George Albert "Italian Al" Arthur Dimeo (1914 – November 1972) was a Scottish-Italian criminal and enforcer, who operated in Little Italy, London.

== Early life ==
Born in Hamilton, South Lanarkshire to an Italian father and Scottish mother, he moved to London with his family and grew up in Little Italy, London. He went on to run Soho's nightclubs and bars with Antonio (Babe) Mancini and Pas Papa (Bert Marsh) also being involved in bookmaking and loansharking during the 1940s and 1950s.

== Criminal career ==
In July 1941 Dimes was convicted with Joseph Collette of attacking Edward Fletcher at a Soho Club in Wardour Street. The Recorder noted that the incident took place "under the shadow of a graver offence. One man had lost his life and another man was under sentence of death." He dismissed any prejudice against second generation Italians. Harry Capocci was acquitted and Dimes was bound over for three years. In the same incident, Harry "Little Hubby" Distleman was stabbed to death by Antonio Mancini.

In August 1955, Dimes was arrested with rival gangster Jack Spot during a knife fight in Soho. Neither man was charged. As a result of his arrest, Spot's power in the city's underworld declined. The battle almost spread to politics when Dimes tried to use National Labour Party members against rivals Bud Flanagan and Spot, Jewish gangsters involved in funding the 43 Group. Although this is disputed by Bert Rossi a close friend and opposition gang member of Jack Spot.

In 1966, Dimes helped to arrange a conference between New York mafiosi and the Corsican Francisci brothers, apparently regarding investing in London casinos. An associate of Charlie Richardson, his presence in Soho delayed the Kray twins from moving into the area for several years.

== Personal life and death ==
Dimes died in November 1972 at his home on Oakwood Avenue, Beckenham, South London from cancer. His funeral was held on 20 November 1972 in Beckenham. The Kray Twins sent a wreath that read "To a fine gentleman – From Reg & Ron Kray". The wreath was reportedly destroyed by friends of the family who believed the association brought shame.

== Popular culture ==
The character Johnny Bannion, played by Stanley Baker in the 1960 film The Criminal, was reportedly claimed by director Joseph Losey to be partly based on Dimes.

== Bibliography ==
- Devito, Carlo. Encyclopedia of International Organized Crime. New York: Facts On File, Inc., 2005. ISBN 0-8160-4848-7
