= Messina Brothers =

Criminal organisation

Messina Debono family
- Founded by: Giuseppe Messina
- Founding location: Valletta, Malta
- Years active: 1900s–1950s
- Territory: London in England, Malta, Alexandria in Egypt Sanremo in Italy and Brussels in Belgium
- Ethnicity: Italian, Maltese
- Membership (est.): 6 members, a dozen associates
- Criminal activities: Prostitution, pimping, procuring, pornography production, women's trafficking
- Allies: Cortesi family

The Messina Brothers or Messina family were five brothers who led a criminal organisation in London from the 1930s to the 1950s.

== Early life ==
The father of the five Maltese Messina brothers was Giuseppe Messina (possibly born as Giuseppe Calabrese) from Linguaglossa in Sicily. In late 1890, he went to Malta and worked in a brothel in the notorious Strait Street (Triq Strada Stretta) in Valletta. He married a Maltese woman from Zejtun called Virginia Debono and had two sons, Salvatore (born 20 August 1898, Ħamrun) and Alfredo (born 6 February 1901, Ħamrun). He then moved to Alexandria, Egypt, in 1905, where there was a thriving Maltese community and built a chain of brothels. The other three sons, Eugenio (born 1908, Alexandria, Egypt), Attillo (born 1910, Alexandria), and Carmelo (born 1915, Alexandria), were born in Egypt. All five brothers joined their father in running brothels and prostitution. In 1932, the Egyptian authorities expelled Giuseppe and his sons. The family returned to Malta as Giuseppe had Maltese citizenship. In 1934, Eugenio, the third son of Giuseppe, moved to London with his French prostitute wife Colette. She helped establish the sex trade in London. The other Messina brothers followed Eugenio and established themselves in Soho, London.

== Gangsters ==
On arrival in the UK, the Messina brothers took up English names. Eugenio became Edward Marshal, Carmelo became Charles Maitland, Alfredo became Alfred Martin, Salvatore became Arthur Evans, and Atillio became Raymond Maynard. Properties were bought throughout the West End, and businesses were set up. They quickly became involved in their father's former trade and, during the years following the Second World War, imported women from Belgium, France and Spain. With a steady and highly profitable prostitution operation and adequate protection from members of the Metropolitan Police, the Messinas ran unchecked in the city. By the late 1940s, they were operating thirty houses of prostitution on Queen Street, Bond Street and Stafford Street. The women handed over 80 per cent of their earnings to the brothers. By the 1950s, the police estimated that at least 200 of London's most expensive prostitutes were Messina girls. Prosecution proved difficult as many of the women who worked for them had valid passports, making it hard to make a case for deportation of either the women or the brothers. Later, they started recruiting local English girls by the age-old technique of giving good-looking girls a good time and possibly promises of marriage, followed by being induced into prostitution. Attilio Messina reportedly stated to the press: "We Messinas are more powerful than the British Government. We do as we like in England."

== Downfall ==
In the late 1940s, Duncan Webb, a crime reporter on the tabloid newspaper The People, began writing articles claiming that information was being leaked from Scotland Yard to Alfred Messina and on 3 September 1950 the paper published a front-page article, “Arrest These Four Men”, by Webb describing prostitution in the West End, including interviews with more than 100 prostitutes, and revealing names, dates, photographs and other information crucial to any police investigation.

The activities of the Messinas soon gained the attention of Scotland Yard, which formed a special investigative task force under Superintendent Guy Mahon to engage in an aggressive campaign against them. By the end of the 1950s, the Messinas had been forced to flee the country. Eugenio, Carmelo, Salvatore and Attilio left England on 19 March 1951. Alfredo Messina was arrested and charged with living off the immoral earnings of his girlfriend, Hermione Hinden, and with attempting to bribe the policeman, Superintendent Guy Mahon – who arrested him. He was sent down for two years in prison on bribery and prostitution charges. Attilio Messina was sentenced to four years' imprisonment after being caught attempting to illegally re-enter the country in April 1959. On his release, he went to live in Italy.

Eugenio and Carmelo Messina eventually resurfaced in Belgium living in a 10-bedroom flat on Avenue Louise in Brussels. On 31 August 1955 Eugenio and Carmelo were arrested as they were closing a deal with two Belgian girls. They were taken to court on 23 June 1956 on charges of procuring women, illegal possession of firearms, possessing fake passports, and entering Belgium illegally. Eugenio received a six-year sentence. Carmelo was acquitted because of lack of evidence. The conviction and imprisonment of Eugenio were partly because of the testimony of detectives from Scotland Yard. The Police forces of Italy, France, Belgium and the UK were involved in the investigations and evidence collection for the prosecution of the brothers. Carmelo was banned from re-entering England, but he did and was arrested on 3 October 1958 for being an illegal immigrant. He was found sitting in a car in Knightsbridge. He received a six-month prison sentence. After completing his prison sentence, he was deported to Italy. He went to live in Sanremo. He later married Maria Theresa Vervaere on 12 March 1970 and died the same day. Alfredo Messina died in Brentford in 1963. The remaining brother, Salvatore Messina, went into hiding and was never apprehended. Messina brothers laid the foundation for Maltese gangsters, pimps and criminals in Soho who followed the Messina brothers into the twenty-first century.

== See also ==
- Charles Sabini (leader of the Sabini gang, which once operated in Clerkenwell).
