= Frankie Fraser =

English gangster (1923–2014)

- Born: Francis Davidson Fraser; 13 December 1923; Waterloo, London, England
- Died: 26 November 2014 (aged 90); Denmark Hill, London, England
- Occupation: Criminal

Francis Davidson Fraser (13 December 1923 – 26 November 2014), better known as "Mad" Frankie Fraser, was an English gangster who spent 42 years in prison for numerous violent offences.

== Early life ==
Francis Davidson Fraser was born on Cornwall Road in Waterloo, London, the youngest of five children of a partly Native American seaman and an Irish-Norwegian washerwoman. He grew up in poverty in a Roman Catholic household, where he learned to recite prayers in Latin. At the age of five, he moved with his family to a flat on Walworth Road, Elephant and Castle.

Although his parents were not criminals, Fraser turned to crime aged 10 with his sister Eva, to whom he was close. He was a deserter during the Second World War, escaping from his barracks on several occasions. It was during the war that he first became involved in serious crime, with the blackout and rationing, combined with the lack of professional policemen due to conscription, providing ample opportunities for criminal activities such as stealing from houses while the occupants were in air-raid shelters.

In 1941, Fraser was sent to borstal for breaking into a Waterloo hosiery store, then given a 15-month prison sentence at HM Prison Wandsworth for shop-breaking. Such were the criminal opportunities during the war, Fraser joked in a television interview years later that he had never forgiven the Germans for surrendering.

In 1942, while serving a prison sentence in HM Prison Chelmsford, he came to the attention of the British Army. Although he was conscripted, Fraser later boasted that he had never once worn the uniform, preferring to ignore call-up papers, desert, and resume his criminal activities.

== Post-war ==
After the war, Fraser was involved in a smash-and-grab raid on a jeweller, for which he received a two-year prison sentence, mostly served at HM Prison Pentonville. It was during this sentence that he was first certified insane and was sent to Cane Hill Hospital before being released in 1949.

During the 1950s, Fraser's main occupation was as bodyguard to well-known gangster Billy Hill. After being sent to HM Prison Durham for taking part in bank robberies, he was again certified insane and this time was sent to Broadmoor Hospital. Afraid of being heavily medicated for bad behaviour, Fraser stayed out of trouble and was released in 1955. The following year, the British mobster Jack Spot and wife Rita were attacked, on Hill's say-so, by Fraser, Bobby Warren and at least half a dozen other men. Both Fraser and Warren were given seven years for their acts of violence.

== Richardson Gang ==
It was in the early 1960s that Fraser first met Charlie and Eddie Richardson of the Richardson Gang, rivals to the Kray twins. According to Fraser, they helped him avoid arrest for the Great Train Robbery by bribing a policeman. Together they set up the Atlantic Machines fruit-machine enterprise, which acted as a front for the criminal activities of the gang.

In 1966, Fraser was charged with the murder of Richard Hart, who was shot at Mr Smith's club in Catford while other Richardson associates, including Jimmy Moody, were charged with affray. A witness changed his testimony and the charges were eventually dropped, though Fraser still received a five-year sentence for affray. He was also tried in court in the so-called 'Torture trial', in which members of the Richardson Gang were charged with burning, electrocuting and whipping those found guilty of disloyalty by a kangaroo court. Fraser himself was accused of pulling out the teeth of victims with a pair of pliers. Following a trial at the Old Bailey in 1967, he was sentenced to ten years' imprisonment.

== Violence ==
Fraser's 42 years served in over 20 different prisons in the UK were often coloured by violence. He was involved in riots and frequently fought with prison officers and fellow inmates. He also attacked various governors. Fraser was one of the ringleaders of the major Parkhurst Prison riot in 1969, spending the following six weeks in the prison hospital because of his injuries. Involvement in such activities often led to his sentences being extended. Whilst in Strangeways, Manchester in 1980, Fraser was 'excused boots' as he claimed he had problems with his feet because another prisoner had dropped a bucket of boiling water on them after Fraser had hit him; he was allowed to wear slippers. He was released from prison in 1985.

== Later life and death ==
Fraser became a minor celebrity of sorts, appearing on television shows such as Operation Good Guys, Shooting Stars, and the satirical show Brass Eye, where he said Noel Edmonds should be shot for killing Clive Anderson (an incident invented by the show's producers), and writing an autobiography. In 1996, he played (his friend) William Donaldson's guide to Marbella in the infamous BBC Radio 4 series A Retiring Fellow. In 1999, he appeared at the Jermyn Street Theatre in London in a one-man show, An Evening with Mad Frankie Fraser (directed by Patrick Newley), which subsequently toured the UK.

Fraser also appeared as East End crime boss Pops Den in the feature film Hard Men, a forerunner of British gangster movies such as Lock, Stock and Two Smoking Barrels, and had a documentary made about his life, Mad Frank.

Fraser gave gangland tours around London, where he highlighted infamous criminal locations such as The Blind Beggar pub. In 1991, Fraser was shot in the head from close range in an apparent murder attempt outside the Turnmills Club in Clerkenwell, London. Part of his mouth was shot away in the incident. He refused to discuss the shooting with the police.

Fraser was an Arsenal fan, and his grandson Tommy Fraser was a professional footballer. Another of Fraser's grandsons, James Fraser, also spent a short time with Bristol Rovers. Another grandson, Anthony Fraser, was being sought by police in February 2011 for his alleged involvement in an £5 million cannabis smuggling ring.

Fraser's wife, by whom he had four sons, died in 1999. He was a resident at a sheltered accommodation home in Peckham. According to Eddie Richardson, Fraser had Alzheimer's disease for the last three years of his life. In June 2013, the 89-year-old Fraser was served with an anti-social behaviour order (ASBO) by police after a row with another resident. On 21 November 2014, he fell critically ill during leg surgery at King's College Hospital, Denmark Hill and was placed into an induced coma. On 26 November, Fraser died, aged 90, after his family made the decision to turn off his life-support machine.

In the 2016 film The Fall of the Krays, Fraser was portrayed by Josh Myers.

== Books ==
- Fraser, Frank; Morton, James (2000). Mad Frank's Diary: A Chronicle of the Life of Britain's Most Notorious Villain. Virgin Books. ISBN 1-85227-874-9.
- Fraser, Frank; Morton, James (1995). Mad Frank: Memoirs of a Life of Crime. Time Warner Paperbacks. ISBN 0-7515-1137-4.

== See also ==
- True crime
