= Jack Comer =

English gangster (1912–1996)

- Born: Jacob Colmore; 12 April 1912; Mile End, London, England
- Died: 12 March 1996 (aged 83)
- Other name: Jack Spot
- Occupation: Gangster

Jack "Spot" Comer (born Jacob Colmore ; 12 April 1912 – 12 March 1996) was a Jewish gangster who rose to rule London's underworld.

== Early life ==
Born Jacob Colmore in Mile End, London, Comer was the youngest of four children. His father was a Jewish tailor's machinist who, to escape antisemitic pogroms, had emigrated to London with his wife, whose maiden name was Lifschinska, from Łódź, Poland, around 1900. It was a bad time for Jewish immigrants and refugees who arrived in Britain during this period: antisemitism was both in the streets and the corridors of power. This antagonistic environment was, in part, organised by the British Brothers' League. To assimilate more into English society, the family changed their name from Comacho to Colmore, and later to Comer.

Comer grew up in a Jewish ghetto street in Fieldgate Mansions, Whitechapel, along the west side of Myrdle Street, across from the Irish in terraced houses along the east side. At the age of seven, Comer joined his first gang, which was made up of boys from the Jewish side of Myrdle Street who fought their Catholic rivals from the other end of the street. Proving his abilities as a street fighter, Comer soon joined Alfred Solomon's gang, The Yiddishers, and saw a route out of poverty. As was customary in gangs, Comer got a nickname: he was called "Spot", either because he was always "on the spot" when there was trouble, or because of a mole on his left cheek.

In pre-Second World War Britain, antisemitism and fascism was a feature of everyday lives for Jews. Comer gained a reputation amongst Jews as a someone to call on for protection. He often found himself in violent encounters with antisemites, sometimes being paid but at other times getting involved out of principle. He was involved in the Battle of Cable Street and other attacks on Oswald Mosley's Blackshirts. His only prison sentence in his career came in 1937 as a result of causing grieveous bodily harm to a Blackshirt. Jack served six months. In the post-war era, Comer is said to have been involved in funding the 43 Group, a group of Jewish ex-servicemen and women who took direct action to violently oppose and disrupt the actions of the fascist Union Movement and other far-right and extreme-right groups.

== Rise to the top ==
Rapidly becoming a powerful force in the East End, and having built a reputation running "muscle" in Leeds, Birmingham and other northern nightclubs, Comer and his gang began to violently take control of racecourses across Britain. After wresting the courses from many other gangs across the country, the money from racecourses abruptly ceased as they closed with the outbreak of war. A wartime effort to crack down on illegal gambling clubs led to Jack and several companions being rounded up and then conscripted into the army. Jack did not fit the life of army discipline. His discharge was formally for 'mental instability,' but in fact he had beaten an antisemitic superior officer, and continued to make himself a nuisance until he was released. Comer returned to London to expand his control. Spreading his influence outside of the East End into the West End, Comer made huge profits from running drinking clubs and gaming rooms, as well as taking "protection" money from businesses across the capital. Although his rise to the top was violent, Comer's real skill was bringing together criminals of different capabilities for "jobs". Muscle, burglars, safe crackers, forgers, fences, hijackers and thieves were brought together to suit the job at hand. On top of this, there were MPs and police on his payroll and, at his strongest, up to a thousand men on call to face any threat to his empire. It was organised crime in a way that had not been seen in London before. Under Comer's leadership criminals such as Billy Hill, the Kray twins and Freddie Forman were able to rise in London's underworld.

== Decline and later years ==
From the mid-1950s, after over a decade at the top of London's underworld, Comer's control of the East and West End was challenged. Billy Hill was a talented and smart thief who had written to Comer asking to work for him whilst Hill was serving time. Comer took a shine to Hill and on his release from prison Hill was picked up, taken to Savile Row for a suit and then on to meet Comer. Recognising Hill's talent for crime, Comer took him under his wing and gave Hill a few spielers (gambling clubs) to run. Eventually, when Hill had amassed enough money and clout he made his move against his mentor.

Trouble with the law and a systematic attack on his sources of income by Hill and others led to Comer being squeezed out. In 1954, after Sunday People crime journalist Duncan Webb published derogatory articles about him at the behest of Billy Hill, Comer attacked Webb. He was accused of possession of a knuckle-duster, convicted of grievous bodily harm, and fined £50. Although a small fine for Comer, the court case took over a lot of his time. In 1955 he was arrested following a knife fight with Albert Dimes, who had refused to pay protection money. Comer was cleared of a charge of stabbing; he said it was because of "the greatest lawyer in history", his barrister Rose Heilbron.

In 1956, Comer and his wife were ambushed and viciously attacked by a group of eight men armed with clubs and knives about 100 yards outside their Paddington flat. Two of the attackers, "Mad" Frankie Fraser and Bobby Warren, were each sentenced to seven years in prison. Whilst Comer was recovering from his injuries, his enemies "grassed him up" to the police for attacking and cutting a petty criminal, Tommy Falco. In all probability the wound had been inflicted by Falco himself or others to frame Comer. While Comer was imprisoned awaiting trial, Billy Hill was able to take over Comer's West End interests, and Comer decided to retire from organised crime.

During the next few decades, the former "King of the Underworld" was often seen at boxing matches, and undertook various jobs over the years, including being an antique furniture dealer. He died in Isleworth aged 83; his ashes were spread in Israel.

== In popular culture ==
Comer is a major character in the 2019 film Once Upon a Time in London.

Comer is mentioned in the 1985 song "Ghosts of Cable Street" by The Men They Couldn't Hang, where he is referred to as "Jack Spot".

Comer is an important secondary character in the 2024 novel The Great When by Alan Moore, mostly as "Jack Spot".
