= Lists of British people =

Lists of British peoples cover people from the United Kingdom of Great Britain and Northern Ireland. The list are organized by region, by religion, by country of origin and by occupation.

== By region ==
- List of English people
- List of Welsh people
- List of Scots
- List of people from Northern Ireland

=== Crown Dependencies ===
- List of Manx people
- List of people from Guernsey
- List of people from Jersey

== By religion ==
- List of British Buddhists
- List of British Muslims
- List of British Jews

== By country of origin ==
- Lists of British people by ethnic or national origin
- Europe
  - French
  - Dutch
  - German
  - Greek
  - Irish
  - Italian
  - Nordic
  - Portuguese
  - Spanish
  - Turkish
- West Asia
  - Azerbaijani
  - Iranian
  - Iraqi
  - Jewish
- South Asia
  - Bangladeshi
  - Indian
  - Pakistani
  - Sri Lankan
- Africa
  - Ghanaian
  - Nigerian
  - Somali
  - Zimbabwean
- Caribbean
  - Barbadian
  - Guyanese
  - Jamaican
  - Trinidadian
- East Asia
  - East Asian
  - Chinese
  - Japanese
- Latin America
  - Latin American
  - Brazilian
  - Mexican

== By occupation ==
- List of British actors
- List of British architects
- List of British artists
- List of British painters
- List of British philosophers
- List of British investors

== By ethnic or national origin ==
- List of European Britons
  - List of Cypriot Britons
  - List of Dutch Britons
  - List of German Britons
  - List of Greek Britons
  - List of Italian Britons
  - List of Spanish Britons
- List of Black Britons
  - List of Barbadian Britons
  - List of Ghanaian Britons
  - List of Guyanese Britons
  - List of Jamaican Britons
  - List of Nigerian Britons
  - List of Trinidadian Britons
- List of South Asian Britons
  - List of Bangladeshi Britons
  - List of Indian Britons
  - List of Sikh Britons
  - List of Pakistani Britons
  - List of Punjabi Britons
  - List of Sri Lankan Britons
- List of Other Asian Britons
  - List of British Azerbaijanis
  - List of Chinese Britons
  - List of Filipino Britons
  - List of Iranian Britons
  - List of Iraqi Britons
  - List of Turkish Britons
  - List of British Vietnamese
- List of Latin Americans in the United Kingdom
  - List of Brazilian Britons
  - List of Mexican Britons

== See also ==
- Lists of people by nationality
