= List of Barbadian Britons =

This is a list of notable Barbadian British people (i.e. Barbadian immigrants to the UK and British-born individuals of Barbadian ethnic or national origin).

- Aziya, singer-songwriter and guitarist
- Nigel Benn, former boxer
- Malorie Blackman, children's writer
- Dennis Bovell, reggae musician and producer
- Peter Brathwaite, baritone opera singer, mother born in Barbados.
- Ashley Cole, England international footballer, Bajan father
- Carl Cox, techno DJ, born in Barbados
- Des'ree, singer, Bajan father
- Digga D, rapper
- Livvi Franc, singer-songwriter
- Fredo, rapper
- Kieran Gibbs, England and Arsenal F.C. footballer, Bajan father
- David Harewood, actor
- Guy Hewitt, High Commissioner 2014-2018 and Activist for the Windrush Generation
- Chris Jordan, cricketer
- Jofra Archer, cricketer
- Shaznay Lewis, singer-songwriter, member of All Saints, Bajan father
- Mark Morrison, singer
- Sarah Niles, actress
- Redd Pepper, voice actor
- Nevada Phillips, cricketer
- Leigh-Anne Pinnock, member of British girl group Little Mix
- Oliver Skeete, showjumper, born in Speightstown
- Moira Stuart, newsreader and broadcaster, Bajan father
- Sir Michael Stoute, thoroughbred horse trainer, born in St. Michael's Parish
- Swarmz, rapper
- Walter Tull, footballer and British army officer, his father Daniel Tull was born in Barbados
- Alison Hinds, popular female Barbadian Soca singer, (born in England to Barbadian parents)
- Gary Younge, journalist, author and broadcaster
- Benjamin Zephaniah, writer and poet, Bajan father
- La'Vere Corbin-Ong, footballer (Barbadian) father)
- Rhian Brewster, footballer (Barbadian) father)
- Sikisa, comedian
- Nathan Stewart-Jarrett, actor

== See also ==
- Barbadian British
- List of Barbadians
- List of Barbadian Americans
- Barbadian Canadians
