= List of Eastern Caribbean people =

Listed below are prominent people from the Eastern Caribbean and the Guianas. Because of the close proximity of these countries, some people are listed under more than one heading. The following are not included: Bahamians, Belizeans, Cubans, Dominicans (from the Dominican Republic), Haitians, Jamaicans, or Puerto Ricans.

== Antigua and Barbuda ==
- List of Antiguans and Barbudans
  - List of ambassadors of Antigua and Barbuda to China
  - List of ambassadors of Antigua and Barbuda to the United States
  - List of flag bearers for Antigua and Barbuda at the Olympics
  - List of High Commissioner for Antigua and Barbuda to the United Kingdom

== Barbados ==
- List of Barbadian people

== Curaçao ==
- List of Curaçaoans
  - List of Curaçaoan records in athletics

== Dominica ==
- List of people from Dominica
- List of Dominican Americans
- List of heads of government of Dominica
  - List of colonial governors and administrators of Dominica
  - List of presidents of Dominica
  - List of members of the House of Assembly of Dominica
  - List of ambassadors of Dominica to China
  - List of ambassadors of Dominica to the United States
- List of Dominica writers

== French Guiana ==
- List of French Guianans
- List of colonial and departmental heads of French Guiana

== Grenada ==
- List of Grenadians
  - List of heads of state of Grenada
  - List of Grenadian writers

== Guadeloupe ==
=== Athletes ===
- Jocelyn Angloma (born 1965), French football manager and player born in Guadeloupe.
- Luther Archimède (born 1999), Guadeloupean footballer.
- Taïryk Arconte (born 2003), Guadeloupean footballer.
- Christine Arron (born 1973), Guadeloupean sprinter.
- Stéphane Auvray (born 1981), Guadeloupean football manager.
- Juhann Begarin (born 2002), basketball player born in Guadeloupe.
- Jeanuël Belocian (born 2005), footballer born in Guadeloupe.
- Wilhem Belocian (born 1995), hurdler and sprinter from Guadeloupe.
- Jannela Blonbou (born 1998), French handballer born in Guadeloupe.
- Pascal Chimbonda (born 1979), footballer born in Guadeloupe.
- Marcus Coco (born 1996), footballer from Guadeloupe.
- Miguel Comminges (born 1982), footballer from Guadeloupe.
- Wylan Cyprien (born 1995), footballer born in Guadeloupe.
- Fritz Emeran (born 1976), footballer born in Guadeloupe.
- Laura Flessel-Colovic (born 1971), fencing champion and Olympic medalist from Guadeloupe.
- Julie Foggea (born 1990), handballer from Guadeloupe.
- William Gallas (born 1977), footballer who has played for Guadeloupe.
- Jonathan Jeanne (born 1997), Guadeloupean basketballer.
- Laura Kanor (born 1997), handballer from Guadeloupe.
- Orlane Kanor (born 1997), handballer from Guadeloupe.
- Adrianna Lamalle (born 1982), hurdler from Guadeloupe.
- Thomas Lemar (born 1995), Guadeloupean footballer.
- Laïsa Lerus (born 1975), Guadeloupean handballer.
- Méddy Lina (born 1986), Guadeloupean footballer.
- David Michineau (born 1994), Guadeloupean basketballer.
- Zoran Moco (born 2003), Guadeloupean footballer.
- Jérôme Moïso (born 1978), basketballer who grew up in Guadeloupe.
- Jean-Marc Mormeck
- Marie-José Pérec
- Mickaël Piétrus
- Therry Racon
- Teddy Riner
- Louis Saha
- Kevin Seraphin
- Jordan Tell
- Lilian Thuram
- Marius Trésor
- Ronald Zubar

=== Filmmakers ===
- Sarah Maldoror

=== Political leaders ===
- Louis Delgrès
- Victor Hugues
- Victorin Lurel
- Stéphane Pocrain
- Patrick Reason

=== Religious leaders ===
- Jean Baptiste Labat

=== Writers and intellectuals ===
- Maryse Condé
- Daniel Maximin
- Saint-John Perse
- Simone Schwarz-Bart

== Guyana ==
- List of Guyanese British people

=== Political leaders ===
- Brindley Benn
- Forbes Burnham
- Arthur Chung
- Clinton Collymore
- Hubert Nathaniel Critchlow
- Cuffy
- Jack Gladstone
- Quamina Gladstone
- David A. Granger
- Bernie Grant
- Sam Hinds
- Desmond Hoyte
- Cheddi Jagan
- Janet Jagan
- Bharrat Jagdeo
- Eusi Kwayana
- Moses Nagamootoo
- Reepu Daman Persaud
- Sir Shridath Ramphal
- Clement Rohee
- Rupert Roopnaraine
- Merlin Udho

== Martinique ==
=== Athletes ===
- Claude Anelka
- Nicolas Anelka
- Garry Bocaly
- Manuel Cabit
- Mikaël Cantave
- Joan Hartock
- Steeven Langil
- Peter Luccin
- Johnny Marajo
- Steve Marlet
- Ronny Turiaf

=== Filmmakers ===
- Euzhan Palcy

=== Political leaders ===
- Joséphine de Beauharnais
- Alfred Marie-Jeanne
- Julien Fédon, slave revolt leader

=== Writers and intellectuals ===
- Aimé Césaire
- Patrick Chamoiseau
- Raphaël Confiant
- Frantz Fanon
- Édouard Glissant
- Suzanne Lacascade
- René Maran
- Jeanne Nardal
- Paulette Nardal
- Joseph Zobel

== Saint Kitts and Nevis ==
- List of British people of Saint Kitts and Nevis descent

=== Sports Personalities ===
- Keith Arthurton
- Kim Collins
- Derick Parry
- Elquemedo Willett
- Stuart Williams

=== Soccer ===
- Marcus Rashford

=== Business and agriculture ===
- James Baillie

=== Political leaders ===
- Sir Clement Arrindell
- Robert Bradshaw
- Nerys Dockery
- Denzil Douglas
- Alexander Hamilton
- Timothy Harris
- Rawlins Lowndes
- Sir Lee Moore
- Sir Cuthbert Sebastian
- Sir Kennedy Simmonds
- Paul Southwell
- Mutryce Williams

=== Writers, intellectuals, filmmakers, and artists ===
- Joan Armatrading
- Imruh Bakari
- Christene Browne
- Burt Caesar
- Pogus Caesar
- Caryl Phillips
- Cicely Tyson

== Saint Lucia ==
- See also List of Saint Lucians
- List of British people of Saint Lucian descent

=== Actors ===
- Marianne Jean-Baptiste
- Joseph Marcell

=== Artists ===
- Winston Branch
- Dunstan St. Omer
- Llewellyn Xavier

=== Athletes ===
- Ken Charlery (St Lucian parents)
- Jermain Defoe (St Lucian mother)
- Anton Ferdinand (St Lucian father)
- Les Ferdinand
- Rio Ferdinand (St Lucian father)
- Dominic Johnson
- Cyrille Regis
- Dave Regis
- John Regis
- Darren Sammy

=== Economists ===
- Sir Arthur Lewis

=== Musicians ===
- Shola Ama
- Nicole David
- Ronald "Boo" Hinkson
- Joey Badass
- Trevor Nelson

=== Political leaders ===
- Kenny Anthony
- Winston Cenac
- George Charles
- Sir John Compton
- Julian Hunte
- Sir Allen Lewis
- Vaughan Lewis
- Sir Allan Louisy
- Dame Pearlette Louisy
- George Odlum
- Berthia Monica Parle
- Philip J. Pierre

=== Writers and intellectuals ===
- Derek Walcott

== Saint Vincent and the Grenadines ==
=== Athletes ===
- Adonal Foyle
- Dan Gadzuric
- Jesse Lingard
- Sancho Lyttle
- Nafesha Richardson
- Sophia Young

=== Musicians ===
- Kevin Lyttle
- Mattafix

=== Political leaders ===
- Sir Charles Antrobus
- Sir Frederick Ballantyne
- Milton Cato
- Joseph Chatoyer
- Arnhim Eustace
- Ralph Gonsalves
- Sir David Jack
- Ebenezer Joshua
- Sir James F. Mitchell
- Sir Louis Straker

== Suriname ==
=== Athletes ===
- Donyell Malen
- Dwight Tiendalli
- Florian Jozefzoon
- Tommy Asinga
- Ryan Babel
- Remy Bonjasky
- Edgar Davids
- Eljero Elia
- Ilonka Elmont
- Ruud Gullit
- Ernesto Hoost
- Patrick Kluivert
- Anthony Nesty
- Frank Rijkaard
- Clarence Seedorf
- Tyrone Spong
- Letitia Vriesde
- Aron Winter
- Jimmy Floyd Hasselbaink
- Kevin Wattamaleo
- Kurt Elshot
- Sigourney Bandjar
- Romario Sabajo

=== Inventors ===
- Jan Earnst Matzeliger

=== Political leaders ===
- Jules Ajodhia
- Henck Arron
- Bram Behr
- Dési Bouterse
- Ronnie Brunswijk
- Johan Ferrier
- Otto Huiswoud
- Harry Kisoensingh
- Jagernath Lachmon
- Pretaapnarian Radhakishun
- Ram Sardjoe
- Ronald Venetiaan
- Jules Wijdenbosch

=== Writers and intellectuals ===
- Aphra Behn
- Anton de Kom
- Lou Lichtveld

=== Musicians ===
- Ruth Jacott
- Tony Scott
- Ramdew Chaitoe
- Dropati
- Natalie La Rose
- Eva Simons

== Trinidad and Tobago ==
- List of Trinidadian Britons

=== Artists ===
- Isaiah James Boodhoo
- Michel-Jean Cazabon
- Boscoe Holder
- Geoffrey Holder
- Che Lovelace
- Zak Ové

=== Athletes ===
- Carlos Edwards
- Inshan Ali
- Stephen Ames
- Marvin Andrews
- Ian Bishop
- Marlon Black
- Ato Boldon
- George Bovell III
- Dwayne Bravo
- Darrel Brown
- Marc Burns
- Learie Constantine
- Hasely Crawford
- Rajindra Dhanraj
- Mervyn Dillon
- Ansil Elcock
- Daren Ganga
- Roger Gibbon
- Hilary Angelo "Larry" Gomes
- Gerald "Gerry" Gomez
- Anthony Gray
- Shaka Hislop
- Clayton Ince
- Stern John
- Kenwyne Jones
- Brian Lara
- Russell Latapy
- Leonson Lewis
- Augustine "Gus" Logie
- Clint Marcelle
- Wendell Mottley
- Deryck Murray
- Jerren Nixon
- Sonny Ramadhin
- Manny Ramjohn
- Dinanath Ramnarine
- Anthony Rougier
- Phil Simmons
- Jeffrey Stollmeyer
- Victor Stollmeyer
- Richard Thompson
- Evans Wise
- Dwight Yorke
- Levi García

=== Dancers ===
- Pearl Primus

=== Filmmakers ===
- Horace Ové
- Frances-Anne Solomon

=== Musicians ===
- Attila the Hun (Raymond Quevado) – calypsonian
- Winifred Atwell
- Denise "Saucy Wow" Belfon
- Inga "Foxy Brown" Marchand
- Chalkdust (Hollis Liverpool)
- Ken Marlon Charles (KMC)
- Maximus Dan
- Destra Garcia
- Bunji Garlin
- Haddaway
- Heather Headley
- Raymond Holman
- Lord Invader
- Lord Kitchener (Alwyn Roberts)
- Lord Melody
- Fay Ann Lyons-Alvarez
- Mighty Sparrow (Slinger Francisco)
- Mighty Spoiler
- Nicki Minaj (Onika Tanya Maraj-Petty) – rapper
- PartyNextDoor (Trinidadian father)
- Cardi B (Belcalis Marlenis Almánzar) (Trinidadian mother)
- Lennox "Bobby" Mohammed
- Machel Montano
- Billy Ocean
- Denyse Plummer
- Sundar Popo
- Patrice Roberts
- David Rudder
- Adesh Samaroo
- Jit Samaroo
- Hazel Scott
- Len "Boogsie" Sharpe
- Lord Shorty/Ras Shorty I (Garfield Blackman)
- Black Stalin (Leroy Calliste)
- André Tanker
- Rakesh Yankaran

=== Political leaders ===
- Tubal Uriah Butler
- Rudranath Capildeo
- Simbhoonath Capildeo
- Stokely Carmichael (a.k.a. Kwame Ture)
- George Chambers
- Carson Charles
- Arthur Andrew Cipriani (A. A. Cipriani)
- Sir Ellis Clarke
- Tracy Davidson-Celestine
- Winston Dookeran
- Knowlson Gift
- Albert Gomes
- Geddes Granger (Makandal Daaga)
- Gary Griffith
- Noor Hassanali
- Karl Hudson-Phillips
- A. P. T. James
- Roy Joseph
- Franklin Khan
- Fuad Khan
- Gillian Lucky
- Ramesh Maharaj
- Patrick Manning
- Bhadase Sagan Maraj
- Ralph Maraj
- Wendell Mottley
- Folade Mutota
- George Padmore
- Basdeo Panday
- Kamla Persad-Bissessar
- David Pitt, Baron Pitt of Hampstead
- George Maxwell Richards
- Adrian Cola Rienzi (born Krishna Deonarine)
- A. N. R. Robinson
- Keith Rowley
- Austin "Jack" Warner
- Dr. Eric Williams
- Eric A. Williams
- Gerald Yetming

=== Writers and intellectuals ===
- Lloyd Best
- Neil Bissoondath
- Ralph de Boissière
- Dionne Brand
- Vahni Capildeo
- Stokely Carmichael
- Rosa Guy
- Merle Hodge
- C. L. R. James
- Earl Lovelace
- Mustapha Matura
- Shiva Naipaul
- V. S. Naipaul
- Lakshmi Persaud
- Kenneth Ramchand
- Arnold Rampersad
- Lall Sawh
- Samuel Selvon
- Eric Williams

== Virgin Islands ==
=== United States Virgin Islands ===
- List of people from the United States Virgin Islands
  - List of governors of the United States Virgin Islands
  - List of United States Virgin Islands senators
  - List of United States Virgin Islands suffragists

=== Artists and architects ===
- Dr. William Thornton

=== Athletes ===
- Trent Alexander-Arnold

=== Doctors and scientists ===
- Dr John C. Lettsom
- Morris Simmonds

=== Musicians ===
- Iyaz
- Melanie Amaro

=== Writers and intellectuals ===
- Arthur Schomburg

== See also ==
- Lists of people by nationality
