= List of Barbadian Americans =

This is a list of notable Barbadian Americans, including both original immigrants who obtained American citizenship and their American descendants.

== Actors ==
- Meagan Good - actress (paternal grandfather)
- Cuba Gooding, Jr. – actor (paternal grandfather was from Barbados)
- Omar Gooding – actor (same grandfather as Cuba Jr.)
- Chet Hanks – actor (ancestry vague)
- Colin Hanks – actor (ancestry vague)
- Jim Hanks – actor (ancestry vague)
- Tom Hanks – actor (ancestry vague)
- Adrian Holmes – Canadian actor (ancestry vague)
- Mari Morrow – actress (ancestry vague)
- Gwyneth Paltrow – (her great-grandmother was Barbadian)
- Redd Pepper – (born Richard Green in Barbados)
- Robert Christopher Riley – actor (father from Barbados)
- Lamman Rucker – (ancestry vague)

== Entertainers ==
- Lene Hall – supermodel
- Norma Miller – dancer (both parents from Barbados)
- Walter Weekes, also known as FreshPrinceCEO, co-host of the Fresh and Fit Podcast

== Musicians ==
- Anycia - rapper
- A$AP Rocky - real name Rakim Mayers, rapper
- KRS-One – real name Lawrence Parker, rapper
- Afrika Bambaataa – musician
- Damon Dash - co-founder of Roc-A-Fella Records; Stacey Dash's cousin
- Grandmaster Flash – hip hop musician and DJ
- Dave East – rapper
- Doug E. Fresh – hip hop musician
- Desiigner – hip hop musician/rapper
- Cuba Gooding, Sr. – singer
- Ryan Leslie – musician, producer
- Mr. Lif – hip hop musician
- Lord Burgess – songwriter
- Shontelle – musician
- Arturo Tappin – musician
- Charlene Keys- singer
- Rayvon – real name Bruce Alexander Michael Brewster, Barbadian singer-songwriter
- Remy Ma – rapper
- Rowdy Rebel – rapper

== Public service figures ==
- Shirley Chisholm - Congresswoman
- Adrian Fenty – former Mayor of Washington, District of Columbia
- Charles Gittens – first black United States Secret Service agent
- Sylvia O. Hinds-Radix – New York State Supreme Court Judge
- Eric Holder – former Attorney General of the United States
- Sherrilyn Ifill – lawyer and activist
- Thomas Jones – former Civil Court judge and civil rights activist in Brooklyn, New York
- Chirlane McCray – poet, public speech writer, married to New York City Mayor, Bill de Blasio
- Bret Schundler – former Mayor of Jersey City, NJ
- Lloyd Sealy – first African American NYPD officer to command a police precinct and patrol borough
- Dennis M. Walcott – Deputy Mayor for Education and Community Development in New York City

== Religious figures ==
- Arnold Josiah Ford – rabbi

== Scientists ==
- Cardinal Warde – physicist, full professor of Electrical Engineering and Computer Science at the Massachusetts Institute of Technology

== Sports figures ==
- Robert Bailey - National Football League player
- Anson Carter – Canadian hockey player
- Rajah Caruth – American NASCAR driver
- Andre De Grasse – Canadian Sprinter
- Mike Grier – NHL General Manager (and former player)
- Ramon Harewood – National Football League player
- Orlando Jordan – professional wrestler
- Winston Justice – National Football League player
- Sam Seale – National Football League player
- Alana Shipp – American/Israeli IFBB professional bodybuilder
- Christian Taylor – track and field athlete
- Obadele Thompson – track and field athlete
- Kevin Weekes – Canadian hockey player
- Andrew Wiggins – Canadian basketball player
- Nick Wiggins – Canadian basketball player
- Zane Maloney – Formula 2 and Formula E driver
- Obi Toppin - American basketball player

== Writers ==
- Gwen Ifill (1955–2016) American journalist and television newscaster
- Agymah Kamau – novelist
- Odimumba Kwamdela (1942–2019) poet and novelist
- Paule Marshall (1929–2019) novelist
- Susan L. Taylor (born 1946) editor-in-chief of Essence magazine
- Neville Goddard – writer and mystic
- Audre Lorde - writer

== Others ==
- Percy C. Ifill (1913–1973) American architect of Barbadian descent
- Frank L. White (1867–1938) chef, the original chef's face on Cream of Wheat box

== See also ==
- List of Barbadians
- List of Barbadian Britons
- Barbadian Canadians
