= List of British Italians =

This is a list of notable British people of Italian ancestry and of Italians established in the UK. The citizenship and connection to the United Kingdom and Italy is shown in parentheses.

== Administration ==
=== Prime ministers ===
- Benjamin Disraeli

=== Secretaries of state and ministers ===
- A. J. Mundella
- John Profumo
- John Sperni Mayor of St Pancras, 1937-1938

== Arts ==
=== Cartoonists ===
- Edward Ardizzone
- Barry Fantoni
- Carlo Pellegrini (caricaturist)

=== Circus performers ===
- Emilia Arata
- Charlie Cairoli
- Joseph Grimaldi

=== Composers ===
- Muzio Clementi
- Maria Cosway
- Gerald Finzi
- Felice Giardini
- Remo Lauricella
- John Marcangelo

=== Designers ===
- John Amabile
- Antonio Berardi
- Benedetta Dubini
- John Galliano
- Bianca Mosca

=== Education ===
- Anna Hassan

=== Film directors ===
- Ginevra Elkann
- Elliott Hasler
- Kim Longinotto

=== Hairdressers ===
- Lino Carbosiero
- Anthony Mascolo

=== Librarians ===
- Anthony Panizzi

=== Literature ===
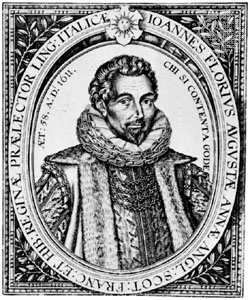
Giovanni Florio, 1611; engraving by William Hole from the 2nd edition of Florio's dictionary

- John Florio (1553–1625), known in Italian as Giovanni Florio; linguist and lexicographer of Anglo-Italian origin; referred to himself as 'an Englishman in Italiano'; royal language tutor at the Court of James I; a friend with huge influence on William Shakespeare
- Michelangelo Florio (1515–1572), Italian humanist; Franciscan friar before converting to Protestantism; pastor in England and Switzerland; father of the renaissance polymath John Florio

=== Musicians ===
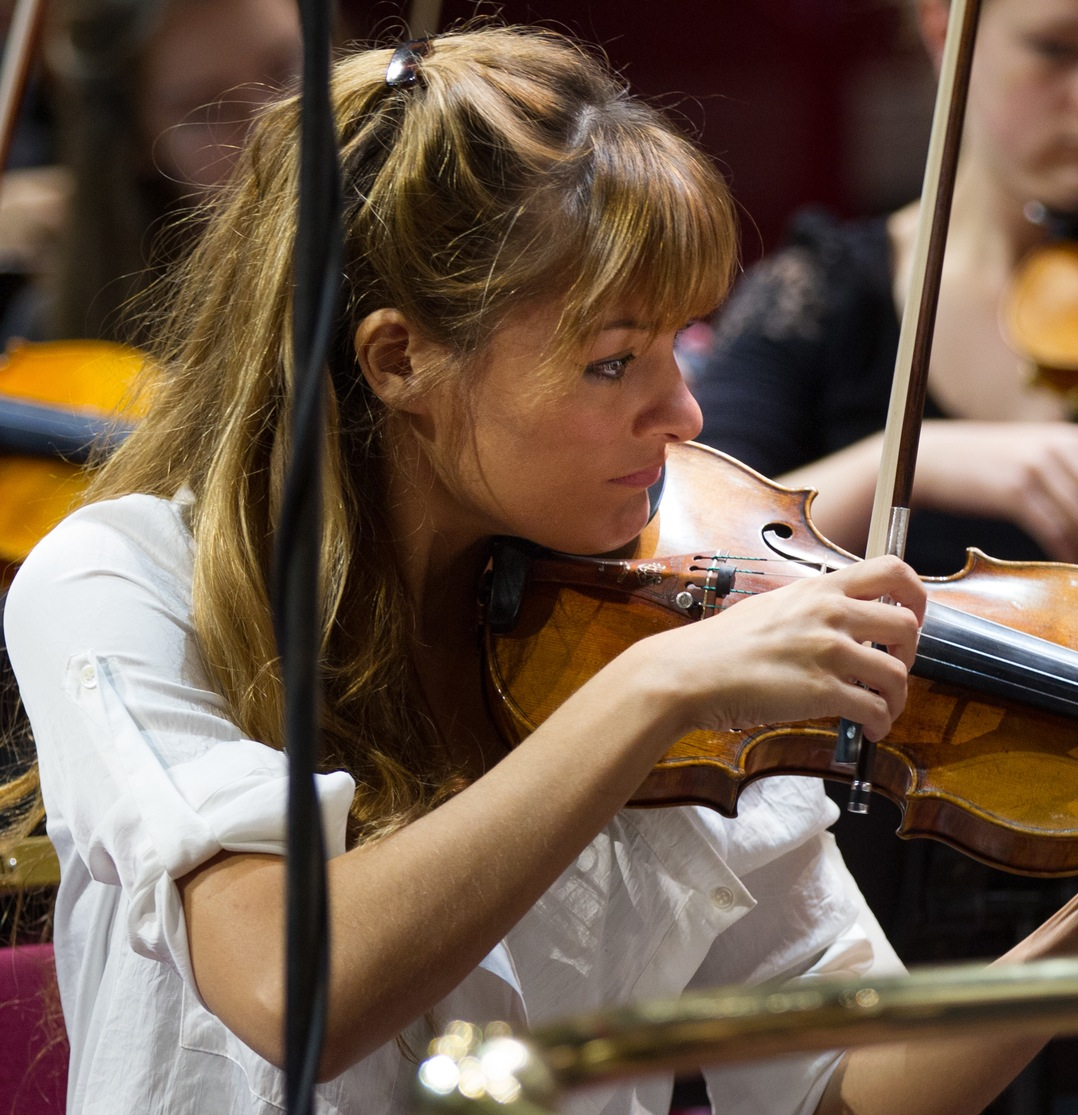
Musician Nicola Benedetti, MBE playing at Albert Hall

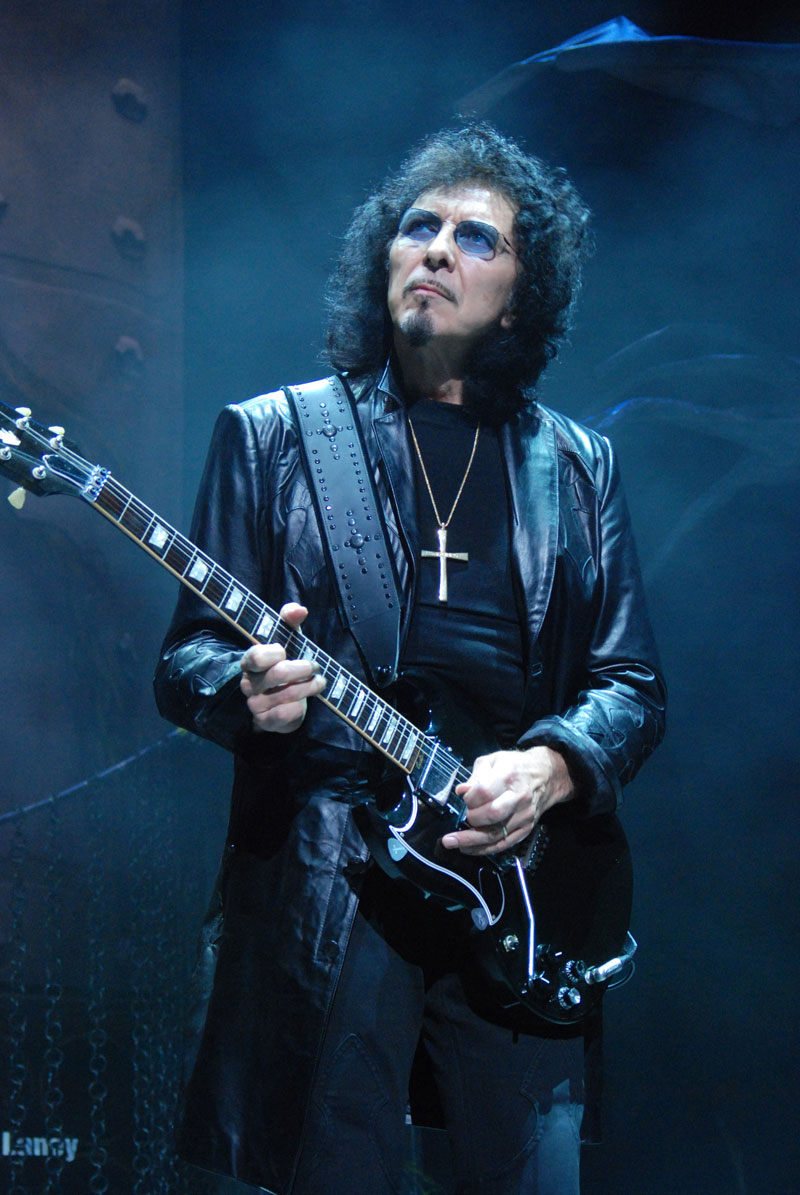
Tony Iommi, guitarist of heavy metal band Black Sabbath, is of Italian descent

- Perry Bamonte
- Richard Barbieri
- John Barbirolli
- Anthony Bassano
- Nicola Benedetti
- Blossom Caldarone
- Anna Calvi
- Junior Campbell
- Jim Capaldi
- Paul Coletti
- Maria Cosway
- Ambrose Coviello
- Robert Del Naja
- Mike Di Scala
- Sophia Dussek
- Nic Fanciulli
- Lita Ford
- Felice Giardini
- John Gregory
- Tony Iommi
- Brian Johnson
- Remo Lauricella
- Matt Maltese
- Nicolas Mori
- Vincent Novello
- Paolo Nutini
- Fabiana Palladino
- Pino Palladino
- Antonio Pappano
- Anthony Pini
- Sergio Pizzorno
- Andrea Prodan
- Chris Rea
- Andrew Ridgely
- Atticus Ross
- Liberty Ross
- Francis Rossi
- Semprini
- Sick Luke

=== Painters ===
- Estella Canziani
- Giovanni Battista Cipriani
- Emilio Coia
- Maria Cosway
- John Marcangelo
- Anna Mazzotta
- Alberto Morrocco
- Eduardo Paolozzi
- Carlo Pellegrini
- Jasmine Pradissitto
- Dante Gabriel Rossetti
- Alexander Rossi
- Jack Vettriano
- Andrew Vicari

=== Photographers ===
- Alexander Bassano
- Felice Beato
- Oscar Marzaroli
- Mario Testino
- Minnie Weisz

=== Poets ===
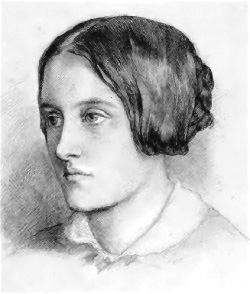
Poet Christina Rossetti

- Emilia Lanier
- Mario Petrucci
- Christina Rossetti
- Dante Gabriel Rossetti

=== Scriptwriters ===
- Emilia di Girolamo
- Dominic Minghella

=== Sculptors ===
- Eduardo Paolozzi

=== Singers ===
- Lewis Capaldi
- Paul Di'Anno
- Sophia Dussek
- Brian Johnson
- Leona Lewis
- Luciana
- Lisa Maffia
- Linda Martin
- Christina Novelli
- Paolo Nutini
- Julian Perretta
- Sergio Pizzorno
- Andrea Prodan
- Chris Rea
- Francis Rossi
- Jack Savoretti
- Sharleen Spiteri
- Lena Zavaroni
- Thaila Zucchi

==== Opera singers ====
- Louisa Bassano
- Domenico Crivelli
- Clara Novello
- Nancy Storace

=== Translators ===
- Dante Gabriel Rossetti

=== Writers ===
Debra D'Annunzio

- Harold Acton
- Jani Allan
- Serena Guen
- Isaac D'Israeli
- Armando Iannucci
- Anna Mazzola
- Nigel Pivaro
- John William Polidori
- David Profumo
- Christina Georgina Rossetti
- Dante Gabriel Rossetti
- Maria Francesca Rossetti
- William Michael Rossetti
- Rafael Sabatini
- Silvia Saunders
- Alexander Trocchi
- Giustiniana Wynne

== Crime ==
=== Fraudsters ===
- Giovanni di Stefano

=== Mobsters ===
- Messina Brothers
- Bert 'Battles' Rossi
- Charles 'Darby' Sabini
- Albert Dimes
- The Cortesi brothers
- Tony Mella 'The king of Soho' during the 1950s.

== Economics ==
=== Entrepreneurs ===
- Charles Forte, Italian emigré
- Alex Polizzi, hotelier

== Food and drink ==
=== Celebrity chefs ===
- Antonio Carluccio
- Gennaro Contaldo
- Gino D'Acampo
- Anna Del Conte
- Angela Hartnett
- Giorgio Locatelli
- Filippo Mazzei
- Marco Pierre White
- Aldo Zilli

=== Food writers ===
- Carla Capalbo

== Media and performing arts ==
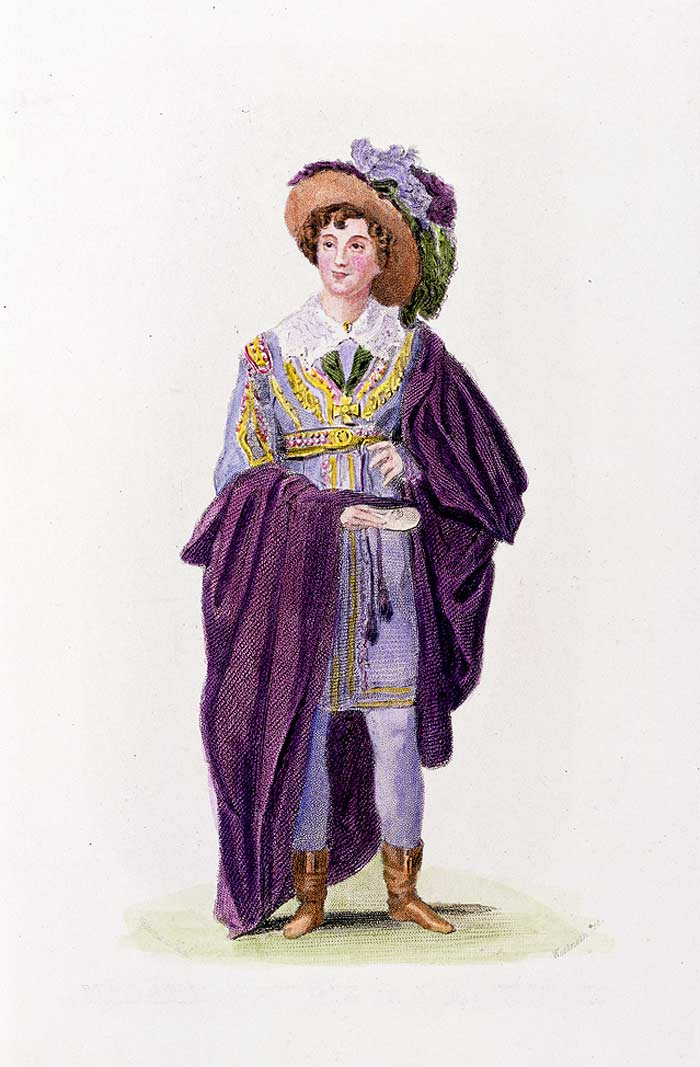
19th-century actress Lucia Elizabeth Vestris

=== Actors ===
- Philip Arditti
- Bruno Barnabe
- Peter Capaldi
- Hugh Carson
- Daniel Caltagirone
- Enzo Cilenti
- Jason Connery
- Tom Conti
- Michael Costa
- Sean Cronin
- Cameron Cuffe
- Timothy Dalton
- Fabien Frankel
- Michael Greco
- Jack Huston
- Lupino Lane
- Christopher Lee
- Ray Lovelock
- John Lynch
- Michael Malarkey
- Max Minghella
- Nico Mirallegro
- Alfred Molina
- Ruaridh Mollica
- Vincenzo Nicoli
- Sam Nivola
- Cliff Parisi
- Luke Pasqualino
- Adrian Paul
- Nigel Pivaro
- Robert Rietti
- George Rossi
- Carlo Rota
- Fabrizio Santino
- Victor Spinetti
- Enzo Squillino Jnr
- Ken Stott
- Mark Strong
- Joe Tracini

=== Actresses ===
- Ronni Ancona
- Hilda Anthony
- Greta Bellamacina
- Marina Berti
- Esmé Bianco
- Emily Bruni
- Eliza Butterworth
- Alessandra Celi
- Pearl Chanda
- Raffiella Chapman
- Flaminia Cinque
- Camille Coduri
- Nina Conti
- Frankie Corio
- Adrienne Corri
- Amy Di Bartolomeo
- Sophia Di Martino
- Paola Dionisotti
- Giovanna Fletcher
- Claire Forlani
- Anna Francolini
- Holliday Grainger
- Felicity Jones
- Marla Landi
- Louise Lombard
- Montserrat Lombard
- Cherie Lunghi
- Nathalie Lunghi
- Ida Lupino
- Linda Lusardi
- Susan Lynch
- Louisa Lytton
- Silvana Mangano
- Stefanie Martini
- Daniela Nardini
- Tamzin Outhwaite
- Isabella Pappas
- Gloria Paul
- Tanya Reynolds
- Liberty Ross
- Camilla and Rebecca Rosso
- Greta Scacchi
- Gia Scala
- Kaya Scodelario
- Sarah Seggari
- Ellora Torchia
- Indira Varma
- Lucia Elizabeth Vestris
- Rachel Weisz
- Thaila Zucchi

=== Comedians ===
- Ronni Ancona
- Nina Conti
- Armando Iannucci
- Joe Pasquale
- Victor Spinetti

=== Conductors ===
- John Barbirolli
- Mantovani
- Nicolas Mori
- Antonio Pappano

=== Dancers and choreographers ===
- Flavia Cacace
- Graziano Di Prima
- Giovanni Pernice
- Genesia Rosato
- Vincent Simone
- Bruno Tonioli

=== Directors ===
- Josh Appignanesi
- Peter Capaldi
- Peter Cattaneo
- Ida Lupino
- Anthony Minghella
- Carlo Gabriel Nero
- Annalisa Piras
- Franco Rosso

=== Journalists and broadcasters ===
Debra D'Annunio

- Luisa Baldini
- Katie Boyle
- Paul Coia
- Chris Crudelli
- Gino D'Acampo
- Romana D'Annunzio
- Nick Ferrari
- Paul Gambaccini
- Karin Giannone
- Lucrezia Millarini
- Thalia Pellegrini
- Marina Purkiss
- Carla Romano
- Ruth Sherlock
- Sophia Smith Galer
- Louis Theroux

=== TV personalities ===
- Mario Falcone
- Ricci Guarnaccio
- Katie Price
- Georgia Toffolo
- Paul Torrisi

=== Internet personalities ===
- Adam Pacitti
- Marzia Kjellberg
- PJ Liguori
- Claude Callegari
- Mark Goldbridge

== Military ==
=== Soldiers ===
- Dennis Donnini

== Nobility ==
=== People linked to royalty ===
- John Dalberg-Acton, 1st Baron Acton
- Peter II, Count of Savoy
- Philip Eyre Gell
- David Rizzio
- Mary of Modena
- Edoardo Mapelli Mozzi

== Politics and law ==
=== Civil servants ===
- John Salusbury Piozzi Salusbury

=== Legal professionals ===
- Joseph Beltrami
- Albert Profumo
- John Woodcock

=== Police ===
- Jerome Caminada

=== Politicians ===
- Tonia Antoniazzi
- David Bellotti
- Roger Casale
- Gloria de Piero
- Benjamin Disraeli
- Linda Fabiani
- Jack Lopresti
- Marco Longhi
- Ernesto Nathan
- James Tennant Molteno
- John Charles Molteno
- A. J. Mundella
- Manuela Perteghella
- John Profumo
- Carla Thorneycroft, Baroness Thorneycroft

== Religion ==
=== Ecclesial figures ===
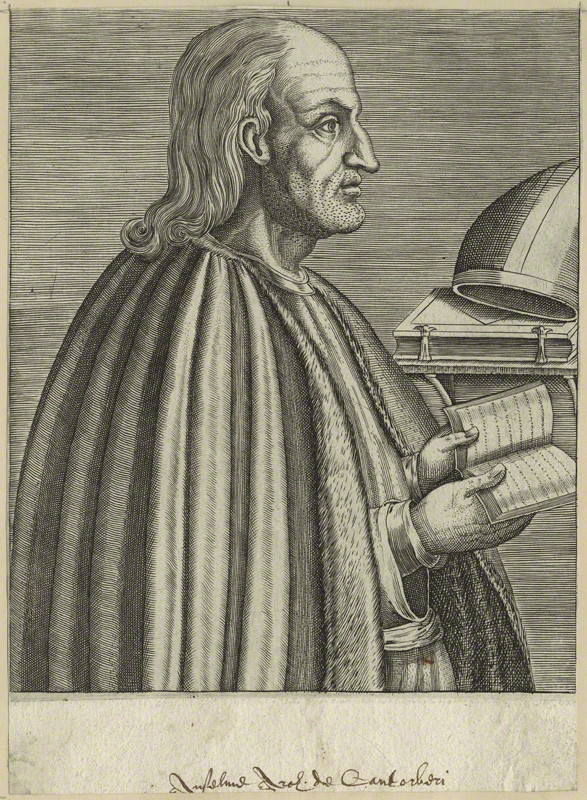
Anselm of Canterbury, important Christian thinker of 11th-century Europe

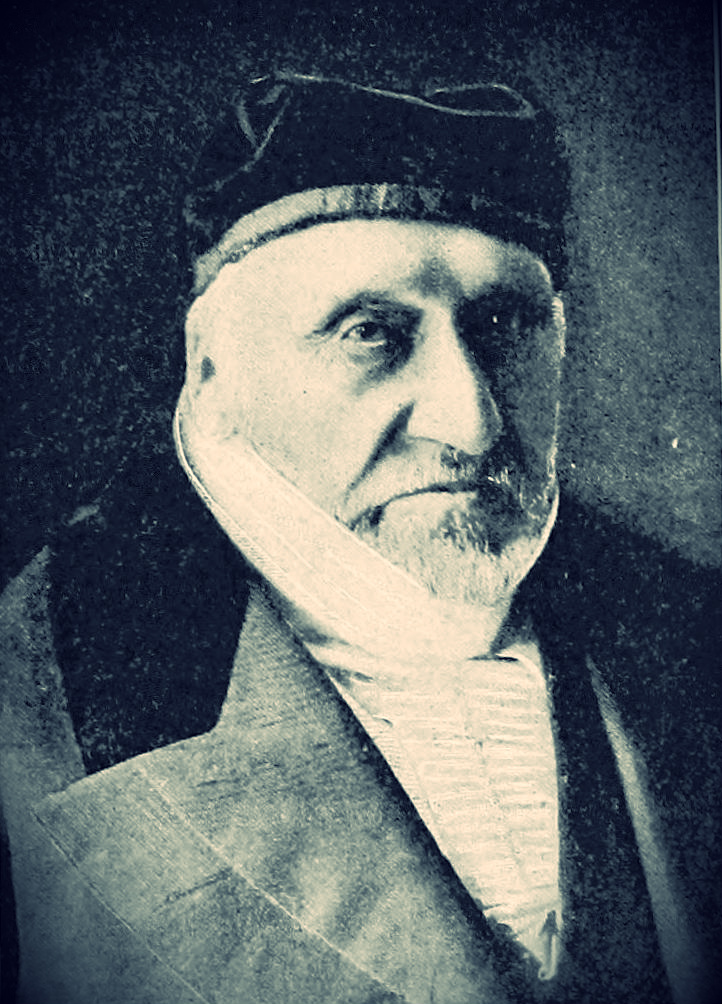
Moses Montefiore, one of the 19th century's most famous Jews

- Charles Januarius Acton
- Anselm of Canterbury
- Augustine of Canterbury
- John Marco Allegro
- Boniface of Savoy, Archbishop of Canterbury
- Mario Conti
- Moses Montefiore
- Philip Tartaglia

== Science and engineering ==
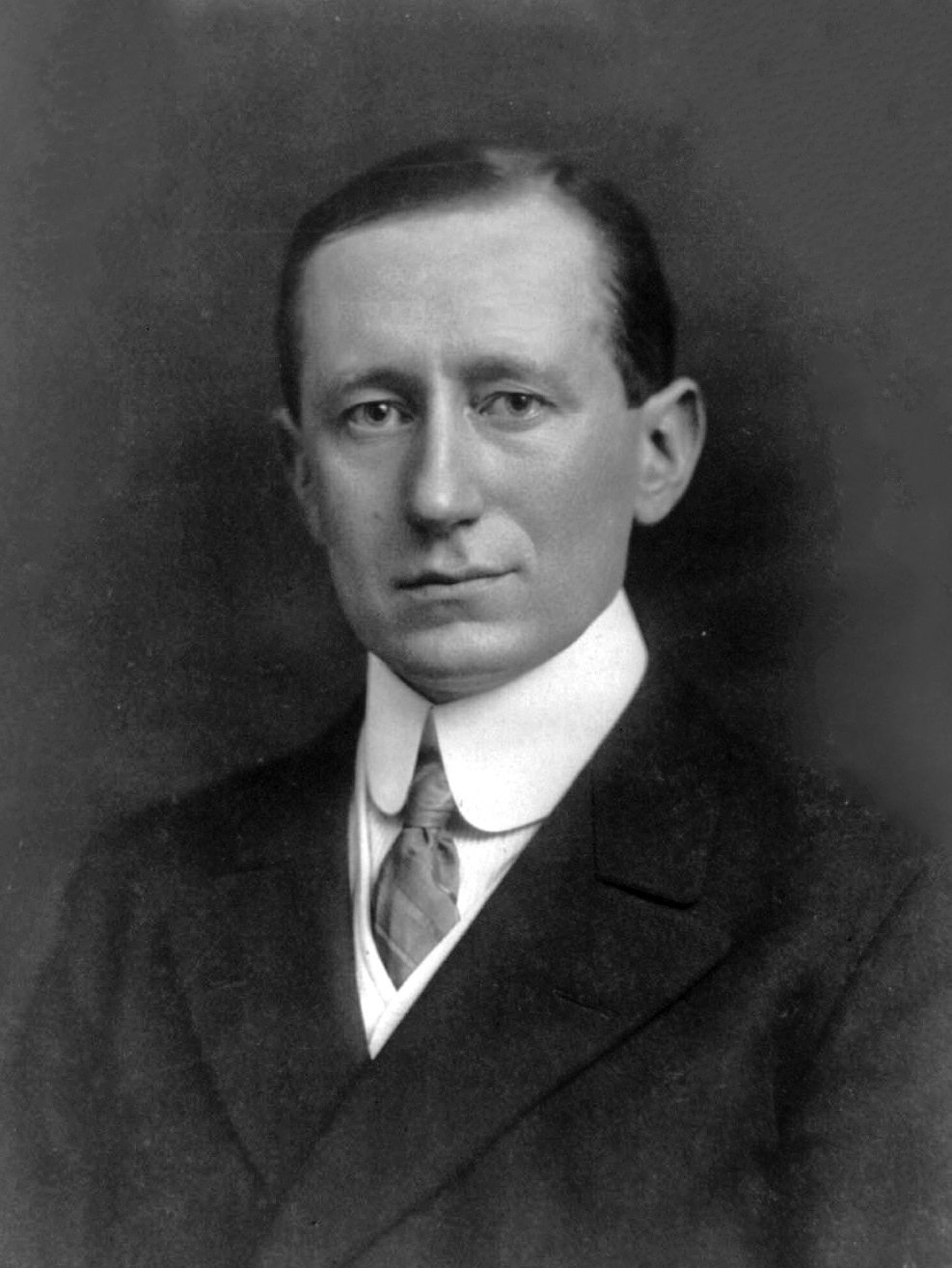
Engineer Guglielmo Marconi

=== Engineers ===
- Sebastian Ziani de Ferranti
- Guglielmo Marconi

=== Inventors ===
- James Chiosso
- Nick D'Aloisio
- Dino Dini
- Guglielmo Marconi

=== Scientists ===
- Henry Peter Bayon
- Nicole Soranzo
- Joseph Whitaker

== Sport ==
=== Athletics ===
- Toni Minichiello
- Andrew Pozzi

=== Basketballers ===
- Carlton Myers

=== Boxers ===
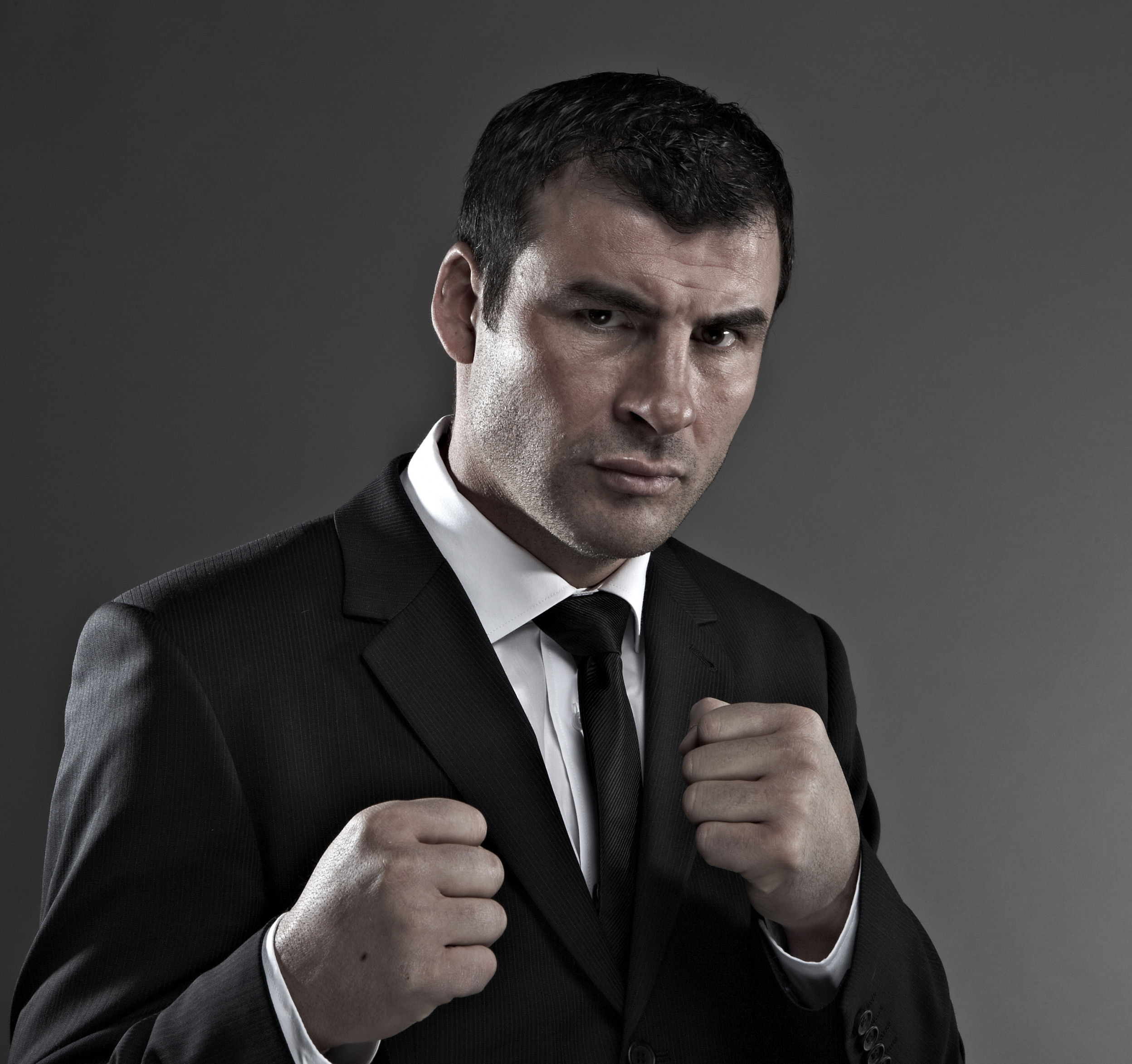
Undefeated super middleweight champion Joe Calzaghe

dominic Volante

- Frank Buglioni
- Enzo Calzaghe
- Joe Calzaghe
- Anthony Crolla
- Enzo Maccarinelli

=== Cricketers ===
- Damian Crowley
- Tony Palladino

=== Cyclists - road-racing ===
- Dario Cioni
- Max Sciandri

=== Divers ===
- Andrea Spendolini-Sirieix

=== Footballers ===
- Marco Adaggio
- Joe Bacuzzi
- Ryan Baldacchino
- Marcus Bettinelli
- Peter Bonetti
- Martin Buglione
- Danny Cadamarteri
- Alex Campana
- John Capaldi
- Tony Capaldi
- Tony Cascarino
- Mike Cecere
- Mark DeBolla
- Danny Dichio
- Tony Dorigo
- Mark Falco
- Joe Fascione
- Lil Fuccillo
- Marco Gabbiadini
- Giulio Giuricich
- Dario Gradi
- Giuliano Grazioli
- Lou Macari
- Giuliano Maiorana
- Tony Marchi
- Peter Marinello
- Dominic Matteo
- Piero Mingoia
- Giovanni Moscardini
- Daniel Nardiello
- Danilo Orsi-Dadomo
- Tom Parrinello
- Simone Perrotta
- Danny Racchi
- Adriano Rigoglioso
- Robert Rosario
- Alessia Russo
- Antoni Šarčević
- Carlo Sartori
- Ricky Sbragia
- Riccardo Scimeca
- Tom Sermanni
- Harry Toffolo
- Paolo Vernazza
- Peter Vincenti
- Giuseppe Wilson

=== Gymnastics ===
- Claudia Fragapane

=== Martial arts ===
- Margot Ciccarelli

=== Motor racing drivers ===
- Paul di Resta
- Dario Franchitti
- Marino Franchitti
- Dario Resta
- Roy Salvadori
- Dino Zamparelli

=== Racehorse jockeys ===
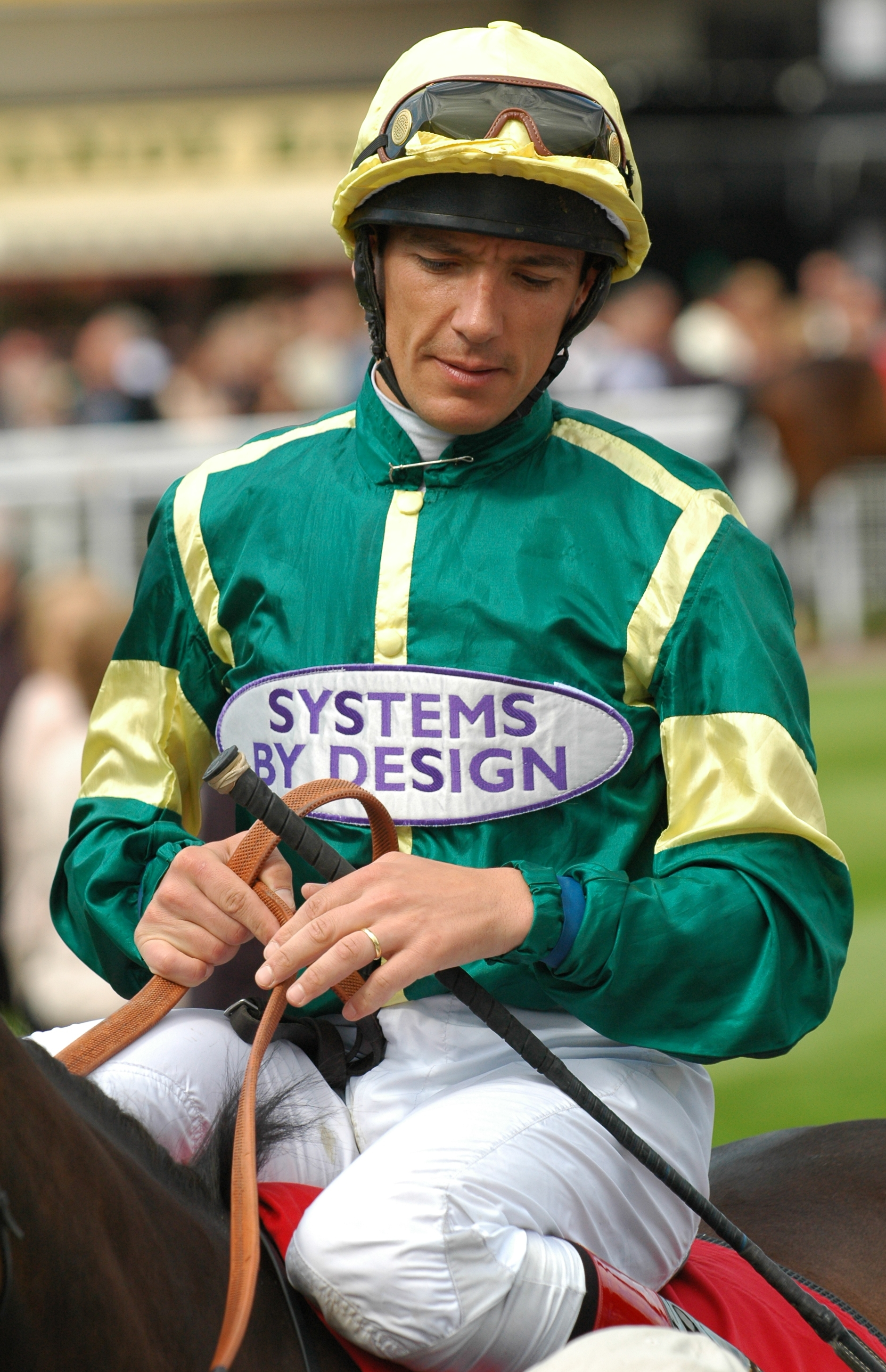
Racehorse jockey Frankie Dettori

- Frankie Dettori

=== Rugby players ===
- Tommaso Allan
- George Biagi
- Danny Cipriani
- Alex Corbisiero
- Lawrence Dallaglio
- Simon Danielli
- Nick De Luca
- Marcus Di Rollo
- Chris Fusaro
- Richard Lepori
- Dominic Manfredi
- Kane Palma-Newport
- Jake Polledri
- James Saltonstall
- Peter Sidoli
- Robert Sidoli
- Warren Spragg
- Marko Stanojevic

=== Snooker ===
- Tony Meo

=== Tennis ===
- Rosamund Colman

== Others ==
- Thomas John Barnardo
- Louisa Grace Bartolini
- Julian Baggini
- Lucy Evangelista
- Peter Falconio
- Elizabeth Maria Molteno
- Helen Pankhurst
- Richard Rogers
- Alessandra "Alex" Spendolini - Frederic "Fred" Sirieix's ex wife

== See also ==
- Immigration to the United Kingdom
- Italian Briton
- Italian diaspora
- Italian people
- List of Italian Americans
