= Samīra al-Māni' =

Iraqi writer (1935–2026)

Samīra al-Māni
- Born: 1935; Basra, Kingdom of Iraq
- Died: 19 June 2026 (aged 91)
- Education: University of Baghdad
- Occupations: Writer, litterateur
- Writing career
- Notable works: Co-founder of the journal Literature in Exile (Arabic: الإغتراب الأدبي, al-ʾiġtirāb al-ʾadabī)

Samīra al-Māni' (Arabic: سميرة المانع; 1935 – 19 June 2026) was an Iraqi writer.

== Life and career ==
Samīra al-Māni' was born in Basra in 1935, and received a BA in Arabic literature from the University of Baghdad. She moved to London in 1965 and earned a diploma in librarianship from Ealing Technical College there in 1976.

In 1985, she co-founded al-Ightirab al-adabi (Arabic: الإغتراب الأدبي, al-ʾiġtirāb al-ʾadabī, Literature in Exile), a literary journal for Iraqi exiles. She participated in the International Writing Program at Iowa University in 1990. In that same year, she also attended the International Festival of Authors in Toronto. Her short stories have been translated into English and Dutch.

Al-Māni' was married to Salah Niazi, the Iraqi poet; the couple had two daughters. She died on 19 June 2026, at the age of 91.

== Literary work ==
Her work often depicts Arab women attempting to adapt to life in other countries.

== Selected works ==
- al-Sabiqun wa-l-lahiqun ("The First and the Last"), novel (1972)
- al-Ghina' ("Singing"), short stories (1976)
- al-Thuna'iya al-Lunduniya ("A London Sequel"), novel (1979)
- Hab! al-surra, novel (1990), published in English as Umbilical Cord (2005)
- al-Nisf faqat ("Only A Half"), play (1994), staged at the International Centre for Women Playwrights in Buffalo
- al-Qami'un ("The Oppressors"), novel (1997)
- al-Ruh wa ghayruha ("The Spirit and Other Things"), short stories (1999)
