= List of British Iraqis =

This is a list of notable British Iraqis, ordered by surname within section.

== Academia ==
- M E H Rasheed - Chartered Scientist
- Nisreen Alwan - public health researcher
- Elie Kedourie - historian
- Jim Al-Khalili OBE - professor of theoretical physics at Surrey University and BBC presenter; born in Baghdad to an Iraqi father and English mother
- Alphonse Mingana
- Hormuzd Rassam
- Sami Timimi - psychiatrist

== Actors/actresses ==
- Zaraah Abrahams - actress
- Yasmin Al-Khudhairi - actress
- Charlotte Lewis - actor; Chilean-Iraqi father
- Muzz - musician
- Yasmin Paige - actress
- Andy Serkis - actor (Iraqi father of Armenian descent)

== Artists ==
- Reem Alasadi - fashion designer
- Suad al-Attar - painter
- Lowkey - UK rapper, born Kareem Dennis; his mother is of Iraqi descent
- Bashar Lulua - conductor; Iraqi father

== Business ==
- Nadhmi Auchi
- Hassan Damluji
- Samuel Hayek - millionaire real-estate tycoon; chairman of the KKL Charitable Trust
- Naim Dangoor - entrepreneur and philanthropist
- Eamon Jubbawy - co-founder of technology company Onfido
- Nemir Kirdar - Iraqi-born billionaire; President and CEO of Investcorp
- Charles Saatchi - co-founder of the advertising agency Saatchi & Saatchi; born in Baghdad and is of Iraqi Jewish descent; owner of the Saatchi Gallery
- Maurice Saatchi - brother of Charles Saatchi; co-founder of Saatchi & Saatchi; born in Baghdad and is of Iraqi Jewish descent

== Film people ==
- Tala Hadid - film director and producer; Iraqi father
- Amrou Al-Kadhi - writer, performer, and director

== Politicians ==
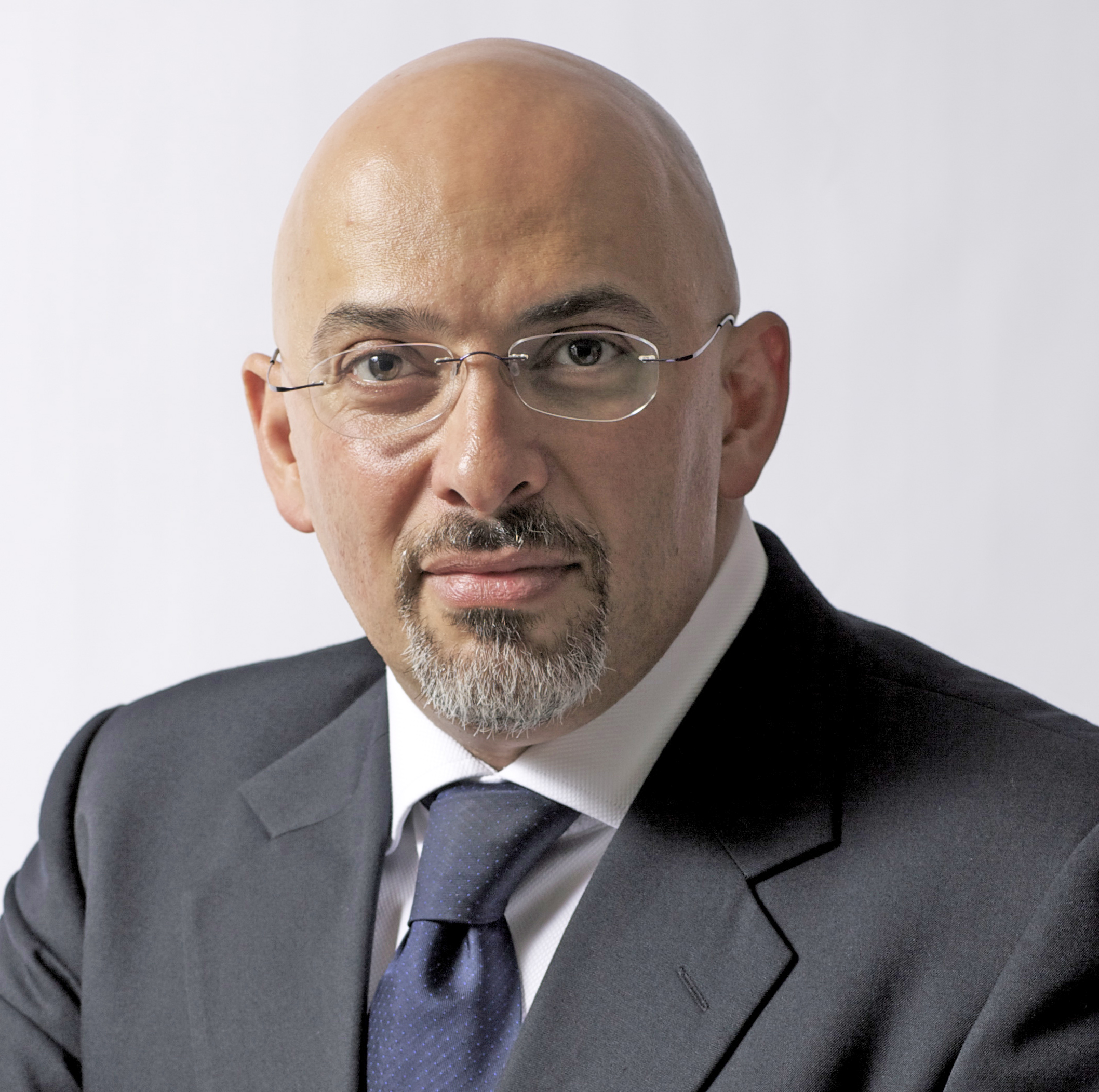
Nadahim Zahawi MP

- Sadik Al-Hassan - Labour Party politician and pharmacist
- Anood Al-Samerai - Southwark based councillor for British political party, the Liberal Democrats and leader of Southwark's Liberal Democrat Group (Iraqi father, English mother)
- Nadhim Zahawi - born in Baghdad to Kurdish parents; co-founded YouGov with Stephan Shakespeare and was YouGov's CEO from 2005 to 2010; elected as a Conservative councillor in Putney in the London Borough of Wandsworth, and served from 1994 to 2006

== Sport ==
- Botan Ameen - footballer
- Alexander Aoraha - footballer
- Riyadh Al-Azzawi - kickboxer
- Youra Eshaya - Assyrian footballer, first Iraqi to play professionally in England
- Zidane Iqbal - footballer

== Writers ==
- Tina Brown - journalist, magazine editor, columnist, talk-show host and author of The Diana Chronicles; part Iraqi on her mother's side
- Mona Chalabi - data journalist; Iraqi parents
- Dalia Al-Dujaili - writer and editor; Iraqi parents
- Saleem Haddad - author; Iraqi-German mother
- Foulath Hadid - writer
- Ruqaya Izzidien - novelist and journalist
- Salah Niazi - poet
- Nussaibah Younis - novelist and screenwriter, former political scientist and humanitarian

== Other ==
- Huda Ammori - activist

== See also ==
- British Iraqis
- List of Iraqis
- List of Iraqi Americans
