= Ramon Harewood =

Barbadian gridiron football player (born 1987)

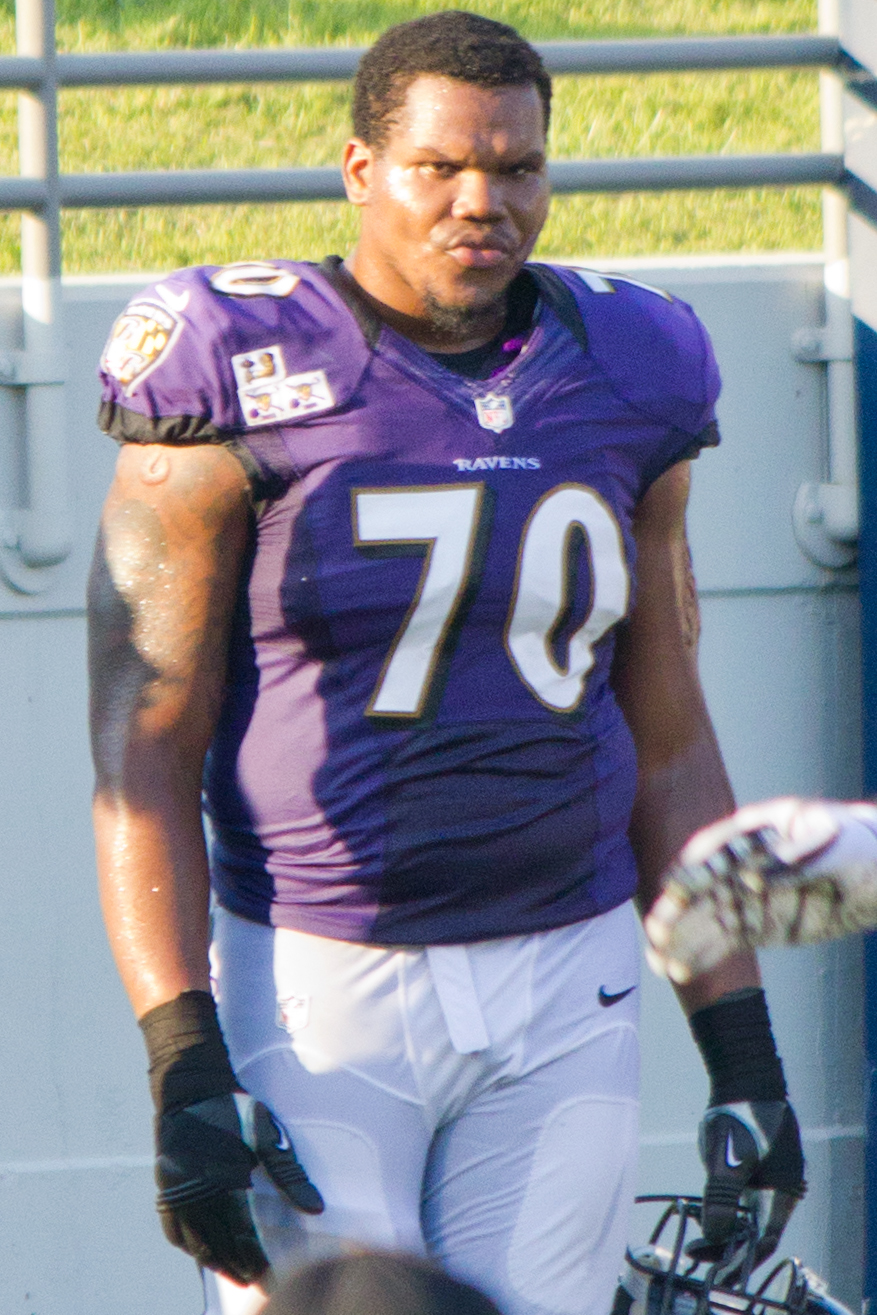
- Harewood during Ravens practice at Navy–Marine Corps Memorial Stadium in 2012

No. 70
- Position: Offensive tackle

Personal information
- Born: 3 February 1987 (age 39); Saint Michael, Barbados
- Listed height: 6 ft 6 in (1.98 m)
- Listed weight: 330 lb (150 kg)

Career information
- High school: Queen's College (Saint Michael, Barbados)
- College: Morehouse
- NFL draft: 2010: 6th round, 194th overall pick

Career history
- Baltimore Ravens (2010−2012); Denver Broncos (2014)*
- * Offseason or practice squad member only

Awards and highlights
- Super Bowl champion (XLVII)

Career NFL statistics
- Games played: 6
- Games started: 5
- Stats at Pro Football Reference

Ramon Harewood
Medal record

Men's athletics

Representing Barbados

CARIFTA Games Youth (U17)
Bronze medal – third place	2003 Port of Spain	Shot put

Ramon Bernard Harewood (born 3 February 1987) is a Barbadian former professional American football offensive tackle. He played college football at Morehouse College in Atlanta, Georgia. He was selected in the sixth round of the 2010 NFL draft, with the Ravens signing him to a three-year contract.

== Professional career ==
Pre-draft measurables
Height	Weight	40-yard dash	10-yard split	20-yard split	Vertical jump	Broad jump	Bench press
6 ft 6 in (1.98 m)	341 lb (155 kg)	5.11 s	1.83 s	2.95 s	24 in (0.61 m)	9 ft 3 in (2.82 m)	22 reps
Values were taken at Morehouse's Pro Day. See also NFL's scouting report.

=== Baltimore Ravens ===
Harewood was selected in the sixth round by the Baltimore Ravens of the 2010 NFL draft with the 194th overall pick. His 2010–2011 season ended prior to the first regular season game, when he underwent surgery on each of his knees and was subsequently placed on injured reserve. His second NFL season was also ended before the start of the regular season, due to surgery on torn ankle ligaments and the Ravens again placing him on injured reserve.

After spending two seasons on injured reserve, Harewood went into the 2012 season and won the starting job at left guard. He made his debut in week 1 of the NFL season against the Cincinnati Bengals. He would play every offensive snap for the first five weeks of the season as well as some on special teams. However, despite playing well during this time, he lost his starting job to the veteran Bobbie Williams, who had been picked during the offseason prior to the start of the season. Harewood would remain inactive until Week 17 against the Bengals, where he played one offensive snap along with four snaps on special teams. He would not play another snap in the NFL, but would earn a Super Bowl ring when the Ravens defeated the San Francisco 49ers 34–31 in Super Bowl XLVII.

On 25 August 2013, he was waived by the Ravens.

=== Denver Broncos ===
Harewood, along with seven other players, were signed to future contracts with the Denver Broncos on 22 January 2014. He was waived by the Broncos on 3 June 2014.

== See also ==
- List of Barbadian Americans
