= Juan Solari =

- Born: Mexico
- Occupations: Media Academic; VO artist TV & Film Director; Video Journalist; Actor

Juan Solari is a Higher Education Fellow at City St. Georges University of London where he lectures in the MA Broadcast Journalism degree since 2024. He is a British TV and film director, producer, actor, voice over artist, video journalist and Media Academic of Mexican origin.

== Career ==
Juan Solari worked in Mexico City from around 1984 to 1999. During this time, he performed in theatre and directed several television series and advertisements.

In late 1999, he moved to London and in 2003 he completed a MA in AudioVisual Production (as a Film Director) at London Metropolitan University with his short film, the thriller Marionettes.

Shortly after, he founded Solar Dreams Productions Ltd. an independent TV production company in the UK. He then produced hundreds of VT news packages for an array of international media outlets from the UK, as MTV and Yle in Finland, ANT1 in Greece, ADN 40 in Mexico, Caracol in Colombia, Chilevisión in Chile, and Telefe and El Trece in Argentina.

During this period he was the self-shooting director and Correspondent for the UK for TV Azteca, interviewing a wide array or personalities, including Bill Clinton, Tony Blair, Sting and The Police, Julio Iglesias, Usain Bolt, Lionel Messi, Cristiano Ronaldo, Roger Federer, Rafael Nadal and many others. He had a few stints as a sports correspondent in the UK for ESPN Latinamerica.

In 2006, he was nominated by the Foreign Press Association in London for a "Story of the Year" award for his documentary Iran, Behind the Door Line.

After being invited by the Universities of Cambridge and Southampton, Solari taught two film-making seminars at these institutions.

Juan Solari was hired as the live studio manager of ESPN Latin America for the London 2012 Olympic Games.

In 2014, he returned to theatre to direct the rehearsed reading of the award-winning theatre play Musica de Balas at Time Out's best fringe venue in London, the White Bear Theatre.

During the 2020-21 Covid Pandemic and on and off lockdowns, Solari produced and presented from his flat in London a live weekly TV show called "El Demoño Azul, Análisis de Noticias y mucho más" that ran uninterruptedly for a full year every Sunday; the streamed show was a combination of entertainment and world news analysis that he presented under the disguise of a specially created alter ego (El Demoño Azul). The show portrayed a wide variety of high-profile Mexican personalities from pop singers to academics and journalists.

He worked for almost four years as a Senior Lecturer and Course Director for the BA in Journalism at the School of Arts & Creative Industries at London South Bank University.

He is currently a lecturer and HEA Fellow for the MA in Broadcast Journalism at City, University of London.

Tennis officiating is one of Juan Solari's main interests. He is an LTA-certified tennis umpire and referee and officiated at the Wimbledon Championships from 2015 to 2023. In 2022, he was selected as a line umpire for the Wimbledon Gentlemen's Singles Final between Novak Djokovic and Nick Kyrgios, officiating the left centre service line.

His participation marked a particularly significant milestone for a Mexican tennis official. As of 2026, Solari is believed to be the only Mexican to have participated in a Wimbledon Gentlemen's Singles Final, either as a player or as an on-court official. .

== See also ==
- List of Mexican British people
