= List of Spaniards in the United Kingdom =

This is a list of notable Spaniards in the United Kingdom who have at least one Spanish parent, ordered by surname within section.

== Actors ==
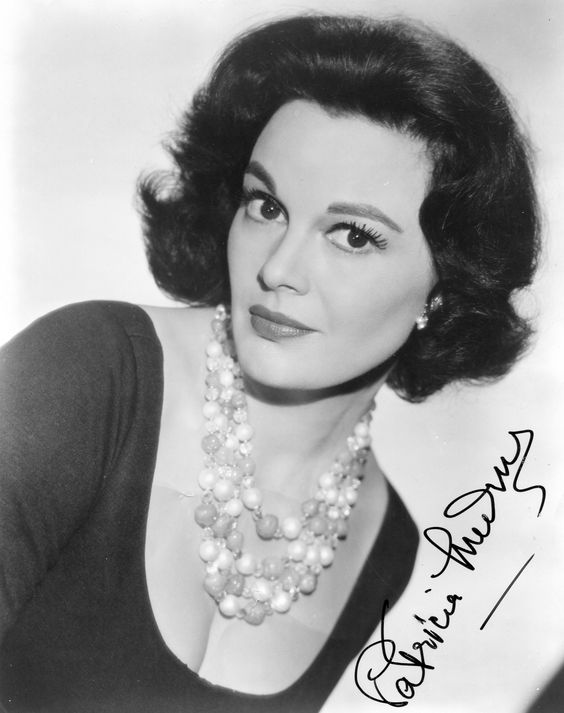
Patricia Medina

- Douglas Booth, actor, mother of Spanish ancestry
- Raquel Cassidy, actress, Spanish mother
- Oona Chaplin, actress, Spanish citizen
- Roger Delgado, actor, played The Master in Doctor Who, Spanish father
- Patsy Ferran, actress, Spanish-born citizen
- Dafne Keen, actress, played Laura in Logan, Spanish mother
- Saura Lightfoot Leon, actress, Spanish mother
- John Charles Marquez, actor and a writer, best known for his role as PC Joe Penhale in ITV drama series Doc Martin (2007–present) and Ray Wilson in BBC One's drama In the Club (2014–present).
- Patricia Medina, actress in the 1940s-60s; Spanish father
- Martin Marquez, actor, Spanish father
- Alfred Molina, actor of stage & screen, Spanish father
- Ana Mulvoy-Ten, actress, Spanish mother
- Elena Saurel, actress, Spanish citizen
- Taz Skylar, actor known for his role as Sanji in One Piece, Spanish-born citizen
- Natalia Tena, actress, played Nymphadora Tonks in the Harry Potter film series and Osha in HBOs Game of Thrones, Spanish parents
- Charlotte Vega, actress and model, Spanish paternal grandparents

== Artists ==
- Angela de la Cruz, painter, nominated for the Turner Prize in 2010
- John Galliano, fashion designer, Spanish mother
- Cristina de Middel, photographer
- Tamara Rojo, ballet dancer, currently the artistic director of the English National Ballet, previously the principal dancer with The Royal Ballet

== Business ==
- Ana Patricia Botín, CEO of Santander UK, third largest bank in the UK in terms of deposits

== Lawyers ==
- Miriam González Durántez, wife of former Liberal Democrat Party Leader and former Deputy Prime Minister of the United Kingdom, Rt Hon Nick Clegg MP

== Musicians ==
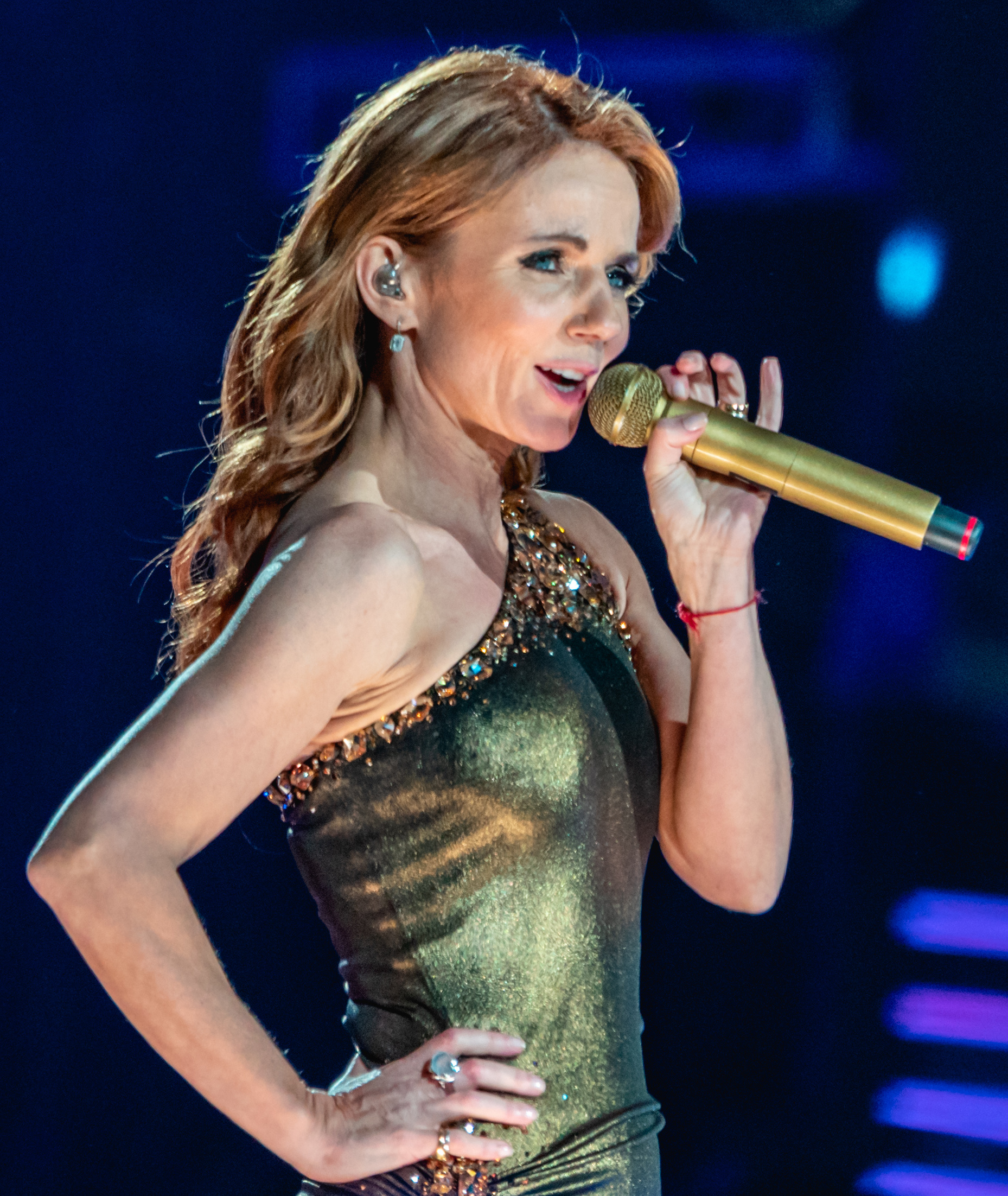
Geri Halliwell

- Carlos Bonell, guitarist
- Paloma Faith, singer; Spanish father
- Geri Halliwell, singer; Spanish mother from Huesca.
- Lita Roza, singer; Spanish father

== Politicians ==
- Michael Portillo, politician and broadcaster; Spanish father
- George Richards, politician, Spanish father

== Royalty ==
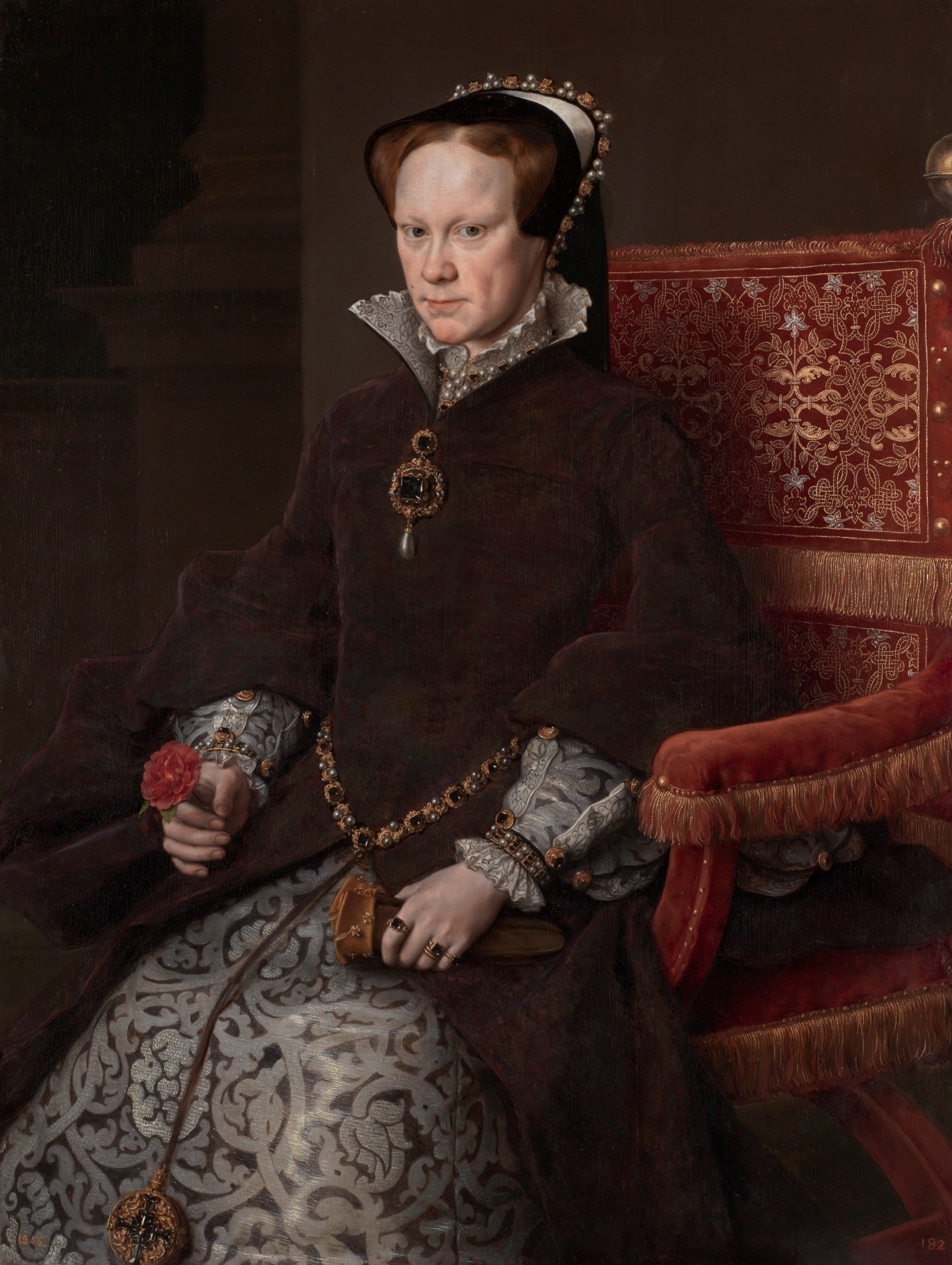
Mary I of England

- Edward II of England, Spanish mother, Eleanor of Castile
- Mary I of England, Queen of England and Ireland, Queen Consort of Spain, Sicily and Naples; Spanish mother, Catherine of Aragon

== Scholars ==
- Felipe Fernández-Armesto, British historian and author of several popular books on revisionist history; Spanish father
- Charles Powell, Director of the Elcano Royal Institute (Madrid) since 28 March 2012; Spanish mother

== Sports ==
- Eva Carneiro, sports doctor; Spanish father
- Joe Gomez, footballer; Spanish mother
- Sam Hidalgo-Clyne, rugby union player
- Adam Lallana, footballer; Spanish grandfather
- Nacho Novo, footballer
- Jay Rodriguez, footballer; Spanish paternal grandparents

== Writers ==
- John Carlin, journalist; Scottish father, Spanish mother
- Joseph Blanco White, Roman Catholic (later, Anglican and Unitarian) theologian and poet in Spanish and English; born in Spain; Spanish father of Irish descent, Spanish mother

== See also ==
- Latin Americans in the United Kingdom
