= Nevada Phillips =

Barbadian-born English cricketer

Personal information
- Full name: Nevada Phillips
- Born: 15 January 1957 (age 69); Barbados
- Batting: Right-handed
- Bowling: Right-arm off break

Domestic team information
- Years: Team
- 1978–1980: Berkshire

Career statistics
Competition	LA
Matches	1
Runs scored	21
Batting average	21.00
100s/50s	–/–
Top score	21
Balls bowled	–
Wickets	–
Bowling average	–
5 wickets in innings	–
10 wickets in match	–
Best bowling	–
Catches/stumpings	–/–
- Source: Cricinfo, 8 August 2010

Nevada Phillips (born 15 January 1957) is a former Barbadian born English cricketer. Phillips was a right-handed batsman who bowled right-arm off break. He was born on the Caribbean island nation of Barbados.

Phillips made his debut for Berkshire in the 1978 Minor Counties Championship against Cornwall. From 1978 to 1980, he represented the county in 14 Minor Counties Championships matches, with his final appearance for the county coming against Oxfordshire.

Phillips also represented the county in a single List-A match against Durham in the 1979 Gillette Cup. In his only List-A match, he scored 21 runs.

He also played 2 Second Eleven Championship matches for the Hampshire Second XI in 1977 and 1978.
