= List of ambassadors of Dominica to China =

Coordinates: 39.952338°N 116.465425°E

Ambassador of the Commonwealth of Dominica to China
- Inaugural holder: David King Hsiu
- Formation: January 5, 2005
- Final holder: David King Hsiu
- Abolished: May 27, 2008

The Dominica ambassador in Beijing was the official representative of the government in Roseau to the government of the People's Republic of China.

- In September 2004 a delegation from Dominica visited the People's Republic of China to take a familiarization tour of Chiana's agricultural practices in two of its major agricultural areas. The six person delegation was headed by Dominica's Minister for Agriculture, Ambrose George. The group's focus was on horticulture, agro-processing, biotechnology, fish farming and exotic crop production. This was the first official delegation by Dominicans since the two countries established diplomatic relation in March 2004. During this visit Dominicans were told that a high level delegation from China's Ministry of Agriculture would take a tour of Dominica's agricultural areas as a first step in formalizing an agricultural technology cooperation program.

== List of representatives ==
Diplomatic agrément/Diplomatic accreditation	ambassador	Observations	List of heads of government of Dominica	Premier of the People's Republic of China	Term end
January 5, 2005	David King Hsiu		Roosevelt Skerrit	Wen Jiabao	May 27, 2008
