= List of British investors =

This is a list of British investors.

- Simon Acland
- Robert Arthington
- Emily Benn
- Mark Blandford
- Jerome Booth
- Richard Branson
- Robert Coke
- Peter Dicks
- Peter Dubens
- Robert Earl
- Anne Glover
- Richard Goldthorpe
- David Grainger
- Charles Green
- Ronald Grierson
- Richard Hambro
- John Hamilton, 2nd Lord Belhaven and Stenton
- David Harding
- Keith R. Harris
- Clive Fiske Harrison
- John Howie
- Thomas Hughes-Hallett
- Arthur Ingram
- Ewan Kirk
- John Langston
- Kevin Johnson
- Lyndon Lea
- J. Keith Lomas
- Michael Moritz
- Stephen Peel
- Yana Peel
- Michael Platt
- John Robert Porter
- John N. Reynolds
- David Ricardo
- Michael Richardson
- Nathan Mayer Rothschild
- Ivor Royston
- Amber Rudd
- Jim Slater
- Smurfie Syco
- Ian Wace
- Craig Whyte
- Annie Henrietta Yule
- Poju Zabludowicz

== See also ==
- Category:British investors
