= Salah Niazi =

Iraqi Poet

- Born: 1935 (age 90–91); Nasiriyah
- Occupations: Poet, translator

Salah Niazi (Arabic: صلاح نيازي, (Ṣalāḥ Nīyāzī); born 1935) is an Iraqi poet and translator from the city of Nasiriyah currently living in the United Kingdom.

== Biography ==
Salah Niazi has lived in the United Kingdom since 1964, when he was exiled from Iraq. He has made important contributions to post-World War II contemporary war poetry and has participated in the literary life of the Iraqi migrant community in the UK. His poems have been translated into several languages, including into English, Spanish, and French. He worked at the BBC Arabic Service for almost twenty years and also received a doctorate from the University of London.

Salah Niazi was married to the late Samira al-Mani (Arabic: سميرة المانع, Samīra al-Māniʿ) who was also a writer from Iraq. Together, they founded a literary journal in 1985, al-Ightirab al-adabi (Arabic: الإغتراب الأدبي, al-ʾiġtirāb al-ʾadabī, Literature in Exile), which highlighted the work of the Iraqi exile community.

Niazi has also translated notable works of the English language, such as James Joyce's Ulysses, which he did so in part to distract himself from the horrors of the Iran-Iraq war of the 1980s. Other translations into Arabic include William Shakespeare's plays, Macbeth, King Lear, and Hamlet.

== Bibliography ==
=== Poetry ===
- 2015: Dizza Castle - Selected Poems, translated by several hands, edited by David Andrews

=== Novels and novellas ===
- 2013: غصن مطعّم في شجرة غريبة (Ġuṣn muṭaʿʿam fī šajara ġarība), an autobiography

=== Translations (English to Arabic) ===
- The Old Capital, by Yasunari Kawabata
- Ulysses, by James Joyce
- The Winslow Boy, by Terence Rattigan
- Hamlet, by William Shakespeare
- Macbeth, by William Shakespeare
