= List of British people with German ancestry =

This is a list of notable British people with German ancestry.

== Academia ==
- Ralf Dahrendorf KBE (1929–2009), sociologist, philosopher, political scientist and liberal politician; born in Hamburg, he acquired British citizenship in 1988
- Geoffrey Elton (1921–1994), (born Gottfried Rudolf Otto Ehrenberg), historian specialising in the Tudor period, born in Tübingen, moved to Britain in 1939
- Edgar Feuchtwanger OBE (1924–2025), born in Munich, historian and author
- Max Müller (1823–1900), comparative philologist and Orientalist, born in Dessau, became professor at Oxford University in 1850
- Marius Ostrowski (born 1988), political theorist and historian of ideas and ideologies, born in Frankfurt am Main, moved to Britain in 1994
- Timothy Reuter (1947–2002), historian of medieval Europe whose father was born in Germany.
- John Stein, professor of physiology and fellow of Magdalen College, Oxford; brother of the chef Rick Stein
- J. R. R. Tolkien CBE (1892–1973), writer, poet, philologist, linguist and professor of Anglo-Saxon; his family had German roots but had been living in England since the 18th century; "Tolkien" derives from the German "tollkühn", meaning "foolhardy".
- Sir Guenter Treitel (1928–2019), academic lawyer and expert in English contract law; emigrated on the Kindertransport in 1939

== Aristocracy and royalty ==
- The Astor family, originally from Walldorf but gained prominence in both America and England; the English branch holds two hereditary peerages: Viscount Astor and Baron Astor
- The British royal family, who belong to the House of Windsor (a branch of the House of Saxe-Coburg and Gotha); George V (1865–1936), of the United Kingdom changed the name of his branch from Saxe-Coburg and Gotha to Windsor in 1917; through Queen Victoria, the current royal family are also descended from the House of Hanover (see entry below)
  - Queen Mary of Teck (1867–1953), consort of George V, (1865–1936); born in Kensington Palace, London, she was a member of the House of Württemberg (through her father Francis, Duke of Teck, (1837–1900) and also a descendant of the House of Hanover (through her mother Princess Mary Adelaide of Cambridge, (1833–1897).
  - Prince Philip, Duke of Edinburgh (1921–2021), member of the British Royal Family by marriage (consort of Elizabeth II), and member of the House of Schleswig-Holstein-Sonderburg-Glücksburg by birth
- John Dalberg-Acton, 1st Baron Acton (1834–1902), referred to simply as Lord Acton, Catholic historian, politician and writer, whose mother was a scion of the noble German Dalberg family
- Lady Mary Victoria Douglas-Hamilton (1850–1922), (later Hereditary Princess of Monaco), mother was a member of the House of Baden
- Natalia Grosvenor, Duchess of Westminster (born 1959), wife of Gerald Grosvenor, 6th Duke of Westminster, OBE (1951–2016), and great-granddaughter of Julius Wernher (1850–1912)
- The House of Hanover, German royal dynasty who produced seven British monarchs: George I, George II, George III, George IV, William IV and Victoria
- Harold Augustus Wernher (1893–1973), 3rd Baronet, peer, grandfather of the above Natalia Grosvenor (née Phillips) and son of Julius Wernher (1850–1912). The Mountbatten family also has German origin.

== Art ==
- Frank Auerbach (1931–2024), artist, born in Berlin, emigrated 1939
- Lucian Freud (1922–2011), painter, born in Berlin, emigrated 1933
- Walter Sickert (1860–1942), Munich-born painter of Danish-German, English and Irish descent; emigrated 1868; son of the painter Oswald Sickert, (1828–1885)

== Commerce ==
- Siegfried Bettmann (1863-1951), founder of motorcycle maker Triumph Engineering and car maker Triumph Motor Company, came from Bettmannsäge, emigrated 1885
- Charles Beyer (1813–1876), born Carl Friedrich Beyer, co-founder of railway locomotive builder Beyer, Peacock & Company, born in Plauen
- Henry Bolckow (1806–1878), co-founder of steelmaker Bolckow, Vaughan and Liberal MP & politician, emigrated 1827.
- Ernest Cassel (1852–1921), merchant banker of Ashkenazi Jewish descent, born in Cologne
- Henry Dübs (1816–1876), born Heinrich Dübs in Guntersblum, founder of railway locomotive builder Dübs & Company, emigrated 1842.
- John Goodman (ca. 1857–1929), born Johannes Gütgemann in Oberwinter, emigrated aged 19, founder of motorcycle maker Velocette
- Tiny Rowland (1917–1998), originally Roland Walter Fuhrhop, Rhodesian-British chairman of the Lonrho conglomerate 1962–94
- Gustav Wilhelm Wolff (1834–1913), born in Hamburg, moved to Liverpool in 1849, co-founded shipbuilder Harland & Wolff, Conservative MP

== Entertainment ==
- Alia Bhatt (born 1993), Bollywood actress of Indian and German descent
- Simon Callow CBE (born 1949), actor of English, Danish, German and French descent
- Julian Clary (born 1959), comedian with a paternal great-grandfather and a maternal great-grandmother who were born in Germany.
- Sacha Baron Cohen (born 1971), actor, comedian, Israeli mother born to German Jewish parents
- Ernest Cossart (1876–1951), actor born as Emil von Holst; brother of the composer Gustav Holst, (1874–1934), of German, Swedish, British, Latvian and Spanish descent
- Rupert Everett (born 1959), actor, his great-great-grandmother was Augusta Clara de Schmiedern
- Richard E. Grant (born 1957), actor of Dutch-Afrikaner, Hungarian and half-German descent.
- Jenny Hanley (born 1947), actress of English descent through her father, Jimmy Hanley (1918–1970), and Russian-Jewish and German descent through her mother Dinah Sheridan (1920–2012).
- Gerard Hoffnung (1925–1959), Jewish-German musical humourist, born in Berlin who arrived in Britain in 1939 as a Kindertransport refugee.
- Derek Jacobi CBE (born 1938), actor and film director, his great-grandfather, William Jacobi emigrated from Germany in the 19th C.
- Frederick Jaeger (1928–2004), actor, born in Berlin, but moved to England with Adolf Hitler's rise to power
- Jodhi May (born 1975), actress of French-Turkish Jewish and German descent
- Robert Morley CBE (1908–1992), actor, his mother, Gertrude Emily (née Fass), came from a German family that had emigrated to South Africa
- Olivia Newton-John DBE (1948–2022), actress and singer, matrilineal granddaughter of Max Born (1882–1970) a Nobel physicist; her mother and maternal grandparents were Jewish German.
- Soni Razdan (born 1956), Bollywood actress, born to a British mother of German descent
- Carol Reed (1906–1976), film director and illegitimate son of Herbert Beerbohm Tree, (1852–1917)
- Oliver Reed (1938–1999), actor who had Dutch, Lithuanian and German ancestry through his grandfather Herbert Beerbohm Tree, (1852–1917)
- Enn Reitel (born 1950), actor and impressionist; his family arrived as refugees from Estonia and Germany
- Sean Pertwee (born 1964), actor; son of actor Jon Pertwee (1919–1996), and his German wife, Ingeborg (née Rhoesa)
- Mark Sheppard (born 1964), actor and musician, born in London of an Irish and German background
- Dinah Sheridan (1920–2012), actress of Russian-Jewish and German descent
- Claire Stansfield (born 1964), actress, director, fashion designer and model of half-English and half-German descent
- Rick Stein CBE (born 1947), television presenter, chef, restaurateur, whose father, Eric Stein, was of German descent (an ancestor, Julius Otto Stein, emigrated from Germany in the 19th century)
- Herbert Beerbohm Tree (1852–1917), actor and theatre manager who was born as Herbert Draper Beerbohm, son of Julius Beerbohm; his father was of Dutch, Lithuanian and German origin
- Iris Tree (1897–1968), actress, poet and artists' model; daughter of Herbert Beerbohm Tree (1852–1917)
- Viola Tree (1884–1938), actress; daughter of Herbert Beerbohm Tree (1852–1917)
- Peter Ustinov CBE (1921–2004), actor, writer and dramatist of Russian, German, Polish-Jewish and Ethiopian noble descent
- Gordon Warnecke (born 1962), actor of Indo-Guyanese and German descent

== Literature ==
- Sybille Bedford OBE (1911–2006), novelist born in Charlottenburg, west of Berlin
- John Berger (1926–2017), art critic and novelist, grandfather from Trieste
- Max Beerbohm (1872–1956), essayist, novelist and caricaturist who was of German descent; his half-brother was Herbert Beerbohm Tree, (1852–1917); their father was Julius Beerbohm, (1811–1892).
- Ford Madox Ford (1873–1939), novelist emigrated in 1889; his father, Francis Hueffer (1845–1889), was from Germany
- Robert Graves (1895–1985), (full name Robert von Ranke Graves), poet, novelist and scholar, whose German mother was a great-niece of the historian Leopold von Ranke, (1795–1886).
- Adam Hart-Davis (born 1943), historian, photographer, television presenter and scientist; son of Rupert Hart-Davis, (1907–1999)
- Duff Hart-Davis (1936–2025), biographer and journalist, son of Rupert Hart-Davis, (1907–1999)
- Rupert Hart-Davis (1907–1999), man of letters, publisher and editor; great-great-great-grandson of King William IV and, in turn, the German House of Hanover
- Frieda Hughes (born 1960), poet and painter; daughter of Ted Hughes, (1930–1998) and Sylvia Plath, (1932–1963); Sylvia's father, Otto Plath, (1885–1940), was German while her mother, Aurelia Plath, (1906–1994), was of Austrian descent
- Judith Kerr (1923–2019), author of children's books, born in Berlin, her family settled in Britain in 1936
- John Lehmann (1907–1987), man of letters and editor, whose Hamburg-born grandfather, (Augustus) Frederick Lehmann (1826–1891), was a businessman who became a Liberal politician
- Patrick O'Brian CBE (1914–2000), (born Richard Patrick Russ), novelist and translator, the son of a physician of German descent
- Sir Nikolaus Pevsner CBE FBA (1902–1983), historian of art and architecture; born in Leipzig, he moved to England in 1933
- Stephen Spender CBE (1909–1995), poet and novelist, whose mother (Violet Hilda Schuster) had German parents
- J. R. R. Tolkien CBE (1892–1973), writer, poet, philologist, linguist and Professor of Anglo-Saxon (also see entry above in 'Academia')

== Music ==
- Antony Beaumont (born 1949), musicologist, writer, composer and conductor; born in London of Anglo-German and Greek-Romanian heritage
- David Bedford (1937–2011), composer and musician; brother of Steuart Bedford (below) and grandson of Liza Lehmann, (1862–1918)
- Steuart Bedford (1939–2021), conductor and pianist; brother of the above David Bedford and grandson of Liza Lehmann, (1862–1918)
- Justin Broadrick (born 1969), musician known primarily for Godflesh and Jesu; maternal grandparents were German immigrants.
- Frederick Delius (1862–1934), composer born as Fritz Theodore Albert Delius in Bradford, Yorkshire to German parents from Bielefeld
- Georg Friedrich Handel (1685–1759), composer, born as Georg Friedrich Händel; settled in London in 1712
- Gustav Holst (1874–1934), composer of British, Swedish, Spanish, Latvian and German descent
- Bert Jansch (1943–2011), folk musician and descendant of a family from Hamburg, who settled in Scotland in Victorian times

== News and journalism ==
- Matt Frei (born 1963), Channel 4 broadcast journalist, born in Essen, emigrated 1973
- Rachel Johnson (born 1965), editor, journalist, television presenter and writer; sister of Boris and Jo Johnson, and descendant of the House of Württemberg through an illegitimate line
- Laura Kuenssberg (born 1976), journalist; granddaughter of Ekkehard von Kuenssberg CBE (1913–2000)

== Politics and government ==
- David Cameron (born 1966), Conservative Party politician and former Prime Minister, he is descended from the German House of Hanover through his fourth great-grandmother Elizabeth Hay, Countess of Erroll (1801–1856), illegitimate daughter of King William IV
- Alf Dubs, Baron Dubs (born 1932), Labour Party politician
- Eyre Crowe (1864–1925), former diplomat, his mother, Asta von Barby, was a German noblewoman
- Natascha Engel (born 1967), Labour politician and former MP (half-German and half-English descent, born in Berlin)
- Nigel Farage (born 1964), former UKIP & Brexit Party leader, politician, his great-grandfather Charles Justus Schrod (born Carl Julius Schrod), was born to German parents
- Anthony Gueterbock, 18th Baron Berkeley (born 1939), Labour Party peer
- Wera Hobhouse (born 1960), (née von Reden) Liberal Democrat MP for Bath, emigrated 1990
- Boris Johnson (born 1964), Conservative politician and former MP & Prime Minister of the United Kingdom who is descended from the royal German House of Württemberg (and the House of Hanover) through his German great-great-great-grandmother Karolina von Rothenburg (born to Prince Paul of Württemberg and his mistress Frederike Porth)
- Jo Johnson (born 1971), Conservative politician, former MP; brother of Boris and Rachel Johnson, and descendant of the House of Württemberg through an illegitimate line
- Joseph Jonas (1845–1921), former mayor of Sheffield and Imperial German Consul to the city, emigrated 1867.
- Angus Robertson (born 1969), SNP politician and MP; born to a Scottish father and German mother
- Alexander Stafford (born 1987), Conservative politician, former MP for Rother Valley
- Gisela Stuart (born 1955), Labour politician and MP, 1997 to 2017; emigrated here in 1974.

== Science ==
- Andre Geim (born 1958), Russian-born Dutch-British physicist, 2010 Nobel Prize in Physics, working in the School of Physics and Astronomy at the University of Manchester.
- John Herschel (1792–1871), English mathematician, astronomer, chemist and inventor; son of William Herschel (1738–1822), the Hanover-born astronomer who emigrated to Great Britain aged of nineteen
- Sir William Herschel, 2nd Baronet, (1833–1917), forensic scientist; son of the above John Herschel and grandson of William Herschel
- Frederick Lindemann, 1st Viscount Cherwell (1886–1957), scientific adviser and physicist; son of Adolph Friedrich Lindemann, an engineer born in Baden-Baden
- Otto Metzger (1885–1961), German-British engineer, and inventor of an impact-extrusion process for forming seamless zinc and brass cans

== Sport ==
- Jimmy Bullard (born 1978), English former footballer
- Nicky Butt (born 1975), former England international footballer
- Steve Cram (born 1960), English former middle-distance runner
- Daniel Prenn (1904–1991), Russian-born German, Polish, and British world-top-ten tennis player
- Glenn Roeder (1955–2021), English former football club coach
- Emil Voigt (1883–1973), English athlete

== Other ==
- William Stuart-Houston, (1911–1987), half-nephew of Adolf Hitler, emigrated to the USA in 1939

== See also ==
- British people
- German migration to the United Kingdom
- German people
