= Remo Lauricella =

British composer and violinist (1912–2003)

- Born: 1912; London, England
- Died: 19 January 2003 London, England
- Genres: Classical
- Occupations: Composer, violinist
- Instrument: Violin

Remo Lauricella (1912 – 19 January 2003) was a British composer and concert violinist.

He was born in London in 1912, his father coming from Catania in Sicily. Lauricella's father Luigi, a successful tailor with a fashionable clientele, gave him his first violin lessons. He obtained a scholarship to the Royal College of Music in London. He became a friend of Benjamin Britten who was a fellow student of composition under John Ireland. Later he studied at conservatoires in Siena and Santiago de Compostela.

Much of his career was spent as first violinist for the London Philharmonic, although he also played chamber music in many of the world's important music venues.

Benjamin Britten wrote a Fantasy Scherzo for piano trio, retitled "Introduction and Allegro" (unpublished) dedicated to Remo Lauricella and Bernard Richards. It was first performed on 22 November 1986 by Marcia Crayford (violin), Christopher Van Kampen and Ian Brown (piano) (brother of Iona Brown famous violinist) at Wigmore Hall.

Lauricella died on 19 January 2003 in London. Upon his death, his antique Vesuvio Stradivarius (ex antonio brosa) violin, made by Antonio Stradivari in 1727 and previously owned by Jan Hambourg and Antonio Brosa, was left to the Italian town of Cremona. Cremona is both the birthplace of Stradivari as well as the place where the Vesuvio was created. Lauricella owned the Vesuvio since 1968.

== Work ==
- African Interlude, for violin and piano (dedicated to Jascha Heifetz)
- Danza siciliana for violin and piano
- Sonate für Violine c-Moll – Sonata for violin and piano (published 2001)
- Sonate für 2 Violinen – Sonata for two violins
- Sonate für Violine solo – Solo violin sonata (approx. 16 min)
- Impromptu – for solo violin

== Sources ==
- "Remo Lauricello, Selected Works". Apollosound. Archived from the original on 20 August 2008.
- Carlo Vettori. "Remo Lauricella and Antonio Stradivari's "Vesuvio"". Archived from the original on 24 December 2007.
