= List of British Azerbaijanis =

This is a list of notable British Azerbaijani people. This includes Azerbaijani immigrants settled or residing in the United Kingdom and British-born citizens of Azerbaijani ethnic or national origin.

== Music ==
- Jamal Aliyev (born 1993), cellist, born in Baku
- Elyar Fox (born 1995), singer, musician and songwriter
- Nigar Jamal (born 1980), singer, winner of Eurovision Song Contest 2011
- Sami Yusuf (born 1980), singer-songwriter, multi-instrumentalist, composer, record producer, and humanitarian

== Literature ==
- Bahman Forsi, Iranian playwright.

== Politics ==
- Hassan Mirza (1899-1943), former Crown Prince of the Qajar dynasty.

== Sport ==
- Kamal Shalorus (1899-1943), Iranian professional mixed martial artist currently competing in the Lightweight division of ONE FC.
- Jennifer Gadirova (born 2004), British artistic gymnast.
- Jessica Gadirova (born 2004), British artistic gymnast.

== See also ==
- British Azerbaijanis
- List of Azerbaijanis
