= List of Mexican British people =

This is a list of notable Mexican British people, including Mexican immigrants to the UK and British born people of Mexican origin with at least one Mexican parent:

- Philip Awiti-Alcaraz, judoka
- Prisca Awiti Alcaraz, judoka
- Catherine Atkinson, politician
- Paloma Baeza, actress
- Joseph Balderrama, actor
- Charly Clive, actress
- Marcelo Flores, footballer
- Tatiana Flores, footballer
- Peter Gadiot, actor
- Rosianna Halse Rojas, content creator and writer
- Charlie Harper, singer, member of the punk rock band UK Subs
- Jake Nava, music video director
- Dhani Harrison, musician, singer-songwriter
- Jon Paul Phillips, actor and model
- Antonio Pedroza, footballer
- Azela Robinson, actress
- Jack Rudoni, footballer
- Juan Solari, TV and film director, video journalist
