= List of Ghanaians in the United Kingdom =

Ghanaians in the United Kingdom

This is a list of notable Ghanaians in the United Kingdom. The person's Ghanaian citizenship and connection to the Republic of Ghana is shown in birthplace and parentheses.

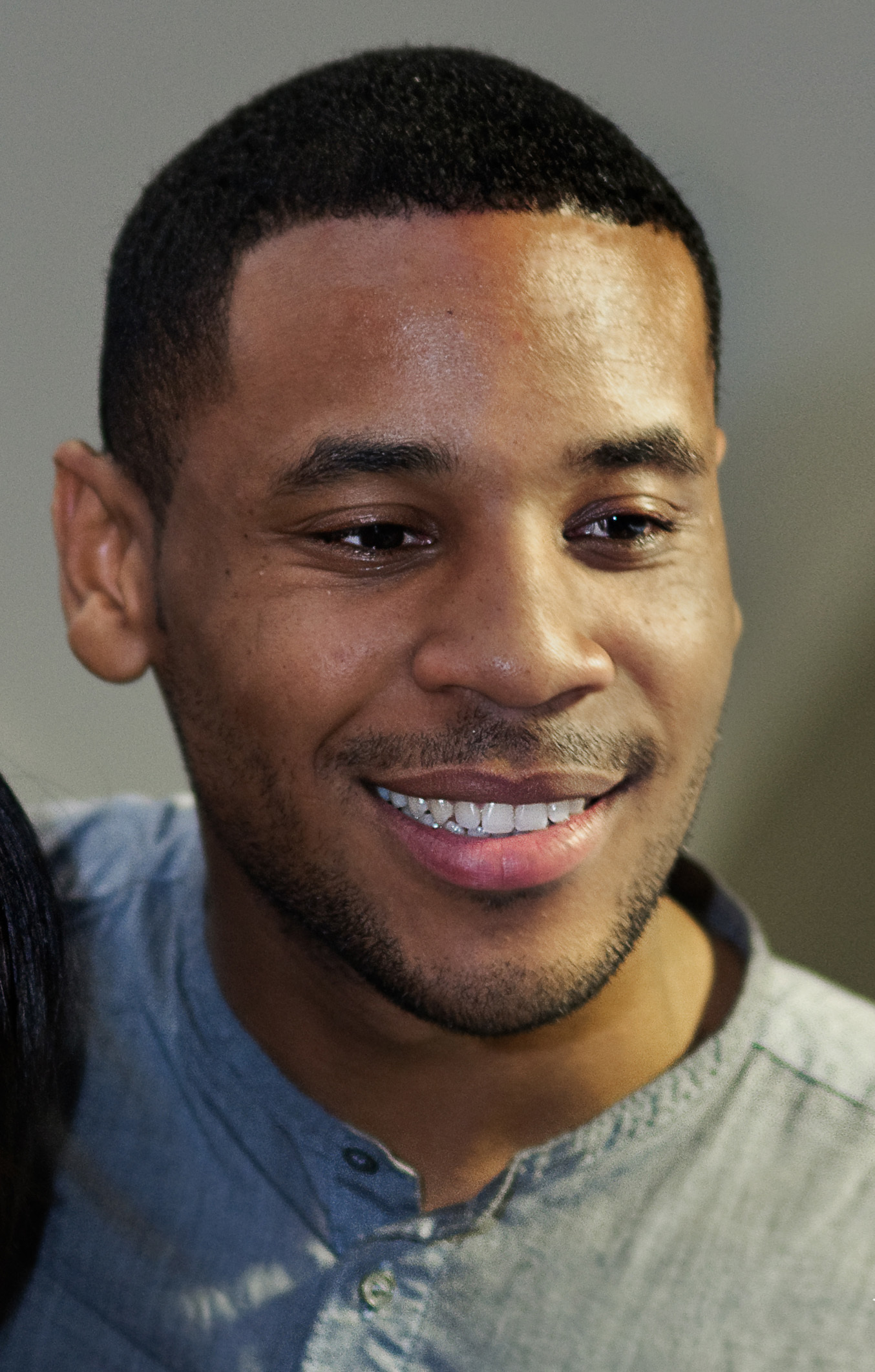
Reggie Yates

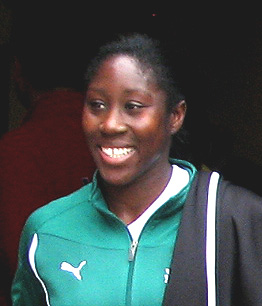
Anita Asante

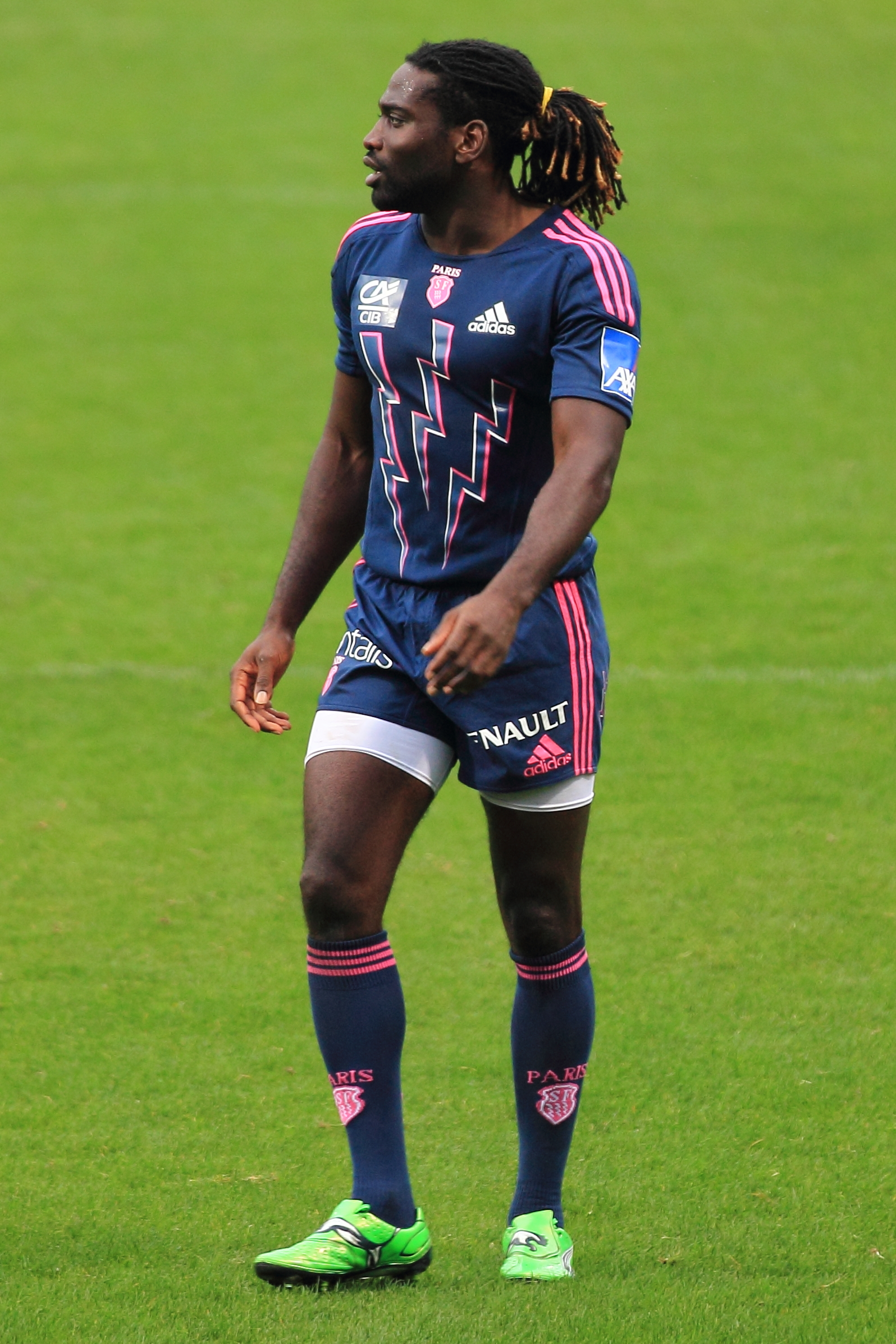
Paul Sackey

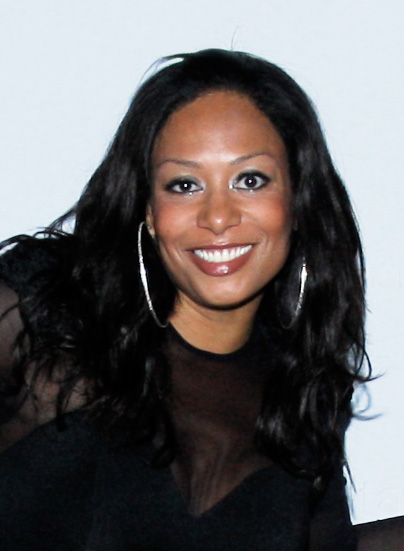
Lisa I'Anson

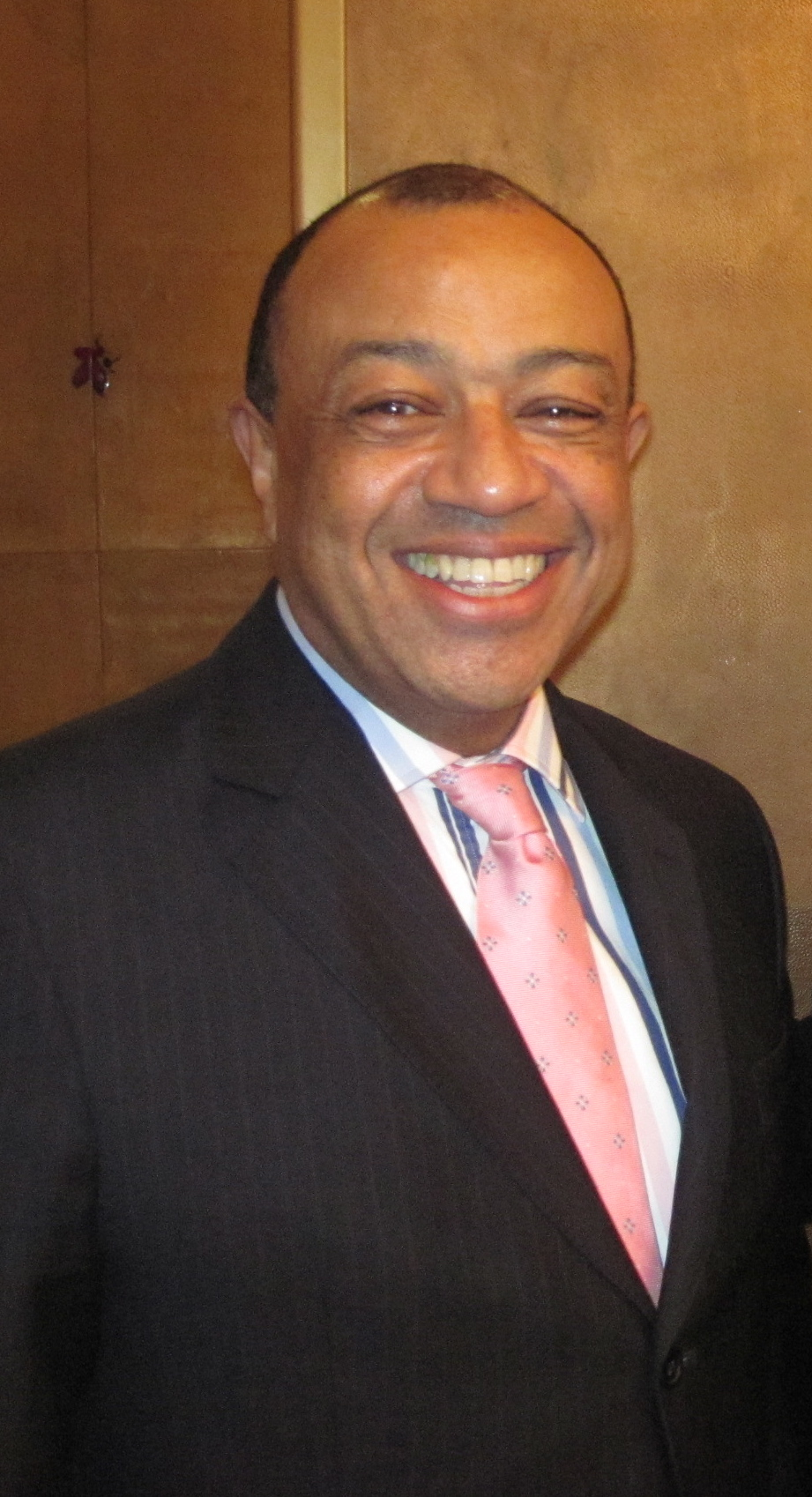
Lord Paul Boateng

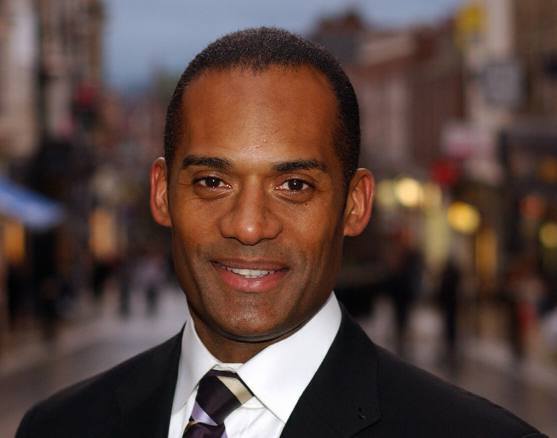
Adam Afriyie

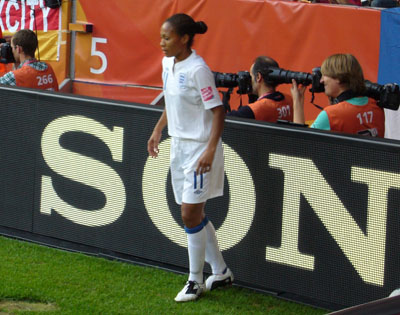
Rachel Yankey

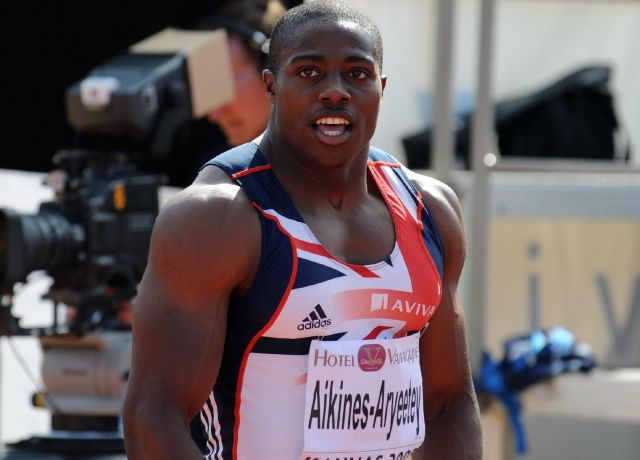
Harry Aikines-Aryeetey

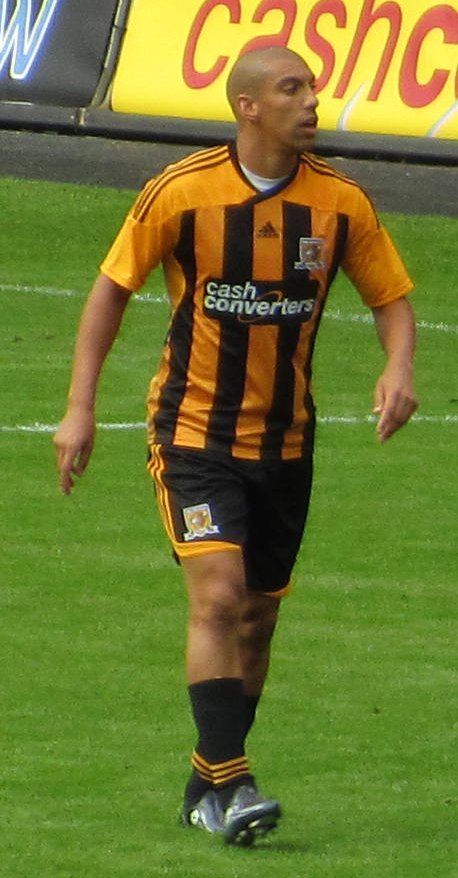
James Harper

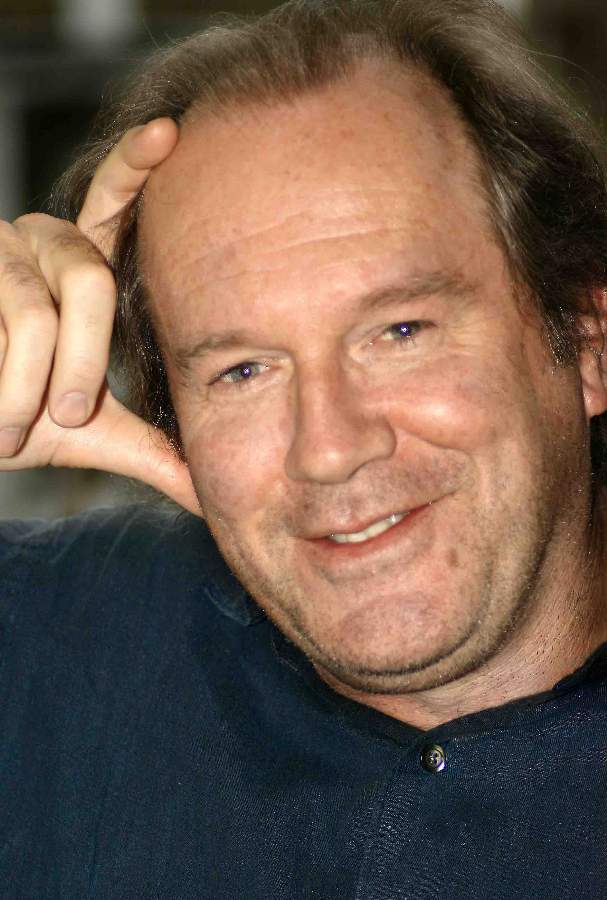
William Boyd

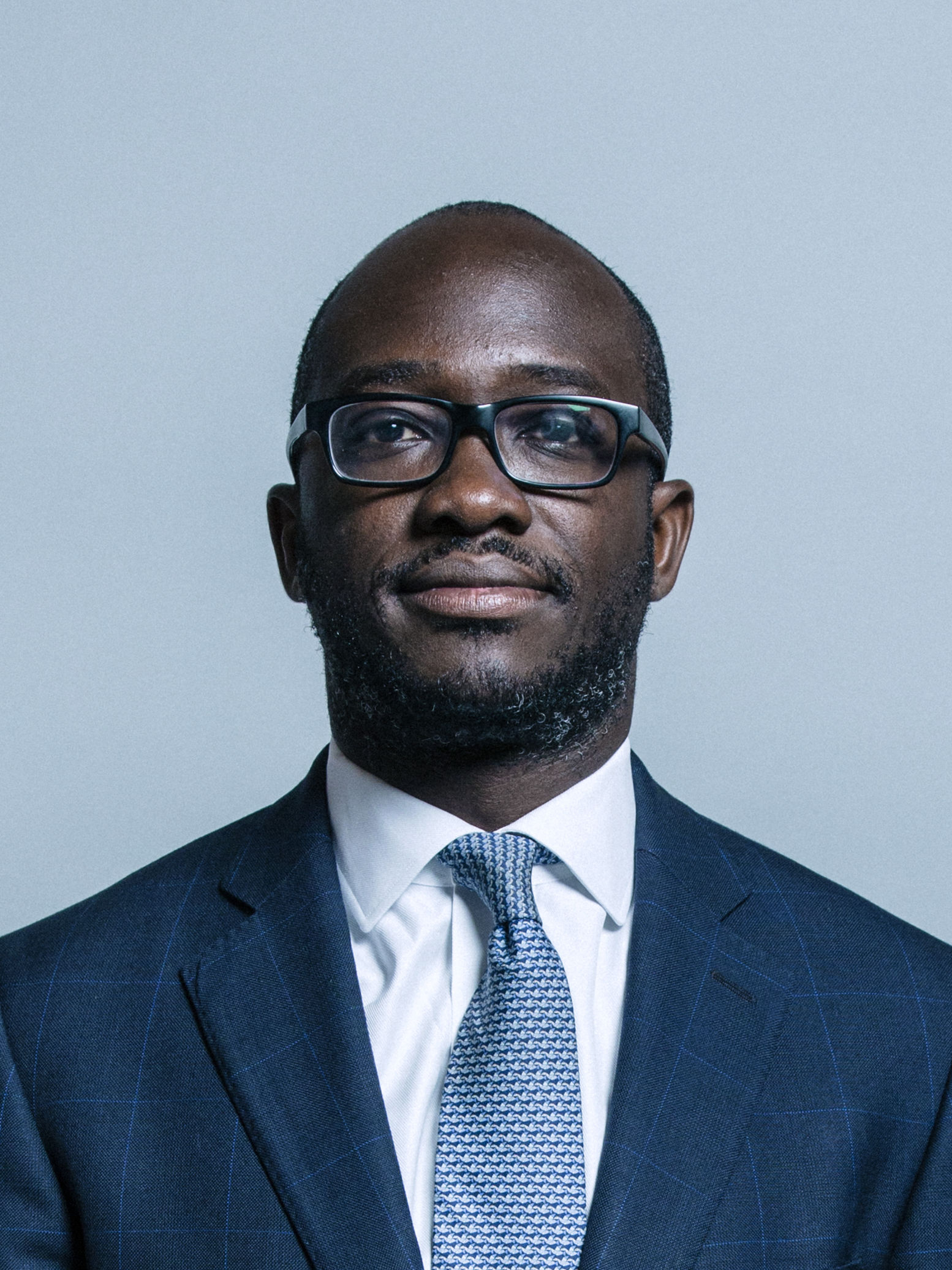
Sam Gyimah

Person	Profession/notability	Place of birth	Link to Ghana	Ref.
Sir David Adjaye, Knight Bachelor / OBE	Architect	Dar es Salaam, Tanzania	Ghanaian mother and father	
William Adoasi	Entrepreneur	Camberwell, London, UK	Ghanaian mother and father	
Adam Afriyie	British Conservative Party politician, businessman and multimillionaire	London, Greater London, UK	English mother, Ghanaian father	
Albert Adomah	Professional footballer for Bristol City F.C. and Ghana national football team	London, Greater London, UK	Ghanaian mother and father	
Freema Agyeman	Television and film actress	Hackney, Greater London, UK	Iranian mother, Ghanaian father	
Patrick Agyemang	Professional footballer for Queens Park Rangers F.C. and Ghana national football team	London, Greater London, UK	Ghanaian mother and father	
Harry Aikines-Aryeetey	Sprinter	London, Greater London, UK	Ghanaian mother and father	
John Akomfrah, CBE	Film director and screenwriter	Accra, Ghana	Ghanaian mother and father	
Adjoa Andoh	Film, television, stage and voice actress	Clifton, Bristol	Ghanaian mother and father	
Samata Angel	Fashion designer	Cambridge, Cambridgeshire, UK	Ghanaian mother and father	
Joey Ansah	Actor and martial artist	London, Greater London, UK	Ghanaian mother and father	
Maxwell "Lethal Bizzle" Ansah	Musician and rapper	London, Greater London, UK	Ghanaian mother and father	
Kwesi Appiah	Professional footballer for Crystal Palace F.C. and Ghana national football team	London, Greater London, UK	Ghanaian mother and father	
Amma Asante, MBE	Writer and film director	Lambeth, London, UK	Ghanaian mother and father	
Anita Asante	Professional female footballer for Göteborg FC and the England women's national football team	London, Greater London, UK	Ghanaian mother and father	
Clare-Hope Ashitey	Actress	London, Greater London, UK	Ghanaian mother and father	
Guvna B	Musician	London, Greater London, UK	Ghanaian mother and father	
Terry Baddoo	CNN International news reporter and columnist for World Football Insider	London, Greater London, UK	English mother, Ghanaian father	
James Barnor	Photographer	Accra, Ghana	Ghanaian mother and father	
Errol "Kojo Funds" Bellot	Musician and rapper	London, Greater London, UK	Ghanaian mother, Dominican father	
Rhian Benson	Soul and jazz singer-songwriter	Accra, Ghana	Welsh mother, Ghanaian father	
Matty Blythe	professional rugby league footballer for Warrington Wolves	Salford, Greater Manchester, UK	Ghanaian mother, English father	
Abrantee Boateng	Radio DJ, TV presenter and club DJ	London, Greater London, UK	Ghanaian mother and father	
Daniel Boateng	Professional footballer for Arsenal F.C.	London, Greater London, UK	Ghanaian mother and father	
Eric Boateng	Professional basketball player for Peristeri B.C. and the Great Britain national basketball team	London, Greater London, UK	Ghanaian mother and father	
Ozwald Boateng, OBE	Fashion designer	London, Greater London, UK	Ghanaian mother and father	
Lord Paul Boateng, The Right Honourable / PC	British Labour Party politician and member of the House of Lords	London, Greater London, UK	Scottish mother, Ghanaian father	
William Boyd, CBE	Novelist and screenwriter	Accra, Ghana	Half-Ghanaian and half-Scottish mother, Scottish father	
Margaret Busby, CBE	Publisher (founder of Allison and Busby), writer, editor, broadcaster	Accra, Ghana	Ghanaian mother, Caribbean father	
Paigey Cakey	MC, rapper, singer and actress	Hackney, Greater London, UK	Ghanaian father, English mother	
Dr Gus Casely-Hayford, OBE	Executive Director (CEO) of Arts Strategy for Arts Council England, curator and cultural historian	Ghana	Sierra Leonean mother, Ghanaian father	
Joe Casely-Hayford, OBE	Fashion designer	Ghana	Sierra Leonean mother, Ghanaian father	
Margaret Casely-Hayford, CBE	Lawyer, Executive Chair of ActionAid UK	London, Greater London, UK	Sierra Leonean mother, Ghanaian father	
Tinchy Stryder	Rapper, music executive, businessman and multimillionaire	Accra, Ghana	Ghanaian mother and father	
Jaye Davidson	Actor	Riverside, California, US	English mother, Ghanaian father	
Chris Dickson	Professional footballer for AEL Limassol and Ghana national football team	London, Greater London, UK	Ghanaian mother, Jamaican father	
Efua Dorkenoo, OBE	Campaigner	Ghana	Ghanaian mother and father	
Idris Elba, OBE	Television, theatre, and film actor	London, Greater London, UK	Ghanaian mother, Sierra Leonean father	
Edward Enninful, OBE	Editor-in-chief of British Vogue	Ghana	Ghanaian mother and father	
Ekow Eshun	Former artistic director of the Institute of Contemporary Arts (London), journalist, writer, and broadcaster	London, Greater London, UK	Ghanaian mother and father	
Kodwo Eshun	Writer, theorist and filmmaker		Ghanaian mother and father	
Paapa Essiedu	Actor	Southwark, London, England	Ghanaian parents	
Emmanuel Frimpong	Professional footballer for Arsenal F.C. and Ghana national football team	Kumasi, Ghana	Ghanaian mother and father	
Ian "Donae'o" Greenidge	Rapper, singer, and musician known for his hit single "Party Hard"	London, Greater London, UK	Ghanaian mother and father	
Sam Gyimah	Liberal Democrat politician, former Member of Parliament for East Surrey	Beaconsfield, Buckinghamshire, UK	Ghanaian mother and father	
James Harper	Professional footballer for Hull City A.F.C.	Chelmsford, Essex, UK	Ghanaian mother, English father	
Afua Hirsch	Journalist	Stavanger, Norway	Ghanaian mother, British father	
Kobna Holdbrook-Smith	Actor	Accra, Ghana		
Lisa I'Anson	Broadcaster and VJ	London, Greater London, UK	Ghanaian mother, Danish father	
Cab Kaye	Jazz musician	London, Greater London, UK	Half-Dutch and half-English mother, Ghanaian father	
Kanya King, CBE	Founder of the MOBO Awards	London, Greater London, UK	Irish mother, Ghanaian father	
Esther Krakue	Political commentator	Ghana	Ghanaian mother and father	
Jeanette Kwakye	Sprinter	London, Greater London, UK	Ghanaian mother and father	
Ras Kwame	Radio DJ and radio presenter	Ghana	Ghanaian mother and father	
Kwasi Kwarteng	Politician and current Chancellor of the Exchequer	London, Greater London, UK	Ghanaian mother and father	
Peter Mensah	Actor	Accra, Ghana	Ghanaian mother and father	
Pops Mensah-Bonsu	Professional basketball player for Beşiktaş Milangaz and the Great Britain national basketball team	London, Greater London, UK	Ghanaian mother and father	
Dylan "Dizzee Rascal" Mills	Rapper and music executive	London, Greater London, UK	Ghanaian mother, Nigerian father	
The Mitchell Brothers	Musician	London, Greater London, UK	Ghanaian mother and English father	
Melvin Odoom	Comedian, radio DJ and television presenter	Bedford, Bedfordshire, UK	Ghanaian mother, Ghanaian father	
Abena Oppong-Asare	Labour politician, Member of Parliament for Erith and Thamesmead	London, Greater London, UK	Ghanaian mother and father	
Mark "Neutrino" Osei-Tutu	Musician, professional rugby player	London, Greater London, UK	Ghanaian mother and father	
Belinda Owusu	Actress	London, Greater London, UK	English mother, Ghanaian father	
Lloyd Owusu	Former professional footballer	Slough, England		
Hugh Quarshie	Actor	Accra, Ghana	Half-Dutch and half-English mother, Ghanaian father	
Nigel Quashie	Professional footballer; only the second black player to represent Scotland in football, and the first since Andrew Watson in 1881	Southwark, Greater London, England	English mother, Ghanaian father	
Caleb Quaye	Rock guitarist and musician	London, Greater London, UK	Scottish mother, part-Ghanaian, part-Dutch and part-English father	
Finley Quaye	Musician	Edinburgh, Scotland	Scottish mother, part-Ghanaian, part-Dutch and part-English father	
Lord Bernard Ribeiro, Knight Bachelor / CBE	Surgeon, former President of the Royal College of Surgeons of England	Achimota, Ghana	Ghanaian mother and father	
Bell Ribeiro-Addy	Labour politician, Member of Parliament for Streatham	Streatham, Greater London, UK	Ghanaian mother and father	
Paul Sackey	Professional rugby union player for Stade Français and the England national rugby union team	London, Greater London, UK	Ghanaian mother and father	
Derek "Sway DaSafo" Safo	Musician	London, Greater London, UK	Ghanaian mother and father	
Lloyd Sam	Professional footballer for Leeds United F.C.	Leeds, West Yorkshire, UK	Ghanaian mother and father	
June Sarpong, OBE	Television presenter	London, Greater London, UK	Ghanaian mother and father	
Adrien Sauvage	Fashion designer, film director and photographer	London, Greater London, UK	Ghanaian mother and father	
Alex Sawyer	Actor	Kent, England, UK	Ghanaian mother, half-Finnish and half-English father	
Jeffrey Schlupp	Professional footballer for Crystal Palace F.C. and Ghana national football team	Hamburg, Germany	Ghanaian mother and father	
Dennis Tuffour	professional rugby league footballer for York City Knights	London, Greater London, UK	Ghanaian mother and father	
Major Nana Kofi Twumasi-Ankrah	British Military Officer, First Black equerry in British monarch history	Accra, Ghana	Ghanaian mother and father	
William Vanderpuye	Actor and renowned voice-over artist	London, Greater London, UK	Ghanaian mother, Dutch father	
Danny Welbeck	Professional footballer for Arsenal F.C. and England national football team	Longsight, Greater Manchester, UK	Ghanaian mother and father	
Arthur Wharton	First black professional association football player in the world	Jamestown, formerly Gold Coast now Ghana	Ghanaian mother, half-Grenadian and half-Scottish father	
Rachel Yankey, OBE	Professional female footballer for Arsenal W.F.C. and the England women's national football team	London, Greater London, UK	English mother, Ghanaian father	
Reggie Yates	Actor, television presenter and radio DJ	London, Greater London, UK	Ghanaian mother and father	
Lynette Yiadom-Boakye	Painter	London, UK	Ghanaian mother and father	
Joshua Buatsi	Boxer, Olympic Bronze medalist	Accra, Ghana	Ghanaian mother and father	
DJ Zel	Radio DJ	UK	Ghanaian mother and father	

== See also ==
- Ghanaians in the United Kingdom
- List of Ghanaians
