= List of Guyanese Britons =

This is a list of notable Guyanese British people.

- John Agard (born 1948), playwright, poet and children's writer
- Kate Scott (born 1981), sports broadcaster
- Arif Ali (born 1935), publisher
- Waheed Alli (born 1964) media entrepreneur and politician, Indo-Guyanese father from Guyana
- Valerie Amos, Baroness Amos (born 1954, British Guiana), Director of SOAS, University of London, UN representative, and Labour Peer in the House of Lords
- Shaheera Asante (born 1979), broadcaster, environmental activist Cambridge, United Kingdom, Guyanese mother
- Harry Baird, actor
- Thomas Baptiste (1929–2018), actor.
- Tina Barrett (born 1976), singer from S Club, Guyanese mother
- Frank Bowling (born British Guiana, 1934), artist
- Gabrielle Brooks (born 1990), actress
- Shakira Caine (born 1947), actress
- Craig Charles (born 1964), actor, comedian and broadcaster, Guyanese father.
- Bob Collymore (1958–2019), Vodafone executive and second CEO of Safaricom
- Peter Davison (born 1951), actor known for All Creatures Great and Small and Doctor Who, Guyanese father
- Nubya Garcia (born 1991), jazz musician, Guyanese mother
- Olivia Dean (born 1999), singer, Guyanese grandmother
- Bernie Grant (1944–2000), British Labour Party politician, Member of Parliament for Tottenham, London, from 1987 to his death in 2000. Born Georgetown, British Guiana
- Eddy Grant (born 1948), Guyanese-born singer and musician
- Eric Huntley (1925–2026), activist, publisher and educator. Co-founder of Bogle-L'Ouverture Publications alongside his wife, Jessica Huntley
- Jessica Huntley (1927–2013), community rights activist, political reformer and publisher.
- Meiling Jin (born 1956), Guyanese-born writer
- David Lammy (born 1972), Labour Party politician serving as Member of Parliament (MP) for Tottenham. Guyanese mother and father
- Central Cee (born 1998), UK drill rapper born to Chinese Guyanese father
- Hew Locke (born 1959), contemporary sculptor, son of Guyanese sculptor Donald Locke
- Phil Lynott, frontman of the rock band Thin Lizzy, with an Afro-Guyanese father
- Gina Miller (born 1965), Guyanese-born business owner known for initiating the 2016 R (Miller and Dos Santos) v Secretary of State for Exiting the European Union court case against the British government over its authority to implement Brexit without approval from Parliament
- Grace Nichols (born 1950), poet
- Trevor Phillips (born 1953), former UK government equality advisor and broadcaster
- Meridian Dan (born 1985), Tottenham-born UK Grime rapper
- Jan Lowe Shinebourne (born 1947), Guyanese-born novelist
- Laurie Taitt (1934–2006), Olympic sprint hurdler
- Aubrey Williams (1926–1990), artist. Born Georgetown, British Guiana
- James Justin (born 1998), professional footballer

== See also ==
- Guyanese people
