= List of Trinidadian Britons =

- Trinidadian Britons

This is a list of notable Trinidadian British people.

- John Alcindor – physician and activist
- Kingsley_Ben-Adir- actor
- Nina Baden-Semper – actress
- Mona Baptiste – actress and singer
- Danielle Belgrave – computer scientist
- Floella Benjamin (Baroness Benjamin) – actress, author, television presenter, businesswoman and politician
- Chris Birchall – footballer, recipient of a CM Medal and currently with Coventry City
- Chris Bisson – actor, East Is East, Coronation Street and Shameless; father and grandfather from Trinidad, great-grandfather was Indian
- Danny Cipriani – rugby union footballer; father was from Trinidad
- Edric Connor – singer, folklorist and actor
- Frank Crichlow – activist
- Lenora Crichlow – actress
- MF Doom – rapper and record producer
- Nubya Garcia – jazz musician; grandfather and grandmother from Trinidad
- Amber Gill – television personality and author
- Darren Henry – politician
- Christian Holder – dancer, choreographer, designer
- Darcus Howe – journalist, broadcaster, activist
- Lennie James – actor
- Stefan Kalipha – actor
- Trevor McDonald – newsreader and journalist
- Althea McNish – artist and designer
- Steve McQueen – film director
- V. S. Naipaul – award winning author and Nobel laureates
- Billy Ocean – singer, born in Trinidad
- Michael Page – professional boxer and mixed martial artist; father was from Trinidad
- Edmundo Ros – Trinidadian musician, vocalist, arranger and bandleader
- Jadon Sancho – footballer for Borussia Dortmund and England; parents are from Trinidad
- Corinne Skinner-Carter – actor
- AJ Tracey – rapper
- Noel Clarke – actor and producer
- Cathy Tyson – actress
- Eamonn Walker – actor
- Don Warrington – actor
- Wiley – rapper and Grime founder
- Jodie Williams – sprinter; mother was from Trinidad

== See also ==
- Trinidadian British
- List of Trinidadians
