= Mäkelä =

- Language: Finnish

Origin
- Meaning: "hill farm", derived from mäke-, form of mäki ("hill") and -lä ("place of, esp. farm")
- Region of origin: Finland

Other names
- Variant forms: Mäki, Mäkilä, Mäkinen

Mäkelä is a surname originating in Finland (in Finnish, it means "hill farm"), where it is the fifth most common surname. Notable people with the surname include:

- Aleksi Mäkelä, multiple people
- Hannu Mäkelä, multiple people
- Mikko Mäkelä, multiple people
- Santeri Mäkelä (1870–1939), Finnish politician
- Lauri Mäkelä (1885–1947), Finnish farmer and politician
- Toini Mäkelä (1895–1973), Finnish socialist revolutionary and military officer
- Toivo Mäkelä (1909–1979), Finnish film actor
- Mauno Mäkela (1916–1987), Finnish film producer
- Väinö Mäkelä (1921–1982), Finnish long-distance runner
- Uljas Mäkelä (1924–2010), Finnish politician
- Yrjö Mäkelä (1926–2015), Finnish decathlete
- Tapio Mäkelä (1926–2016), Finnish cross-country skier
- Kaija Mäkelä (1930–2023), Finnish swimmer
- Matti Mäkelä (born 1939), Finnish association football player
- Bob Makela (1940–1987), American paleontologist of Finnish descent
- Eero Mäkelä (1942–2008), Finnish chef, first Michelin-starred in Finland
- Heikki Mäkelä (1946–2024), Finnish sprint canoeist, Summer Olympics
- Seppo Mäkelä (born 1948), Finnish hockey referee
- Juha Mäkelä (born 1956), Finnish sports shooter
- Laurie Haycock Makela (born 1956), American graphic designer and educator
- Taru Mäkelä (born 1959), Finnish film director and screenwriter
- Taneli Mäkelä (born 1959), Finnish actor, singer and writer
- Jukka Mäkelä (born 1960), Finnish politician
- P. Scott Makela (1960–1999), Finnish-American graphic and type designer, AIGA medalist
- Ilkka Mäkelä (born 1963), Finnish football manager and former player
- Tomi Mäkelä (born 1964), Finnish-German musicologist
- Satu Mäkelä-Nummela (born 1970), Finnish sports shooter
- Janne Mäkelä (born 1971), Finnish footballer
- Marjo-Riikka Mäkelä (born 1971), Finnish actress
- Mika Mäkelä (born 1971), Finnish judoka
- Wille Mäkelä (born 1974), Finnish curler, Olympic medalist
- Jani Mäkelä (born 1976), Finnish politician
- Tuukka Mäkelä (born 1982), Finnish professional ice hockey defenceman
- Juho Mäkelä (born 1983), Finnish footballer
- Valle Mäkelä (born 1986), Finnish motor racing driver
- Heini Mäkelä (born 1987), Finnish footballer
- Tatu Mäkelä (born 1988), Finnish footballer
- Chelsea Makela (born 1990), American actress
- Kristiina Mäkelä (born 1992), Finnish athletics competitor
- Joni Mäkelä (born 1993), Finnish footballer
- Klaus Mäkelä (born 1996), Finnish conductor and cellist
