= Mäkilä =

Origin
- Language: Finnish
- Meaning: "hill farm", derived from mäki ("hill") and -lä ("place of, esp. farm")
- Region of origin: Finland

Other names
- Variant forms: Mäkelä, Mäki, Mäkinen

Mäkilä is a Finnish surname meaning "hill farm". Notable people with the surname include:

- Antti Mäkilä (born 1989), Finnish ice hockey player
- Asko Mäkilä (1944–2012), Finish footballer
- Jali Mäkilä (born 1965), Finnish sailor
- Jussi Mäkilä (born 1974), Finnish mountain bike orienteer
- Mia Mäkilä (born 1973), Swedish artist
- Sasha Mäkilä (born 1973), Finnish conductor
- Ville Mäkilä (born 1990), Finnish footballer

== See also ==
- The dictionary definition of Mäkilä at Wiktionary
