= Esu =

Esu or ESU may refer to:

== Geography ==
- Esu, Central Alaskan Yup'ik language

== People ==
- Esu Niemelä (1921–1999), Finnish politician
- Ivara Esu (born 1951), Nigerian academic administrator
- Ozak Esu (born 1991), Nigerian engineer

== Religion and mythology ==
- Eshu, a divinity in the Yoruba religion

== Places ==
- Essaouira-Mogador Airport, in Morocco

== Entertainment and fiction ==
- S pronounced esu, Class S (genre), a Japanese genre of girl's fiction
- Esu Sagiri (冴霧 笑主) from Ensemble Stars!.

== Acronyms ==
=== Education ===
- East Stroudsburg University of Pennsylvania, USA
- Educational Service Units of Nebraska, USA
- Emporia State University in Kansas, USA

=== Groups and organizations ===
- European Students' Union
- Emergency service unit, a police tactical unit
  - Emergency Service Unit, a police tactical unit of the NYPD
- Energy Services Union, an Irish trade union
- Explorer Scout Unit, of the Explorer Scouts
- English-Speaking Union, an international educational charity
- Empire State University

=== Science and medicine ===
- Electrostatic units, a system of units
  - Electrostatic unit, or statcoulomb, its unit of charge
- Evolutionarily significant unit
- Electrosurgical unit, used in electrosurgery
- Extended Security Updates, a Microsoft service

== See also ==
- Esus (disambiguation)
