= Jussi Mäkinen =

Finnish diplomat and ambassador (1929–1978)

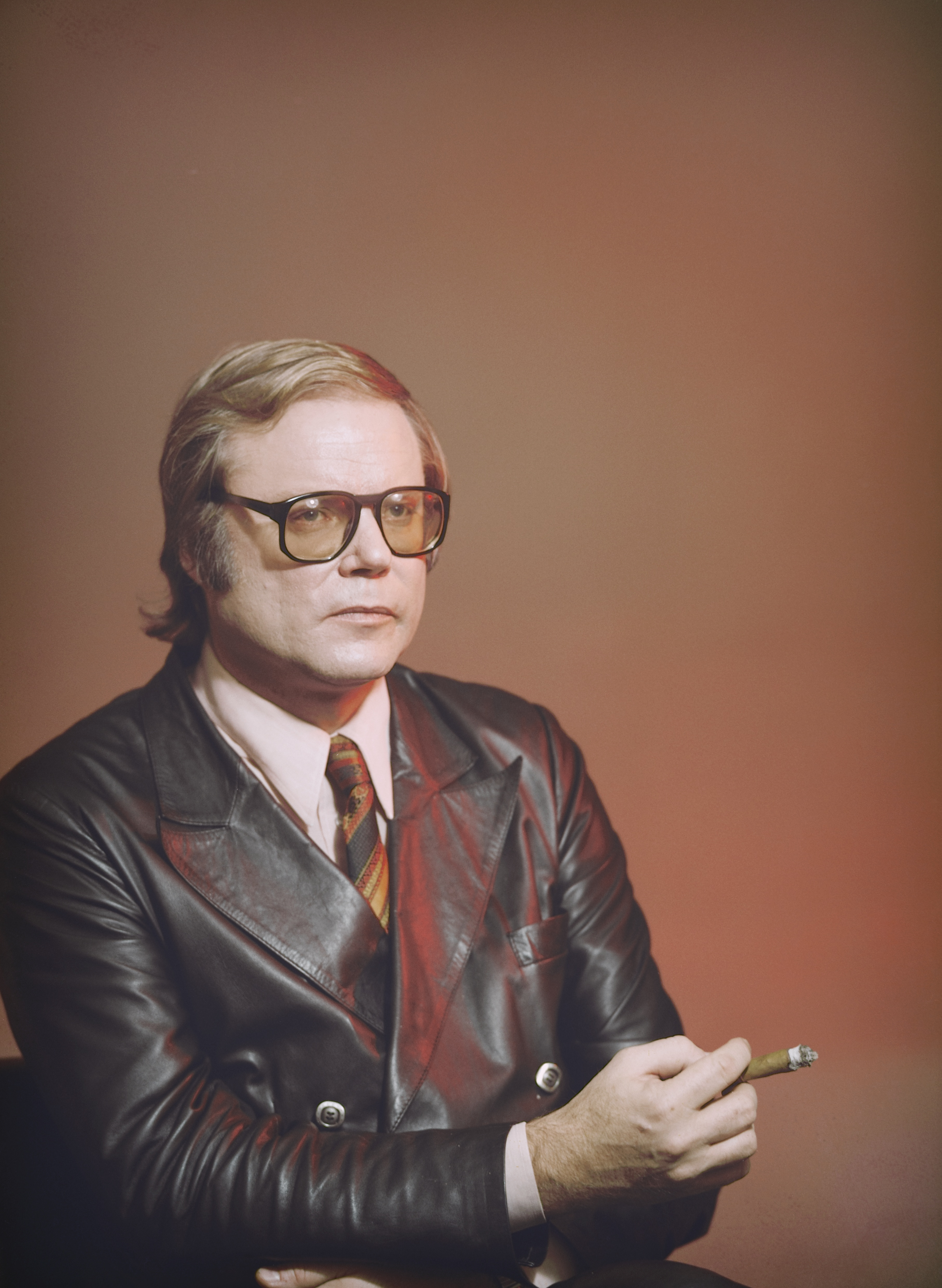
- Jussi Mäkinen in 1974

1st Finland Ambassador to Algeria
- In office 1963–1968
- Succeeded by: Olavi Saikku

3rd Finland Ambassador to Tunisia
- In office 1964–1968
- Preceded by: T. O. Vahervuori
- Succeeded by: Olavi Saikku

Finland Ambassador to Libya
- In office 1966–1968
- Succeeded by: Olavi Saikku

9th Finland Ambassador to Austria
- In office 1968–1976
- Preceded by: Otso Wartiovaara
- Succeeded by: Seppo Pietinen

8th Finland Ambassador to the Holy See
- In office 1968–1976
- Preceded by: Otso Wartiovaara
- Succeeded by: Seppo Pietinen

3rd Finland Ambassador to United Nations
- In office 1968–1976
- Preceded by: Otso Wartiovaara
- Succeeded by: Seppo Pietinen

Personal details
- Born: February 16, 1929 Kuusjärvi, Finland
- Died: October 2, 1978 (aged 49) Helsinki, Finland
- Profession: Diplomat

Jussi Mäkinen (16 February 1929–2 October 1978) was a Finnish diplomat and ambassador, who attracted public attention in the 1970s for his homosexuality and alcohol problems.

== Early life ==
Mäkinen's parents were Counselor Eero Mäkinen and Else Mäkinen (née Westerholm), founders of global stainless steel manufacturer Outokumpu. In 1946, the family moved to Helsinki where Mäkinen began studying at the Helsinki Normal School at the age of 17. He graduated three years later with a Master's of Political Science.

== Career ==
Mäkinen joined the Ministry for Foreign Affairs in February 1950. Shortly thereafter, he became secretary for Prime Minister Urho Kekkonen. He drafted speeches for Kekkonen and prepared him for foreign visits and meetings. The two became friends and remained close until Mäkinen's death.

On his first foreign mission, Mäkinen accompanied Kekkonen to Moscow, where he participated in organizing aspects of Joseph Stalin's funeral in 1953 and, together with Kekkonen, placed the official wreath of Finland on Stalin's coffin.

After returning to Finland, Mäkinen became deputy secretary to the Foreign Minister and later was posted to the Finnish Mission in West Germany. From 1960 to 1963, Mäkinen served as a Delegation Counselor at the Finnish Embassy. He worked as now President Kekkonen's interpreter during conversations with the former President of France, Charles de Gaulle, in 1962.

In 1963, Mäkinen was appointed Ambassador of Finland to Algeria, which had just won its independence from France the previous year. From Algiers, Mäkinen also handled ambassadorial duties for Tunisia and Libya, along with other points in the Maghreb and Middle East.

In 1968, Mäkinen was posted to Vienna to serve as ambassador to Austria. He also served as the Permanent Representative of Finland to U.N. Headquarters in Vienna and as ambassador to the Holy See. Mäkinen drew attention for travelling between Vienna and Rome by motorcycle.

=== Controversies ===
There were some controversies during this period. In 1969, for example, Finland did not condemn the Al-Aqsa mosque fire in the United Nations Security Council. Mäkinen sent a telegram to Rabat, Morocco during the Islamic Conference, but failed to make a statement about Finland's official position.

Also, Mäkinen's alcohol consumption and relationships began to attract public and media attention. In one notable incident, Mäkinen was stopped while he and his boyfriend drove naked on his motorbike along the Schönbrunn Palace park garden. In 1972, Mäkinen accused Romanian officials of planning to murder him. By 1976, Kekkonen was no longer willing to appoint Mäkinen to positions within the Foreign Ministry.

== Retirement ==
Upon Mäkinen's return to Finland 1976, he withdrew political life. He died in 1978 and was buried at Hietaniemi Cemetery.
