= Elephant and Castle Mob =

Defunct London street gang

- Founded: 1920s
- Founding location: London, England
- Years active: 1920s–1930s
- Territory: Various neighborhoods in London
- Ethnicity: Mainly British: English, Welsh, Scottish and also Jews.
- Membership (est.): 30-40
- Criminal activities: Bookmaking, extortion, murder, counterfeiting, hooliganism, assault, robbery, fraud, hijacking, fencing, theft, smuggling and bribery
- Allies: Birmingham Boys and Hoxton Gang
- Rivals: Sabini gang

The Elephant and Castle Mob were one of the many independent street gangs active in London's underworld during the interwar years. A rival of mobster Charles "Darby" Sabini along with the Birmingham Boys and the Cortesi brothers of Saffron Hill, they were eventually forced out by Sabini with the added manpower of imported Sicilian mafiosi and had disappeared from the city by the end of the Second World War.

They were allied to the Birmingham gang, often called the Brummagems, led by Billy Kimber; the Camden Town gang, led by George Sage and the Finsbury Boys, led by Freddie Gilbert. The gangs rivalled those from north and east London led by Darby Sabini, Alf White, Alf Solomon and Dodger Mullins.

The gang achieved dominance on the race courses and in London's West End by conquering the West End Boys, led by the McCausland brothers, and the King's Cross/Titanic gang led by Alf White. From the 1910s to the 1930s, they were led by the McDonald brothers, Wag and Wal, and battled the Sabini gang for control of allocation of bookmaking pitches on racecourses and the provision of 'services' to bookmakers who were terrorised into paying for them.

Wag McDonald left London for Los Angeles, where he became bodyguard to Mafia boss Jack Dragna in the 1920s and to many Hollywood celebrities, including Charlie Chaplin. Wag's brother, Bert McDonald, who was the one-time boyfriend of Forty Elephants leader Alice Diamond, was killed in the Los Angeles mafia wars.
