= Laihia =

Laihia Laihela
- Municipality
- Laihian kunta Laihela kommun
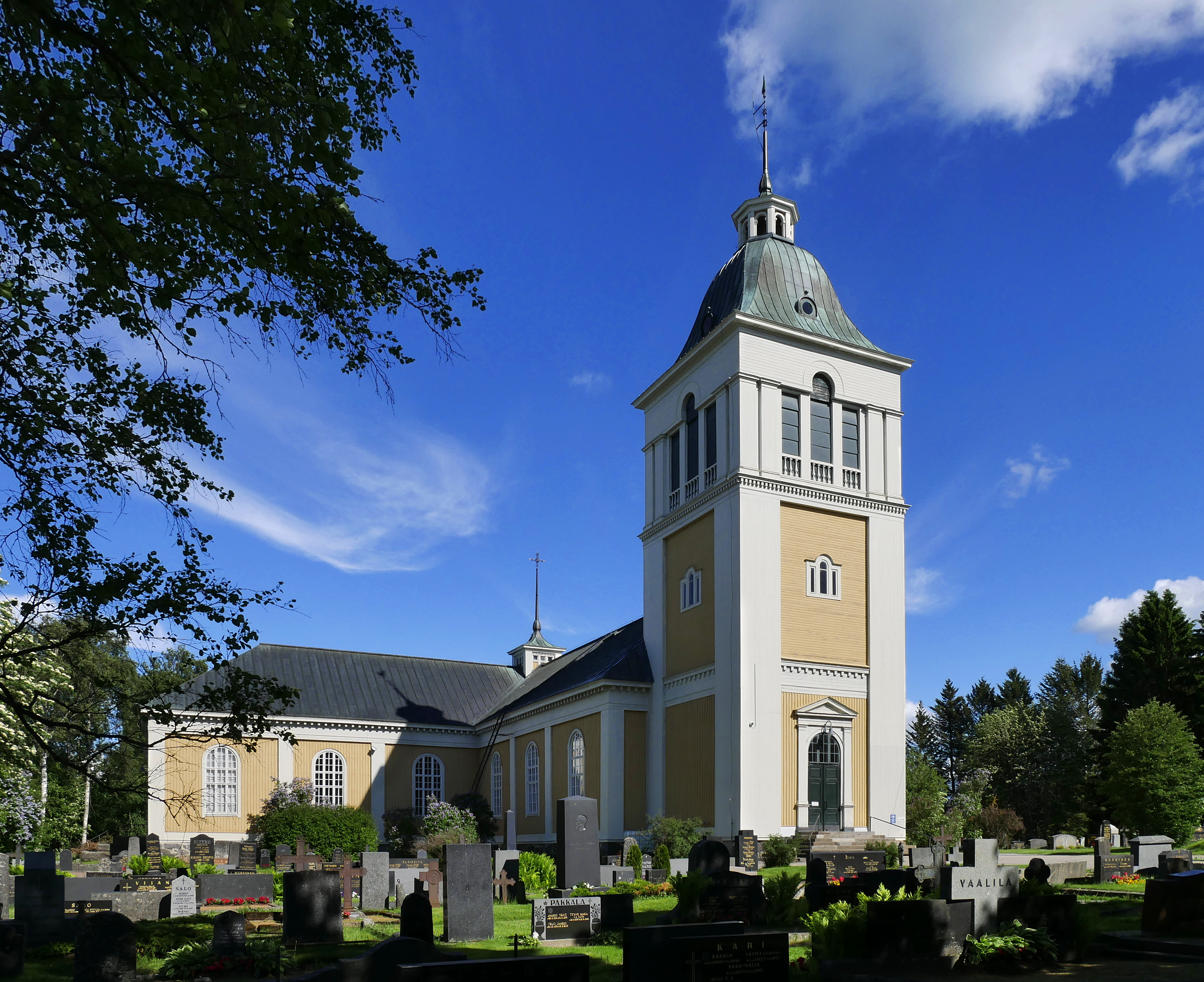
- Laihia Church

- Coat of arms

- Location of Laihia in Finland
- Interactive map of Laihia
- Coordinates: 62°58.5′N 022°00.5′E
- Country: Finland
- Region: Ostrobothnia
- Sub-region: Vaasa
- Charter: 1576

Government
  - Municipal manager: Jari Rantala

Area (2018-01-01)
  - Total: 508.44 km^{2} (196.31 sq mi)
  - Land: 505.16 km^{2} (195.04 sq mi)
  - Water: 4.14 km^{2} (1.60 sq mi)
  - Rank: 172nd largest in Finland

Population (2025-12-31)
  - Total: 8,020
  - Rank: 122nd largest in Finland
  - Density: 14.91/km^{2} (38.6/sq mi)

Population by native language
  - Finnish: 96.6% (official)
  - Swedish: 1.2%
  - Others: 2.2%

Population by age
  - 0 to 14: 19.8%
  - 15 to 64: 56.7%
  - 65 or older: 23.5%
- Time zone: UTC+02:00 (EET)
  - Summer (DST): UTC+03:00 (EEST)
- Website: laihia.fi

Laihia (Swedish: Laihela) is a municipality of Finland, founded in 1576 through a separation from Isokyrö and Korsholm.

It is located in the Ostrobothnia region. The municipality has a population of 8,020 (Jul 31, 2020) and covers an area of 508.44 square kilometres (196.31 sq mi) of which 4.14 km^{2} (1.60 sq mi) is water. The population density is 14.91 inhabitants per square kilometre (38.6/sq mi). Laihia consists of 37 villages.

Laihia is within the economical region of the neighbouring city Vaasa. The municipality is unilingually Finnish. Only 93 people speak Swedish as a native language. Most inhabitants speak Finnish or a dialect typical of this region. The municipal manager is Juha Rikala. There are a total of 469 farms in the municipality..

Laihia is located along the international tourist route Blue Highway, which goes from Norway to Russia via Sweden and Finland.

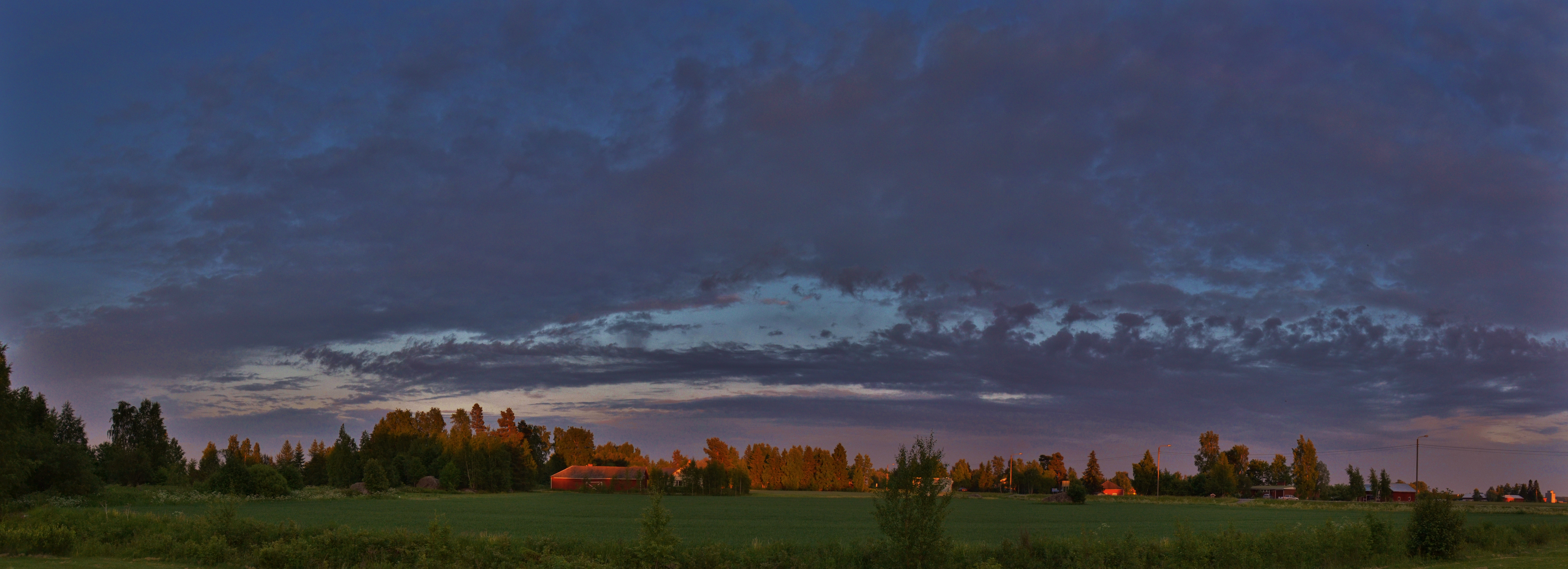
Landscape in Laihia

== People ==
In Finland, Laihians are renowned for their stinginess (Finnish: nuukuus, saituus, itaruus, piheys or kitsaus) and there are hundreds of jokes told about them. However, Laihians are not usually offended by it. To the contrary, they are proud of their frugality and even have a Museum of Stinginess (Nuukuuren museo). In any case, Laihia has high-level public services for education, health, sports, seniors etc.

=== Notable people ===
- Santeri Alkio, politician and journalist
- Mark Hoppus (born 1972), American singer and musician, of Finnish descent through great-grandparents who emigrated from Laihia
- Toivo Kärki, musician
- Matti Vanhala, Bank of Finland Governor 1998–2004
- Keijo Suila, former CEO of Finnair
- Johan Laibecchius (born in Laihia on 19 March 1658), vicar
- Kristian Chyraeus (died in Laihia in 1687), vicar
- Samuel Backman (died in Laihia 3 April 1712), vicar
- Jonas Lagus (died in Laihia 22 April 1798), vicar and dean
- Sara Siipola (born in Laihia 1997), singer

=== Surnames ===
The most common surnames in Laihia and their frequencies as of 2014:

1. Kallio (1:112)
2. Puska (1:121)
3. Kinnari (1:135)
4. Koskela (1:137)
5. Luoma (1:142)
6. Niemelä (1:142)
7. Kauppi (1:145)
8. Mäkinen (1:156)
9. Mäkelä (1:159)
10. Kankaanpää (1:163)

== Transport ==
The private coach company OnniBus route Helsinki—Seinäjoki—Vaasa has a stop at Laihia.
