= The Normandy =

Apartment building in Manhattan, New York

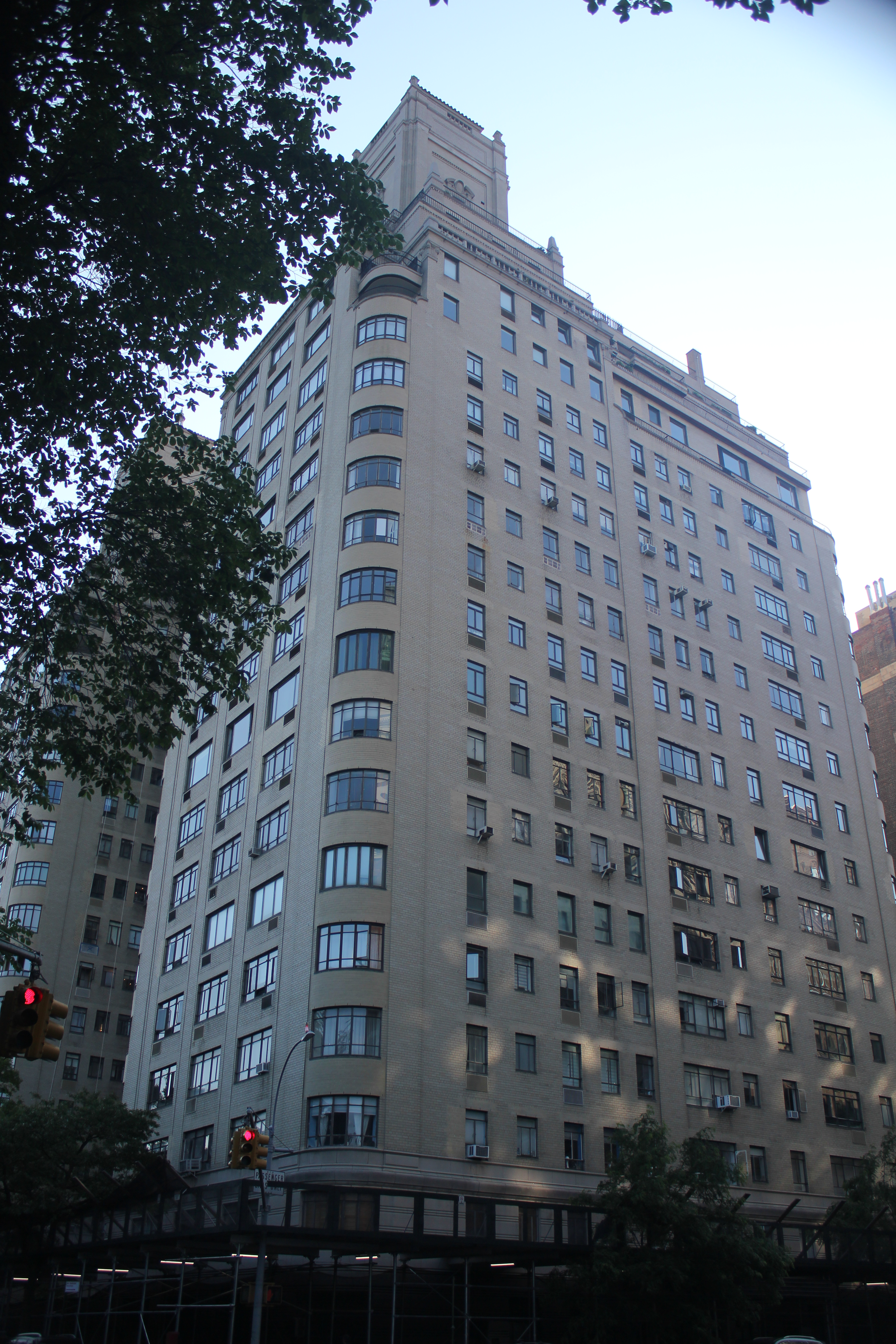
- The Normandy as seen from the corner of 86th Street and Riverside Drive in 2022
- Interactive map of the The Normandy area

General information
- Architectural style: Art Moderne, Renaissance Revival
- Location: 140 Riverside Drive, New York City, United States
- Coordinates: 40°47′24.6″N 73°58′47.4″W
- Construction started: August 1938
- Opened: September 1, 1939

Technical details
- Floor count: 20

Design and construction
- Architect: Emery Roth
- Developer: Henry Kaufman, Emery Roth, Samson Rosenblatt, and Herman Wacht

Other information
- Public transit: Subway: 1 train at 86th Street

New York City Landmark
- Designated: November 12, 1985
- Reference no.: 1568

The Normandy is a cooperative apartment building at 140 Riverside Drive, between 86th and 87th Streets, adjacent to Riverside Park on the Upper West Side of Manhattan in New York City, United States. Designed by architect Emery Roth in a mixture of the Art Moderne and Renaissance Revival styles, it was constructed from 1938 to 1939. The building was developed by a syndicate composed of Henry Kaufman, Emery Roth, Samson Rosenblatt, and Herman Wacht. The Normandy is 20 stories tall, with small twin towers rising above the 18th story. The building is a New York City designated landmark.

The lowest 18 stories of the building are H-shaped, flanking courtyards to the west and east. There are numerous setbacks, some of which double as terraces. The first two stories are clad in rusticated blocks of limestone, with horizontal Art Moderne-style horizontal grooves. There are two semicircular entrances at ground level. The remainder of the facade is made of light brick with cast stone ornamentation, as well as movable windows and curved corners. The building has a sunken lobby leading to two elevator banks. On the upper stories, there were originally 250 apartments, each with two to seven rooms. The rooms are generally more compact than in earlier luxury apartment buildings, with many rooms arranged around central galleries. There is a double-level penthouse suite in each tower with seven rooms.

The building, possibly named for the French ocean liner SS Normandie, replaced twelve row houses built in the late 1890s. Plans for the Normandy apartment building were announced in August 1938; the building opened in September 1939 and was the last major apartment house developed on the Upper West Side before World War II. The Normandy was resold in 1944, 1952, and 1960. The building was converted to a housing cooperative in 1979 following a failed conversion attempt in 1971. The building was designated as a city landmark in 1985 amid a controversy over window replacements.

== Site ==
The Normandy is at 140 Riverside Drive on the Upper West Side of Manhattan in New York City, United States. The building occupies the eastern sidewalk of Riverside Drive, across from Riverside Park between 86th Street to the south and 87th Street to the north. The Normandy is situated on an L-shaped land lot with an area of 28,700 square feet (2,670 m^{2}). The lot measures 200 feet (61 m) along Riverside Drive, 125 feet (38 m) along 86th Street, and 160 feet (49 m) along 87th Street. The surrounding area contains row houses, as well as apartment buildings such as the Red House on 85th Street.

After the completion of Riverside Drive in the late 19th century, row houses were built on and near it. The site of the Normandy was occupied by twelve row houses that were built in 1896 by Henry Cook. These were composed of eight houses at 140–147 Riverside Drive, three at 348–352 West 87th Street, and 351 West 86th Street. Traffic engineer John A. Harriss acquired the house at 140 Riverside Drive in 1910. This house had contained a log cabin, chapel, and ballroom. Harriss's firm Rivercrest Realty acquired six of the adjacent houses in 1918. Rivercrest bought the remaining houses by 1921, and Harriss planned to build an apartment building on the site. The plans never materialized and the Metropolitan Life Insurance Company took over the buildings in 1933.

== Architecture ==
The Normandy was designed by Emery Roth in an Art Moderne style (not to be confused with a modern style). Roth avoided characterizing the Normandy as a modern-style building, in the belief that "every building is modern when erected". Original plans had called for the building to be designed in an Italianate style. Some Italianate details are retained in the final design, such as pilasters with ornate capitals; parapets with balustrades; and a pair of small "towers" above the main building. The facade shares several Art Moderne elements with Roth's earlier 888 Grand Concourse apartment building, including curved "pavilions" and recessed entrance vestibules.

=== Form ===
The Normandy is 20 stories tall. The main section of the building rises 18 stories. These stories are roughly arranged in an "H" shape, with two pavilions, or wings, which flank courtyards both to the west and the east. The eastern section of each pavilion contains setbacks. The street-facing walls of each pavilion's eastern section have setbacks starting at the 15th story, while the inner faces of each pavilion have setbacks beginning at the ninth story. A two-story tower rises above both the building's northern and southern ends; each tower contains one penthouse apartment. The towers' presence may have been inspired by Roth's previous designs, which contained towers for mechanical equipment and water tanks.

The courtyards have a total area of 9,000 square feet (840 m^{2}). According to The New York Times, the courtyards were landscaped by a "horticultural expert from Cornell University". The west courtyard is slightly recessed from Riverside Drive and is separated from the street by a wrought-iron and stone railing with urns. (Note: The center portion of the railing is made of wrought-iron. The extreme north and south ends contain stone balustrades, which end at urns on either side of the wrought-iron railing.) The rear or east courtyard is larger, with dimensions of 80 by 100 feet (24 by 30 m). The presence of the courtyards allowed every apartment to receive natural light from two frontages. Apartments in the center of the "H" received natural light from both courtyards. Roth included these courtyards because he believed residents wanted suburban features such as "a pleasant outlook, not bleak walls and windows".

The massing of the Normandy, and those of similar buildings, was shaped primarily by the Multiple Dwelling Act of 1929. Under this legislation, the "street walls" of apartment buildings could rise one and a half times the width of the adjacent street before they had to contain a setback. On lots of more than 25,000 ft^{2} (2,300 m^{2}), the street walls could rise three times the width of the adjacent street. Apartment buildings could rise up to 19 stories; additional stories were allowed on large plots, but the floor areas of these stories were limited to 20 percent of the lot area. The Normandy was the only apartment building on Riverside Drive to be designed with twin towers. This contrasted with the multiple twin-towered buildings on Central Park West (namely the Century, the Majestic, the San Remo, and the El Dorado).

=== Facade ===
The Normandy's facade contains decorative detail on all of its elevations. The base, towers, and parapets are made of beige-colored cast stone and limestone; the rest of the facade is made of beige brick. The Normandy's fenestration consists of multi-paned sash windows, as well as vertical pilasters and horizontal courses.

Roth paid particular attention to the designs of the windows, which were manufactured in pieces and assembled to his precise specifications. Most of the windows originally carried a uniform design, with glass panes separated by metal muntins. The widest windows were triple-casement windows, composed of a central tier with five panes, as well as an upper and lower tier with three stationary transoms. In the central tier, the middle pane was stationary, while the other four panes were movable casements. In addition, there are double-paired casement windows, each with four movable panes, and single-paired casement windows, each with two movable panes. The facade's curved corners contain casement windows. Each of the corner windows is divided vertically into five sections (three stationary panes, two movable casements). Though the glass itself is not curved, each vertical window section is set at a slight angle to give the appearance of a curve.

==== Base ====
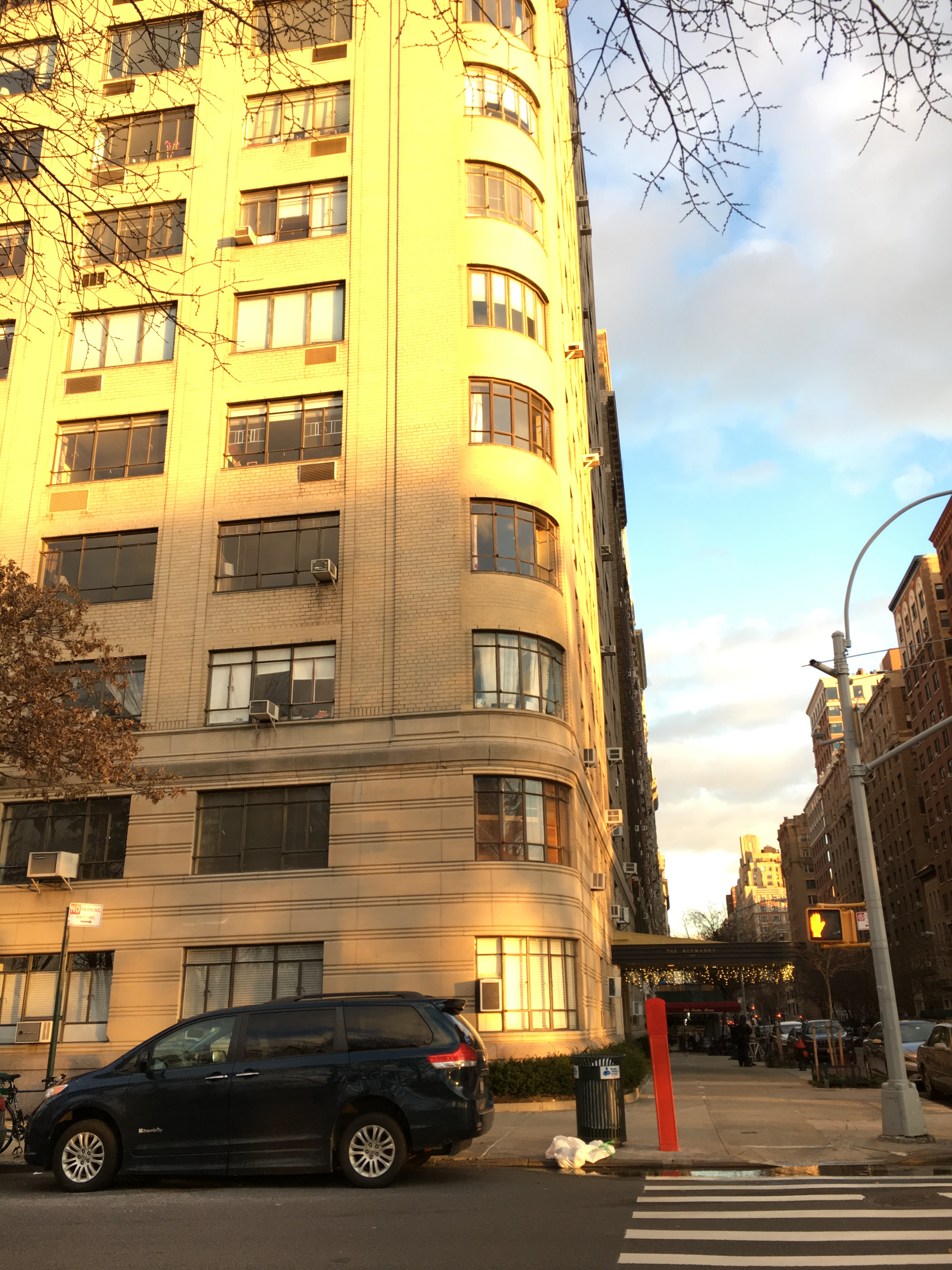
View of the Riverside Drive elevation at 86th Street. The lowest two stories contain rusticated blocks of limestone, separated by groups of three horizontal grooves. Above the second story, pilasters divide the Riverside Drive elevation vertically into bays.

The lowest section of the facade, immediately above the sidewalk, consists of a cast-stone water table with a horizontal ovolo molding at its top. Above the water table is the two-story base, which is made of rusticated blocks of limestone. The rustication consists only of horizontal grooves, unlike in earlier buildings that also had vertical grooves; this was one of several Art Moderne elements in the building. Each horizontal course of blocks is separated by three shallow grooves, and the limestone blocks themselves contain horizontal markings. A torus-shaped molding runs horizontally above the base. The two-story rusticated base extends across the 86th Street and Riverside Drive elevations, as well as the western section of the 87th Street elevation. On the remainder of the 87th Street elevation, the rusticated blocks are only one story high and there is no torus molding. On all elevations, the arrangement of the second-story windows follows that of the stories directly above.

The two main entrances on 86th and 87th Streets are connected by a passageway. Near the western end of the 86th Street elevation is a recessed semicircular entryway, with a curved canopy projecting over the sidewalk. The lowest section of the entryway's wall is a cast-stone dado, above which are blue, beige, and gold mosaic tiles in horizontal and vertical patterns. The center of the entryway contains a revolving door. The recessed entryway is flanked by two bronze doors, leading to individual offices on the ground floor. Similarly, the western end of the 87th Street elevation contains a recessed entryway flanked by two bronze doors to individual offices. On the far western end of the 86th and 87th Street frontages, there is a short standalone wall of rusticated blocks, which contains an archway with a metal service gate.

There are no doors on the Riverside Drive elevation, though it does contain multi-pane sash windows, which are recessed directly into the rusticated base. The arrangement of the first- and second-story windows largely follows that of the stories directly above the base. The center of the Riverside Drive elevation is recessed and contains a glass wall (dating from 1983), which is surrounded by a cast-stone frame.

==== Intermediate stories ====
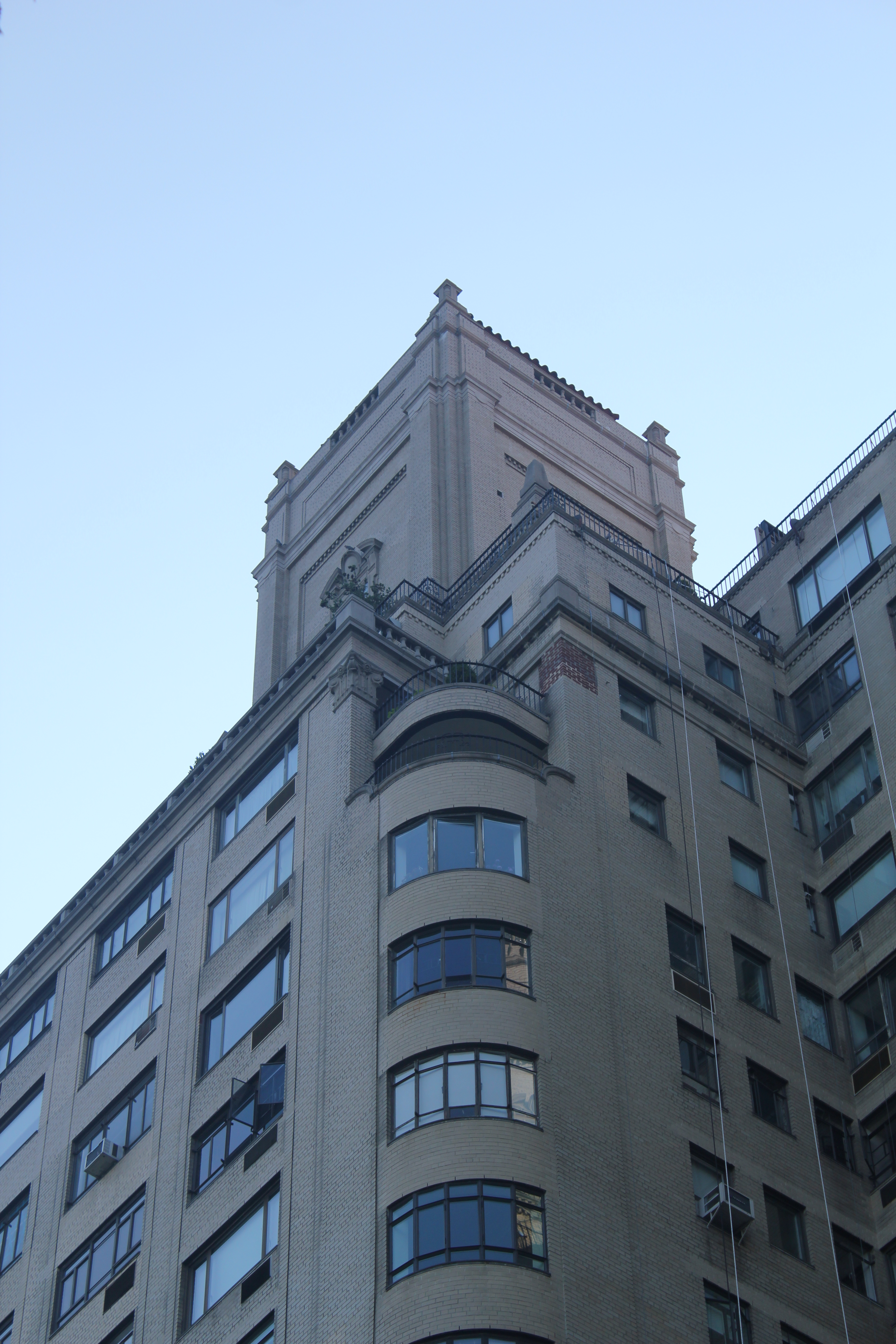
Top of a curved corner on Riverside Drive

On Riverside Drive, both the northern and southern pavilions are divided vertically into three bays from the 3rd to the 17th stories. The bays are flanked by brick pilasters. The outermost pilasters rise above stone blocks (set within the band course above the second story) and are topped by Ionic capitals. Each bay contains one triple casement window per floor. A parapet runs above the 17th story of each pavilion. On either side of each pavilion are curved corners with slightly recessed windows on the 3rd through 15th floors. Each corner contains curving terraces at the 16th and 17th floors; those on the 17th floor are cantilevered. The returns of each pavilion, facing the recessed courtyard, contain three windows per floor. In the midsection, each of the 3rd through 18th stories contains a uniform pattern of casement windows. (Note: The center of the midsection's facade has four single-casements, flanked by one triple-casement on each side. To the left (north) is a double-casement, while to the right (south) is a single-casement and a double-casement.) Above the 19th-story penthouse, the midsection is topped by a parapet with corbels.

On the 86th Street elevation, three brick pilasters split the 3rd through 17th stories into two asymmetrical sections, each with five bays of windows. The pilasters flanking the westernmost five bays have Ionic capitals. In the western section, each of the 2nd through 17th stories contains four bays of single-paired casement windows and one bay of smaller windows. (Note: The smaller windows consist of tripartite windows with upper transoms only.) On the 16th and 17th stories, the westernmost bay of windows is offset because these stories contain different apartment layouts. In the eastern section, the second and ninth stories contain a slightly different window layout from the 10th to 15th stories. (Note: Each of the second through ninth stories contains two triple-casement windows, two single-paired casement windows, and one smaller window (not necessarily in that order). On the 10th to 15th stories, the western bay of triple-casement windows is supplanted by two additional bays of single-casement windows.) The 16th to 18th stories of the eastern section are set back. The eastern corner of the 86th Street elevation is also curved. The windows are recessed slightly.

The 87th Street elevation contains a recessed midsection flanked by curved corners. The westernmost five bays are flanked by pilasters like those on 86th Street. Each of the 2nd through 17th stories contains four bays of single-paired casements and one bay of smaller windows, while the 18th and 19th stories are set back. The corner windows on this elevation are more sharply curved than those on Riverside Drive; the center pane is angled 45 degrees from the two panes on either side. The midsection contains three casement windows per floor. In the easternmost five bays, the second to ninth stories contain a different window layout from the 10th to 15th stories, and the eastern section of the 16th and 17th stories is set back. (Note: The second through ninth stories each have a short window, a vertical "slit window", a single casement, a double casement, and a triple casement from right to left. The 10th to 14th stories have five single-casement windows. At the 16th and 17th story, there is a single casement, a double casement, and a setback from right to left.)

On the rear elevation, facing east, the pavilions at the north and south ends of the building flank a deeply recessed midsection. Each of the pavilions contains five bays of casement windows. The northern pavilion on 87th Street is deeper; the windows on that pavilion only begin above the tenth floor due to the presence of a neighboring townhouse.

==== Upper stories and towers ====
Above all elevations, there are setbacks starting above the 16th story, as well as windows with broken pediments. These setbacks contain parapets, which highlight the vertical dimensions of the building's small towers. At the 18th and 19th stories, there are angular obelisks at the corners of the parapets.

The Normandy's towers, which contain brick facades with cast-stone ornamentation, rise above the 18th story of either pavilion. Each tower's corners are flanked by clusters of piers. On the north, west, and south elevation of each tower are blind window openings, which contain a wall instead of a window; these openings are surrounded by frames with cartouches. The eastern elevation of each tower has a chimney. The towers are also decorated with denticulated panels and glass-block walls. The walls of each tower are topped by a balustrade with obelisks at each corner. Each tower contains a further setback with blind openings on all sides. Above is a tiled hip roof, which contains a lantern-shaped finial at its peak. According to the New York City Landmarks Preservation Commission (LPC), the towers give the effect of Italian campaniles.

=== Features ===
The passageway between the 86th and 87th Street entrances is known as the "garden loggia". It is designed in the Art Moderne style. There are four large windows on Riverside Drive, separated by fluted piers. The steps from each entrance to the lobby are made of green marble, and the lower parts of the walls are also wainscoted in green marble. The ceiling is separated at regular intervals by fluted beams with cove lighting. Throughout the lobby are torcheres with simple designs inspired by classical elements. The Normandy is served by six high-speed elevators, which are grouped into two banks at the north and south ends of the lobby. On the upper stories, double-loaded corridors lead from the elevators to each apartment (unlike in the Beresford and the San Remo, where elevator banks led to foyers directly outside the apartments).

==== Apartments ====
When the Normandy was built, it was arranged with 250 apartments, each with two to seven rooms. There were 1,060 rooms in total. Each story contained up to 15 apartments. Some of the three-room suites were arranged as duplexes, with one bedroom on the upper level and the living room and kitchen on the lower level. In contrast to earlier structures on Central Park West, there were few maids' suites, except in apartments with six or seven rooms. Conversely, apartments generally had large closets; for instance, a unit with four or five rooms typically had six or seven closets.

Common rooms such as the living room were arranged around a central gallery. Unlike in older buildings, the Normandy had circular foyers, which measured 14 to 16 feet (4.3 to 4.9 m) across. Rooms were typically smaller than those in the Beresford or San Remo, (Note: According to Ruttenbaum 1986, p. 175, the maximum room dimensions were as follows: Entrance galleries: 14 by 24 ft (4.3 by 7.3 m); Dining rooms: 13 by 23 ft (4.0 by 7.0 m); Master bedrooms: 12 by 18 ft (3.7 by 5.5 m)) and the ceilings measured up to 10 feet (3.0 m) high. There were dining rooms only in the larger apartments. Most units contained dinettes, small dining niches that were physically separated from the kitchens; many of the dinettes are curved. Even though it was economically infeasible to install dining rooms in most units, Roth believed that every resident needed a dining space that was large enough for guests. There was a bathroom adjacent to every bedroom, as well as standing showers in the larger apartments. In some units, there were square bathtubs oriented on a diagonal axis, which were referred to as "neo-angle".

There were two duplex penthouse suites, one within each of the towers; each suite contained seven rooms. The lower level of each suite contain a foyer measuring about 20 by 9 feet (6.1 by 2.7 m). Leading off each foyer were a living room, dining room, a library with a separate bathroom, and a kitchen with a maid's room. (Note: According to Ruttenbaum 1986, p. 176, the dimensions of the rooms in each penthouse were as follows: Living room: 17 by 27 ft (5.2 by 8.2 m); Dining room: 16 by 18 ft (4.9 by 5.5 m); Library: 14 by 16 ft (4.3 by 4.9 m); Kitchen: 12 by 12 ft (3.7 by 3.7 m); Master bedroom: 12 by 20 ft (3.7 by 6.1 m); Secondary bedroom: 11 by 16 ft (3.4 by 4.9 m)) The two levels of each suite were connected by curved staircases enclosed in glass-brick shafts. On the upper level were two bedrooms, two bathrooms, and a dressing room. On both levels of both suites, there were terraces on three sides. Each suite's ceilings measured 11 to 12 feet (3.4 to 3.7 m) high. Both suites included wood-burning fireplaces with carved-wood and marble mantels. The fireplaces were inefficient and outdated at the time of their construction, and Roth did not want to build fireplaces in the other apartments, since they would require the construction of chimneys, which he thought were unsightly. Roth nonetheless included the fireplaces in the two penthouses for what he described as sentimental reasons.

== History ==
Several high-rise apartment buildings were developed on the Upper West Side in the 1920s, in anticipation of the completion of the New York City Subway's Eighth Avenue Line, which opened in 1932. The main impediment to the development of high-rise housing on Riverside Drive was the presence of the New York Central Railroad's West Side Line through Riverside Park. Demand for luxury housing in Manhattan had declined significantly during the Great Depression. During the late 1930s, the railroad line was placed in a tunnel under Riverside Park, which was landscaped and extended to the Hudson River shoreline. Following the completion of this project, developers were attracted to the area around the park.

=== Development ===
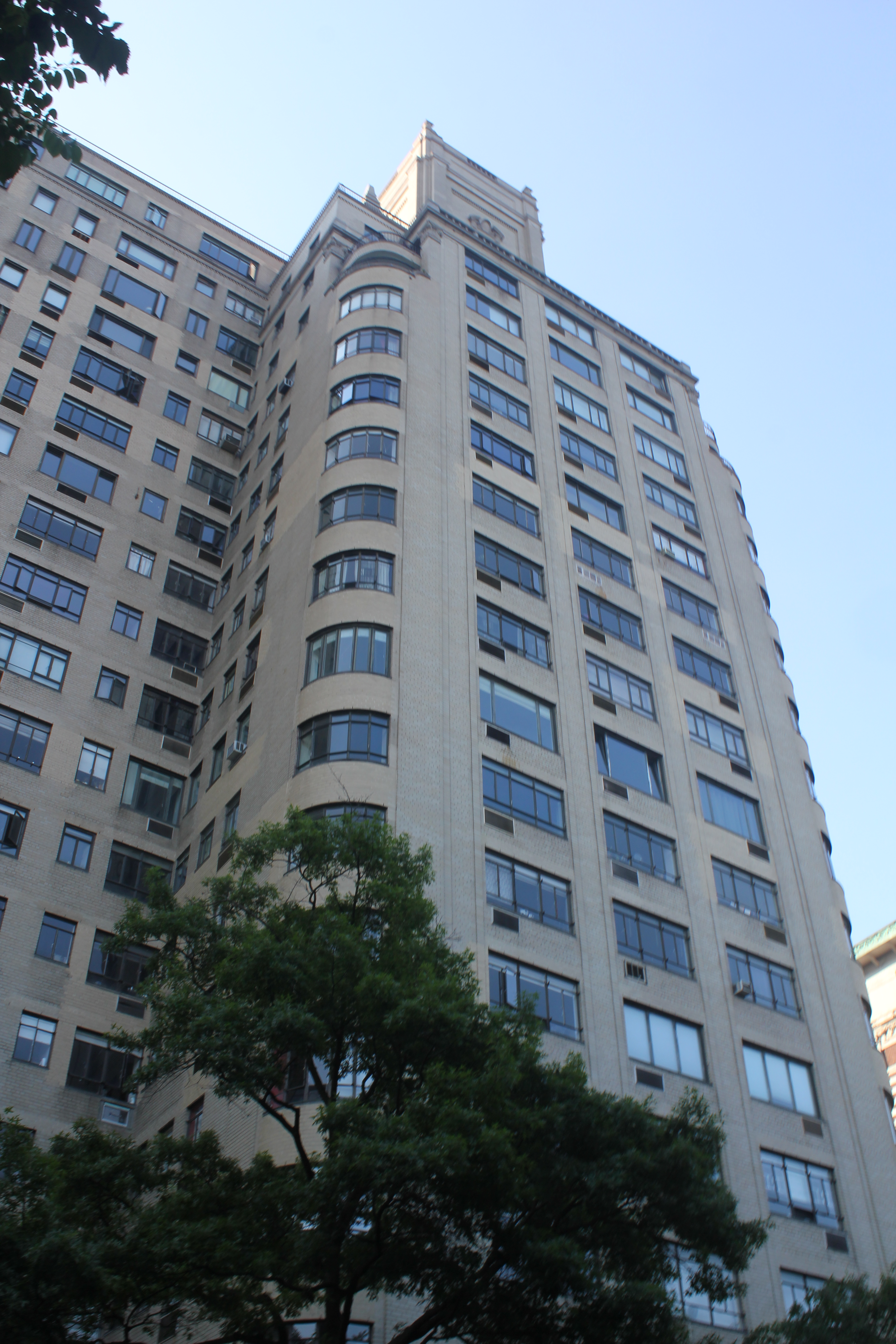
Southern pavilion on Riverside Drive

In August 1938, Metropolitan Life sold Harriss's houses to a syndicate composed of developers Henry Kaufman, Emery Roth, Samson Rosenblatt, and Herman Wacht. This was described as the largest privately funded acquisition of vacant buildings in New York City since the beginning of the Depression. The syndicate funded the purchase with a $3.3 million loan from Metropolitan Life; it planned to build an 18-story apartment building with 242 units and a combined 1,000 rooms. According to the syndicate, the new development's design would be based on Roth's previous San Remo and Beresford apartment buildings. Later the same month, Roth's firm filed plans for an apartment building at 140 Riverside Drive, which would be erected by 140 Riverside Drive Inc. at a cost of $1.45 million. It was the Upper West Side's largest development in several years, as well as the only large apartment building being constructed in that area.

The city's building department rejected Roth's original plans in September 1938, and the city's board of appeals upheld the rejection two months later. As a result, Roth submitted new plans with smaller balconies and more prominent Art Moderne design elements. By early 1939, the building was known as the Normandy. The building's name may have come from the SS Normandie, a French ocean liner built in 1935. Although the Normandie made her maiden voyage in July 1938, the month before the apartment building was announced, Roth never publicly confirmed the connection between the apartment building and the ocean liner. About half of the apartments had been rented by July 1939. Annual rents ranged from $1,000 for two-bedroom apartments to $5,500 for the two tower suites. Within the next month, the building was nearly completed, and 75 percent of the suites had been leased.

=== Rental house ===
The first apartments were ready for occupancy by September 1, 1939, and the building's apartments were 89 percent rented by the end of the year. Among the building's first tenants was Finnish diplomat T. O. Vahervuori, as well as script writers Arnold M. Auerbach and Herman Wouk. By that time, Roth was 69 years old and was close to retirement. The Normandy was the last large apartment house that Roth designed, as his firm Emery Roth & Sons mainly worked on office buildings after World War II. It was also the last luxury apartment building completed on the West Side before the war. Samson Rosenblatt, acting on behalf of his partners, sold the Normandy in March 1944 to a syndicate led by Julius Perlbinder. At the time, the building reportedly had a long waiting list of potential tenants. Herbert Charles & Co. assumed responsibility for leasing apartments at the building.

In June 1952, Perlbinder sold the building to an unnamed group of investors, who paid entirely in cash and assumed a $2.5 million mortgage on the property. The New York Times said at the time that the building was "one of the largest and best-known apartment houses on the drive". The same year, a New York state judge ruled that the Normandy's operators had to reinstate a room in the basement "for the acceptance of delivery parcels" after the operators had tried to reduce the number of staff in the building. Normandy Associates, headed by A. Gochalk and Albert Eltingin, acquired the Normandy in 1960 from the Normandy Company, subject to a mortgage of $3.3 million. At the time, the building had 253 units. All apartments were rent-regulated, being either rent-stabilized or rent-controlled.

=== Cooperative conversion ===
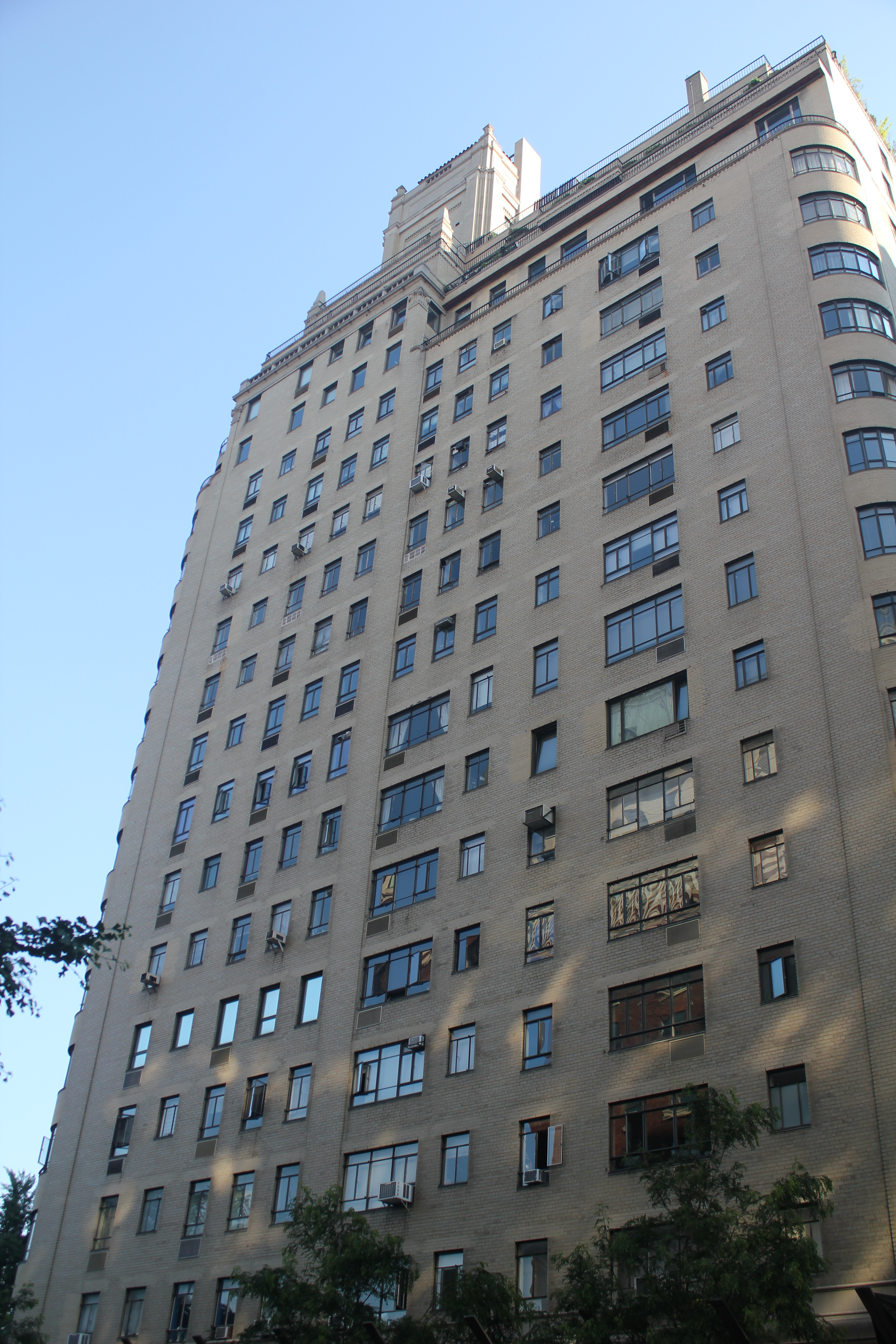
View from 86th Street

The Normandy's owners proposed converting the building to a cooperative apartment house in 1971. As part of the offering, the apartments would be sold at prices ranging from $6,462 for two-room units to $70,500 for the penthouse duplexes; the monthly maintenance costs would range from $83 to $906. The Normandy was finally converted to a co-op in 1979. Following the cooperative conversion, its residents published a monthly newsletter and sponsored tours of each other's apartments. According to one long-time resident, the building became "a small town" after the conversion, whereas "nobody knew anybody" when it was a rental house.

During the mid-1980s, the Normandy employed an in-house architect to review proposed renovations to the building. In September 1985, the co-op board voted to replace the existing casement windows, which were leaking, and to create holes in the facade for air conditioners. Several tenants objected to the proposed modifications, citing esthetic concerns and the high cost of the plan. Later that month, the LPC scheduled a public hearing to discuss the possibility of designating the Normandy as a New York City landmark, thereby restricting the scope of modifications to the facade. Some tenants replaced their windows even as the LPC continued to discuss the landmark designation. The LPC designated the Normandy as a city landmark on November 12, 1985. Immediately afterward, the New York Landmarks Conservancy requested an injunction against further window replacements. Within a week of the landmark designation, the Conservancy and the Normandy's board established an agreement on the replacement of the windows. A 1992 letter to The New York Times claimed that the LPC had forced tenants to use steel-framed windows, which cost 50 percent more than aluminum-framed windows.

Another controversy emerged in the late 1990s, when the owner of the adjacent five-story House of Free Russia at 349 West 86th Street announced plans to demolish that building, replacing it with a 15-story condominium tower. Many residents of the Normandy opposed the demolition. A member of the board alleged that the condo development would block the views of over 100 apartments. The Normandy's lawyers said that an existing covenant prevented any "tenement flat or apartment house" from being built at 349 West 86th Street, but a New York Supreme Court judge found that the Normandy itself violated the same covenant. In January 1999, the Normandy's board paid $1.35 million for the air rights above 349 West 86th Street, thus preventing that house from being expanded.

== Impact ==
The AIA Guide to New York City described the building as having "sinuous curves". In 1978, architecture critic Paul Goldberger commented in The New York Times:

the Roth firm took on modernism slowly – the Normandy apartments of 1938 at 140 Riverside Drive have an Art Deco-like base, but the ornamental housing for the water tower lurches back suddenly to the Italian Renaissance. There were a few other such schizophrenic [Roth] designs from the 1930s and buildings such as 930 Fifth Avenue and 875 Fifth Avenue of 1940 show a gradual disappearance of the old ornament.

In 1986, historian Steven Ruttenbaum wrote: "The Normandy is very much a child of the Beresford and the San Remo, yet it is like one that has suffered mild deprivation at austere times." According to Ruttenbaum, the mixture of Art Moderne and Italian Renaissance elements created "a graceful and unique composition which is at once conservative and forward-looking". Anthony Robins wrote in a 2017 book: "Perhaps the Normandy is best thought of as neither Renaissance nor Moderne – but, simply, as Emery Roth."

== Notable residents ==
- Hans Holzer

== See also ==
- List of New York City Designated Landmarks in Manhattan from 59th to 110th Streets
