= ESUS (disambiguation) =

ESUS may refer to:

- Esus, a Gaulish god
- Embolic stroke of undetermined source
- English-Speaking Union Scotland, a Scottish educational charity
- Elite Specialist Undercover Squad, a fictional organization in the TV series Supply & Demand

== See also ==
- Esu (disambiguation)
