= McDonald brothers (gangsters) =

Gangsters from London

Charles 'Wag' McDonald and Wal McDonald were brothers who led the Elephant and Castle Mob, a London street gang active in the early 20th century. Bert McDonald, their other brother, was the boyfriend of Forty Elephants leader Alice Diamond.

== Background ==
Wag and Wal were close friends with Birmingham Boys leader Billy Kimber, their gangs allied and both warring with Charles Darby Sabini, who eventually removed their gang from London. In about 1927, Wag’s brother, Bert, and Billy Kimber also went to America after they had fired shots through the door of the ‘Griffin’, a drinking club used by the Sabinis.

Wag McDonald fled to Canada to avoid arrest after the Epsom Road Battle in 1921. From there he moved to Los Angeles, where he became a bodyguard to Charlie Chaplin and later to Jack Dragna, the city’s Mafia boss.

The McDonald brothers were prominent leaders of the Elephant and Castle gang between the two World Wars. Charles (Wag) McDonald was born on February 5, 1877, at Valentine Place, Lambeth, southeast London. He became leader of the Elephant gang after discharge from the army in 1918 when he set up a string of illegal street bookmaking pitches across south London and the West End, particularly Soho, where he came in to conflict with the West End Boys led by Matt and Mike McCausland. The McCauslands were driven out of the West End in a series of street battles and later joined Alf White’s King’s Cross gang.

Wag was a close friend of Birmingham racecourse gangster Billy Kimber, who had lived with the McDonald family in York Street, Lambeth, in the 1910s. When racecourses re-opened after World War I, Kimber came into conflict with East London gangsters led by Dodger Mullins and central London gangs led by Darby Sabini, Alf Solomon and Alf White, who wanted a share of lucrative pickings gained by forcing race cards and unnecessary services on bookmakers, including the sale of pitches and stools to stand on.

When Darby Sabini formed an alliance with Alf Solomon’s gang and Alf White’s King’s Cross gang, Kimber responded by forming a powerful alliance between his Birmingham gang, the Elephant and Castle gang, George (Brummie) Sage’s Camden Town gang and Freddie Gilbert’s Finsbury Boys. The result was a series of battles on racecourses, in the streets, and in London’s night clubs for protection rights. The fighting continued into the 1930s when racecourses became better regulated.

When the Birmingham gang, on an occasion led by Wag McDonald, ambushed and battered a coach full of Leeds bookmakers, who had lent their support to Darby Sabini, resulted in the gaoling of many of Kimber’s gang, Wag fled to Canada to escape arrest, travelling to Los Angeles, where he set up an agency to protect and escort movie stars. Wag became personal bodyguard to Charlie Chaplin. Later, he became chief minder to Los Angeles Mafia boss, Jack Dragna. That story is recounted from his diaries in ‘Elephant Boys – Tales of London and Los Angeles Underworlds’, written by his nephew Brian McDonald.

In Wag’s absence, leadership of the Elephant Gang went to Walter (Wal) McDonald, who defeated the Sabini gang, led by Harry Sabini, at the ‘battle of Ham Yard’ near Piccadilly in 1927. Wal was born on January 1, 1883, in Lambeth, and continued as leader until Wag returned from the United States after killing the man who had murdered his brother, Bert, in the gang wars that beset Dragna’s gang. Bert had fled to America with Billy Kimber to join up with Wag after they had fired shots at Sabini gangsters. Kimber returned to London after killing a man in Phoenix, Arizona, in a fight over a gambling debt. Albert (Bert) McDonald was born in 1889. He often led the fighting arm of the Elephant gang and had a reputation as a troublesome fellow, always looking for a fight. He had been a short-term boyfriend of Alice Diamond, who had followed Mary 'Polly' Carr as Queen of the Forty Thieves, renamed by Bert as the Forty Elephants, because of their close connection to the Elephant and Castle district of southeast London. He was murdered in Los Angeles in September 1929.

Ada McDonald, sister of the McDonald boys, became a premier receiver of stolen goods. According to Detective Superintendent George Cornish of Scotland Yard, she provided services for five major London gangs, including the Forty Elephants. She specialised in fencing expensive furs for remodelling by East End tailors. She was never convicted and died in 1967.

Another brother, Arthur James (Jim) McDonald, supported his brothers in their battles and later worked for Soho gang leader Jack Spot. Jim McDonald was the father of author Brian McDonald, who uncovered the histories of the Elephant and Forty Elephants gangs and brought to public attention largely forgotten gangsters such as Billy Kimber, Darby Sabini, Alf Solomon, Alf White, Johnny Phillips, Freddie Gilbert, George (Brummie) Sage, Dodger Mullins and Tommy Benneworth.

Wag and Wal McDonald died within the same month of October 1940 and were buried in Streatham Cemetery.
