= McDonald Brothers =

McDonald Brothers may refer to:

- Richard and Maurice McDonald who developed McDonald's fast food system and sold golden arches to Ray Kroc
- McDonald Brothers (architects), in Louisville, Kentucky, U.S.A.
- McDonald brothers (gangsters) (died 1940), English mobsters
- McDonald Brothers and Co., former name of Macdonald Tobacco, a firm in Montreal, Quebec, Canada
- McDonald brothers (priests), Irish priests active in the early Catholic Church in New Zealand
- McDonald Brothers, Canadian aircraft manufacturing company that became Bristol Aerospace

== See also ==
- MacDonald Brothers (active from 1981), a Scottish family of pipers and folk musicians
- The MacDonald Brothers (active from 2006), a Scottish pop folk duo who competed in The X Factor
