= Wartiovaara =

Wartiovaara is a Finnish surname. Notable people with this name include:

- Anu Wartiovaara (born 1966), Finnish bioscientist
- Jonathan Wartiovaara (1875–1937), Finnish politician
- Otso Wartiovaara (1908–1991), Finnish diplomat
- Tapio Wartiovaara (1909–1940), Finnish sports shooter
