= William Kimber (disambiguation) =

William Kimber was a musician and dancer.

Billy or William Kimber may also refer to:

- Billy Kimber (gangster), real-life head of the Birmingham Boys
- Billy Kimber, in the UK period crime drama TV series Peaky Blinders, played by Charlie Creed-Miles; based on the real Billy Kimber
