= Mikko Iipponen =

Finnish farmer and politician (1849–1934)

Mikko Iipponen (12 February 1849 – 24 November 1934) was a Finnish farmer and politician, born in Laihia. He was a member of the Parliament of Finland from 1911 to 1916, representing the Finnish Party.
