= Birmingham Boys =

Street gang

- Founded: c. 1910
- Founded by: Billy Kimber
- Founding location: Birmingham, England
- Years active: c. 1910–1930
- Territory: Northern England, The Midlands, and some neighbourhoods in London
- Ethnicity: English
- Membership (est.): 25-30
- Criminal activities: Bookmaking, assault, extortion, fraud, murder, fencing, hooliganism, bribery, smuggling, hijacking and robbery
- Allies: Elephant and Castle Mob and Hoxton Gang, CWS
- Rivals: Sabini gang

The Birmingham Boys (also known as the Brummagem Boys or the Brum Boys) were a street gang whose power extended from the North of England to London's underworld between the 1910s and 1930s. They lost control of the South East racecourses to the Sabini gang. In modern times they gained recognition due to the TV series Peaky Blinders.

== History ==
=== Origin ===
Following the Gaming Act 1845, the only gambling allowed in England was at race tracks. The introduction of special excursion trains meant that all classes of society could now attend the new racecourses opening across the country. Cash was concentrated in the hands of bookmakers, who employed bodyguards against protection gangs operating within the vast crowds.

William "Billy" Kimber, born 1882 in Summer Lane, Aston in Birmingham, a brass caster by trade, was head of the Birmingham Boys. With gangs in Uttoxeter and Leeds he controlled racecourses in the Midlands and the North. For several years Kimber was probably the biggest organised crime boss in the UK. He set up a secondary base in Islington, North London to concentrate on the racetracks in the South of England, teaming up with London gang boss Charles 'Wag' McDonald.

Kimber formed alliances with smaller organisations such as the Hoxton Gang and the Elephant and Castle Mob. Now at racecourses in the South East, one group the Brummies began to prey on were the Jewish bookies from London's East End, who turned to local underworld boss Edward Emmanuel, who in turn recruited the Italian Sabini Gang as protection.

In March 1921, the Brummagems ambushed Sabini at Greenford Park Trotting Track. A few days later, Kimber was found shot and beaten in Kings Cross, London, having gone to visit Sabini but survived. The violence escalated, but Sabini gained the upper hand when 23 Birmingham boys were locked up following the "Epsom Road Battle". In October 1940, Kimber was the president of the Devon and Cornwall Bookmakers' Association. William Kimber died 63, in 1945, after a prolonged illness, at the Mount Stuart Nursing Home, Torquay.

=== Epsom Road Battle ===
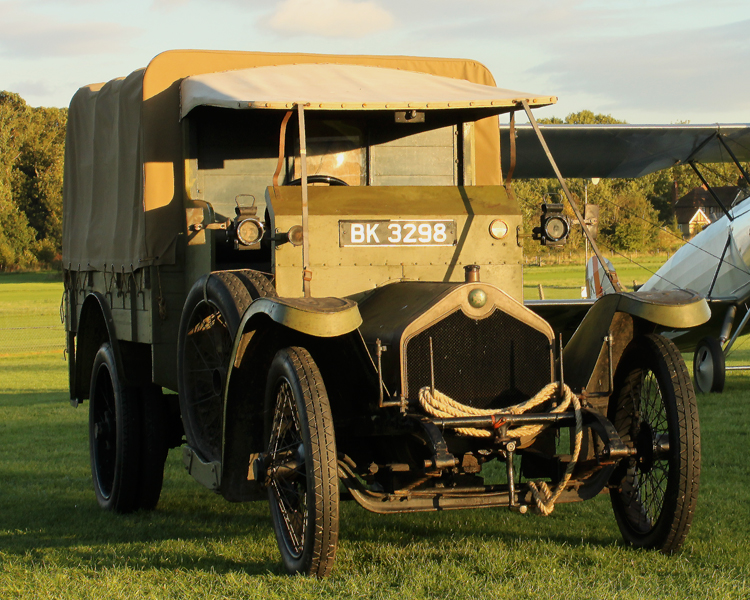
Crossley 20/25 Tender (1919)

Kimber's gang believed that a group of Leeds bookmakers travelling in a Crossley tender at Ewell, near Epsom, on Coronation Cup day were in fact the Sabini Gang. The tender was rammed by a taxi, and 60 men set upon the occupants with hatchets, hammers, and bricks. The attack was led by a man with a revolver, and initial reports suggested it was a Sinn Féin riot. The gang had used taxis and a blue motor coach to both follow their victims and escape. The police located the coach at the George and Dragon pub (now the Kingston Lodge Hotel) on Kingston Hill and were able to muster 50 officers.

== In popular culture ==
In the BBC television series Peaky Blinders a fictionalised version of Billy Kimber was portrayed by Charlie Creed-Miles.
