= Edith Cole =

British stage actress

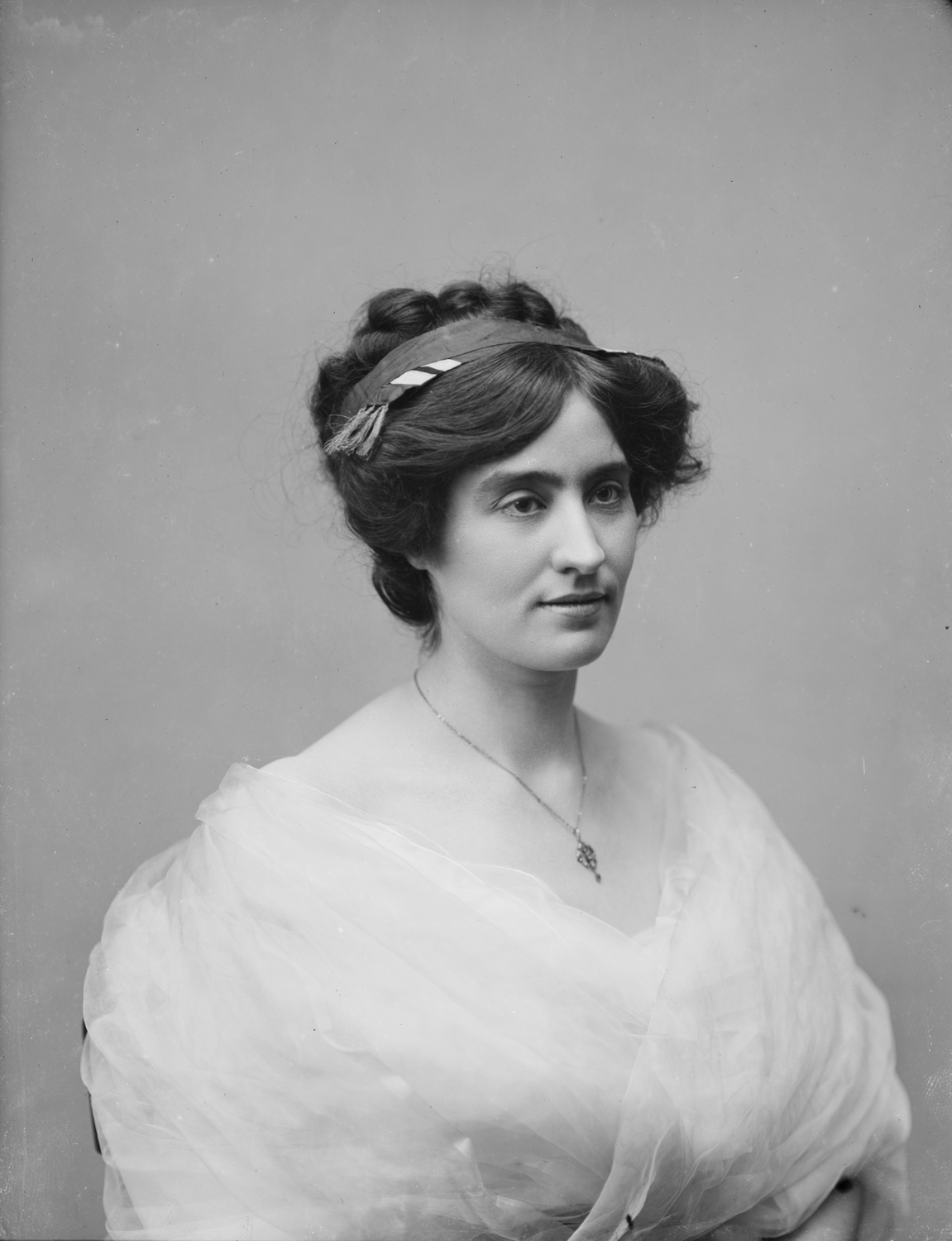
- Born: Edith Julia Cole; 27 May 1870
- Died: 7 June 1927 (aged 57); Birkenhead
- Occupation: Actress
- Spouse: William Wallace Kelly (m. 1898)

Edith Cole (27 May 1870 – 7 June 1927) was a British stage actress and animal welfare activist.

== Career ==
Cole was born on 27 May 1870 in England, the daughter of Charles Cole. She made her stage debut in December 1889 at the Drury Lane Theatre as a housemaid in the pantomime Jack and the Beanstalk. She appeared as Marianne in an 1894 revival of The Two Orphans at the Adelphi Theatre.

One of her most successful roles was as Josephine in the Napoleonic drama A Royal Divorce by W. G. Wills, and she reprised her role many times over the years. The play was promoted by impresario William Wallace Kelly, Cole's husband, and was his most successful production. Kelly was proprietor of the Shakespeare Theatre in Liverpool. A Royal Divorce is mentioned repeatedly by James Joyce in Finnegans Wake, and it is likely Joyce saw Cole's performance. Another success for Cole was her role as Frances Vere in The Worst Woman in London (1903). She also wrote and appeared as Margaret Rossiter Strickland in The Fires of Youth (1919).

Cole was an ardent anti-vivisectionist and animal welfare promoter. She and her husband opened the "Edith Cole Home for Dogs" in Liverpool for the National Canine Defence League. She wrote a book, Scarlet and Grey in 1915 and donated the proceeds to the Blue Cross to assist horses wounded during World War I.

== Death ==
Cole died on 7 June 1927 in Birkenhead as a result of burns sustained after she cleaned a pair of gloves with petrol. She left £4,240 in her will.
