= Maggie Hill =

British mobster

Margaret Lily Hill (1898 – 1949) was an English career criminal, linked to organised shoplifting. Born in Marylebone, London, she was the sister of notorious gangster Billy Hill who rose to prominence in the London underworld during the interwar years.

== Forty Elephants ==
During the interwar years she received notoriety as one of the leaders of an all female gang of criminals known as the Forty Elephants who specialised in shoplifting. This gang was notable for its longevity and skill in avoiding police detection.

== Personal life ==
Hill's parents were Septimus James Hill and Amelia Sparling, who had married in 1895. Her mother was born in Dublin, Ireland. Hill was a close friend of Eddie Guerin, famous for being the lover of Chicago May. Her sister was Dorothy 'Dolly' Mays, another of the Forty Elephants. According to Brian McDonald, Maggie Hill married career criminal Alfred Hughes in 1915, and they were sometimes convicted together. Most of her convictions are listed under the name Maggie Hughes. She was violent and unmanageable by all except Alice Diamond. Her last known prison sentence was in 1939 when she received three years for attacking two women with broken bottles, causing one of them to lose an eye. She died in 1949 at age 50 in Marylebone. Her place of burial is unknown.
