= Lorraine Gamman =

British design professor (born 1957)

Lorraine Patricia Gamman (born July 1957) is professor of design at the Design Against Crime Research Lab at Central Saint Martins in the University of the Arts, London which she founded in 1999.

Her recording of the oral history of professional shoplifter Shirley Pitts as part of her PhD kindled her interest in oral history and lead to her book Gone shopping: The story of Shirley Pitts, Queen of thieves (1996). The book was subsequently republished by Bloomsbury. In 2012, Tiger Aspect acquired an option via Peters Fraser and Dunlop, literary agent for the book, on the television and film rights. Duncan Campbell ranked Gone Shopping third in his Guardian selection of the ten best true-crime books in 2019 and it has been referenced in academic studies.

In 1999, Gamman founded the Design Against Crime (DAC) research initiative at Central Saint Martins. Building on her earlier research into crime, gender and consumer culture, DAC brought together design researchers, practitioners and crime prevention specialists to investigate how design could reduce opportunities for crime, working collaboratively with local government, policymakers, industry and communities. Its work subsequently expanded into socially responsive and participatory design, including projects concerned with criminal justice, prison education/engagement and rehabilitation.

Gamman has curated and co-curated numerous exhibitions exploring the relationship between design, crime prevention and social innovation. Her most recent exhibition, Making Time: Every Prison a Creative Hub (2024), co-curated with Rex Gardner, showcased creative projects developed with people in prison.

The publications listed below reflect the breadth of Gamman’s academic interests, including feminist cultural studies, design and crime prevention, participatory design, and creative practice in criminal justice.

== Selected publications ==
- The female gaze. The Women's Press, 1988. (With Margaret Marshment) ISBN 0704341093
- Female fetishism: A new look. Lawrence & Wishart, 1994. (With Merja Makinen) ISBN 0853157553
- Gone shopping: The story of Shirley Pitts, Queen of thieves. Signet/Penguin, 1996. ISBN 0451182588 (2nd edition 2012)
- Dirty Washing – The Hidden Language of Soap Powder Boxes, Design Museum 2001 (With Sean O’Mara).
- Built Environment: Sustainability via Security: A New Look, 35 (3), 2009. (Co-edited with Rachel Armitage). ISSN 0263-7960
- Theft of customers’ personal property from cafes and bars. Problem-Oriented Guides for Police, Problem- Specific Guides Series, Guide no. 60. U.S. Department of Justice, Centre for Problem Oriented Policing, 2010. (With Kate Bowers, Shane Johnson, Loreen Mamerow and Anna Warne). ISBN 978-1-935676-15-7
- CoDesign - International Journal of CoCreation in Design and the Arts, 7 (3-4). Special Issue on Socially Responsive Design, 2011. (Co-edited with Adam Thorpe) ISSN 1571-0882
- Tricky design: The ethics of things. 2018. (Joint editor with Tom Fisher) ISBN 978-1474277181
- Creative Justice: Redesigning Criminal Justice through Rehabilitative, Restorative, and Regenerative Arts Practices. Palgrave Macmillan. Forthcoming: January 2027. (Co-edited with Laura Caulfield)

Gamman has written many journal articles (too numerous to list here) including:

- Co-designing Social Change – Reviewing Some Methods and Tools, 2024. (With Francesco Mazarella) In: DISCERN: International Journal of Design for Social Change, Sustainable Innovation and Entrepreneurship, 5(2), pp. 91–95.
- The Emotional Labour of Making Selves, Making Futures: Ethics of Care in Participatory Design Practice for Transformational Change, 2027 (With Francesco Mazarella). Design and Culture.

Some of the chapters in books she has written include:

- Reviewing Queer Viewing – The Gaze Revisited (With Caroline Evans), 1995. In: A Queer Romance: Lesbians, Gay Men and Popular Culture (Eds. P. Burston and C. Richardson), Routledge. ISBN 9780415096188
- Visual Seduction and Perverse Compliance: Reviewing Food Fantasies, Hidden Appetites and ‘Grotesque’ Bodies, 2000. In: ‘Fashion Cultures’ (Eds. S. Bruzzi and P. Gibson), Routledge. ISBN 9780415206860
- Self-fashioning and the shoe: what’s at stake in Female Fetishism or Narcissism, 2001. In ‘Footnotes: On Shoes’ (Eds. Suzanne Ferris and Shari Benstock), Rutgers University Press. ISBN 9780813528717
- Criminality and creativity: what’s at stake in designing against crime? (With Adam Thorpe) In: Design Anthropology: Object Culture in the 21st Century. Springer, New York/Vienna, pp. 52-67, 2010. ISBN 9783709102336
- Reviewing the art of crime - what, if anything, do criminals and artists/designers have in common? (With Maziar Raein) In: Cropley, D. et al (Eds.) The Dark Side of Creativity. pp. 155–177. Cambridge: Cambridge University Press 2010. ISBN 9780521139601
- Reducing Handbag Theft, 2012. (With Paul Ekblom, Kate Bowers, Aiden Sidebottom, Chris Thomas, Adam Thorpe and Marcus Willcocks). In: Ekblom, P. (Ed.) Design Against Crime: Crime Proofing Everyday Objects. Crime Prevention Studies 27. Boulder, Col.: Lynne Rienner. ISBN 9781588268136
- Female Slenderness and the Case of Perverse Compliant Deception - or Why Size Matters... In: Fashion Cultures Revisited: Theories, Explorations and Analysis. Routledge, pp. 296–304, 2013. ISBN 9780415680066
- Could Design Help to Promote and Build Empathic Processes in Prison? Understanding the Role of Empathy and Design in Catalysing Social Change and Transformation. (With Adam Thorpe) In: Transformation Design: Perspectives on a New Design Attitude. Board of International Research in Design, 2015. Birkhäuser/ BIRD, pp. 83-100. ISBN 978-3-0356-0653-9
- Design for Empathy – why participatory design has a contribution to make regarding facilitating restorative values and processes, 2016. (With Adam Thorpe) In: Gavrielides, T. (Ed.) Offenders No More: New Offender Rehabilitation Theory and Practice. NY: Nova Science Pub. ISBN 978-1-63483-681-4
- What is “Socially Responsive Design and Innovation”?, 2015. (With Adam Thorpe) In: Fisher, F. and Sparke, P. (Eds.) Routledge Companion to Design Studies. Abingdon, Oxon: Routledge. ISBN 9781138780507
- Is Nudge as good as We Think in Designing Against crime? Contrasting Paternalistic and Fraternalistic Approaches to Design for Behaviour Change, 2018 (With Adam Thorpe) pp 216–234. In: Kristina Niedderer, Stephen Clune, Geke Ludden (Eds) Design for Behaviour Change: Theories and practices of designing for change (Design for Social Responsibility). ISBN 9781472471987
- Made in Prison: Understanding Knowledge Exchange, Co-design and Production of Cell Furniture with Prisoners to Reimagine Prison Industries for Safety, Well-being and Sustainability, 2022. (With Laura Caulfield) In: Moran, D., Kennison, P. and Caulfield, L. (eds.) The Palgrave Handbook of Prison Design. Cham: Palgrave Macmillan, pp. 733–767.
- On Games and Gamification: Understanding What’s at Stake in Co-Designing with Prisoners, 2024. In: Gardner, A. and Caulfield, L. (eds.) Arts in Criminal Justice and Corrections: International Perspectives on Methods, Journeys and Challenges. London and New York: Routledge.
- Crafting Identities: Imagining Futures through Making and Co-Creation with Prisoners, 2026. (With Claire Swift) In: Fashioning Change through Making. London: Routledge.
