= Mäki =

Origin
- Language: Finnish
- Meaning: "hill", from mäki ("hill")
- Region of origin: Finland

Other names
- Variant forms: Mäkinen, Mäkelä

Mäki is a Finnish surname of Laine type meaning "hill". Notable people with the surname include:

- Jaakko Mäki (1878–1938), Finnish politician
- Joni Mäki (born 1995), Finnish cross-country skier
- Kristiina Mäki (born 1991), Finnish-Czech runner
- Matti Mäki (born 1982), Finnish swimmer
- Mika Mäki (born 1988), Finnish racing driver
- Olli Mäki (1936–2019), Finnish boxer
- Reijo Mäki (born 1958), Finnish writer of crime fiction
- Taisto Mäki (1910–1979), Finnish long-distance runner
- Tauno Mäki (1912–1983), Finnish sport shooter
- Teemu Mäki (born 1967), Finnish artist
- Tomi Mäki (born 1983), Finnish ice hockey player

== See also ==
- Mägi, an Estonian surname with the same meaning ("hill")
- Maki (disambiguation)
