= The Worst Woman in London =

1899 English play

- Original language: English
- Written by: Walter Melville

Premiere
- Date: 23 October 1899
- Place: Standard Theatre, London

The Worst Woman in London is an 1899 English melodrama play about a manipulative female criminal, written by Walter Melville, and first staged by Melville and his brother Frederick at the Standard Theatre in London. It was highly popular particularly in the early years of the 20th century.

== Inspiration ==
It been alleged to be inspired by Mary Carr, leader of "The Forty Elephants" a notorious gang of female criminals operating in Britain. The more immediate influence was the melodrama "Dangerous Women", by F.A. Scudamore, (Note: Born as Fortunatus August Davis; he would later add "Scudamore" to his name".) which the Melville brothers had produced in 1898.

The Worst Woman in London was the first in a series of similar melodramas put on by the Melville brothers, all based around femme fatale characters and free-minded women protagonists produced by the Melville brothers. Following the conventions of English melodrama of the time, the play alternated between scenes of overwrought drama and comic buffoonery.

== Synopsis ==
The play deals with the beautiful femme fatale, Frances Vere (played by Olga Audré) whose goal is to obtain wealth and position through blackmail, murder, arson and robbery. She has many lovers (one of which she seduces into marriage and shoots to death). The play also features a daring escape by an overhead telephone pole wire by Vere. In her climactic caper, Vere disguises herself as a man to avoid arrest, further playing with gender roles to heighten the transgressive villainy of the female lead.

== Plot ==
Frances Vere arrives with Lord Milford to act as the governess to his daughter Ruth. Ruth is engaged to marry Jack Felton, who is dismayed to recognize Vere as the woman whom he had an affair with in Paris and who incited him to murder another man.

Vere blackmails Felton because of this murder if he does not do what she wants she will tell Ruth of his being a murderer. Ruth eventually does find out, but she leaves with Jack.

In the absence of Ruth, Vere seduces Lord Milford and they marry, he even changes his will in favor of his new wife. But he soon finds out the truth and changes his will leaving everything to Ruth. Learning about this Vere and Milford have an argument which leads to her shooting him to death in his bed.

Next she goes after Ruth who stands between her and Milfords fortune. Ruth and Jack have become members of a circus troupe and lives in a tenement. Vere sets the tenement on fire hoping to kill Ruth.

Vere while escaping the angry mob, reveals that she is in fact a woman to the surprise of the crowd. At which Jack Felton exclaims that she is indeed a woman - "the worst woman in London"

== Characters ==
- Frances Vere
- Old Milford. nobleman and father of Ruth
- Ruth Milford, daughter of Old Milford
- Jack Felton, romantic interest of Ruth Milford, who was in the past seduced by Frances Vere
- Philip Armstrong
- Vincent Lyle, accomplice of Frances Vere
- Matilda, a maid
- Inspector Curzon of the Yard
- Bob Newton
- Bank Clerk
- Lugubrious Fireman
- Young fireman

== Productions ==
Its premiered in 1899 at Standard Theatre with Edie Duggan playing the lead character, other known actresses to have taken on the role was Edith Cole

It performed on Broadway in 1903, with Nora Dunblane in the title role, and adapted for TV in 1965 starring Lynn Taylor. It was also produced on BBC as part of their Gaslight Theatre feature.

== Reception ==
The 1903 production of "The Worst Woman in London" which opened in West End, was met with great reviews from critics and hailed as "the greatest success of the season" with the protagonist being described as a woman "who has great worldly desires, but little of the wealth necessary for their satisfaction, and so she exercises her power of fascination to gratify her love of luxury."

"The Worst Woman in London is not so bad as we are led by the title to believe. She has many redeeming features about her and she commands applause. The piece is an English creation. All who admire the impossible in drama will be pleased by the Worst Woman."

George Bernard Shaw commented that one the arrival on stage of the anti-heroine Frances Vere, the actress was met by the public with "a deafening chorus of groans and hisses, but they admire her superb taste in dress, her resource, and daring career".

== See also ==
- The New Woman, a novel by Bolesław Prus
