= Maiju Hirvonen =

Finnish football player (born 1990)

Personal information
- Date of birth: 25 December 1990 (age 35)
- Position: Defender

Senior career*
Years	Team	Apps	(Gls)
- HJK

International career
	Finland	3	(0)
- * Club domestic league appearances and goals

Maiju Hirvonen (born 25 December 1990) is a retired Finnish footballer. Lindstrom spend most of her career at HJK. Since retiring from professional football she is the head coach of Tikkurilan Palloseura.

== International career ==
Maiju Hirvonen was also part of the Finnish team at the 2009 European Championships. Maiju Hirvonen was a late replacement in the squad for Heini Mäkelä who injured her calf.
