= Shirley Pitts =

English shoplifter and fraudster

Shirley Pitts

Shirley Sally Pitts, later Shirley Sally Hawkins (24 November 1934 – 16 March 1992), was an English fraudster and thief known as the "queen of shoplifters". Born into poverty and crime, she began to steal as a child to feed her siblings. She was educated in shoplifting by the Forty Elephants crime syndicate, also known as the Forty Thieves, and later diversified into other non-violent crime such as fraud.

When Pitts died of breast cancer, she was given an elaborate funeral in south London attended by family and criminal acquaintances that received national media coverage in Britain. The flowers included a six-foot-long arrangement that said "Gone shopping".

== Early life and family ==
Pitts was born in south-east London, in Lambeth Walk, Lambeth, to Harry Pitts, who died in Parkhurst Prison in 1962, and Nell Taylor, an alcoholic. One brother, Henry "Adgie" Pitts, became a bank robber who died aged 29 in a car crash. She disowned another brother, Charlie, after he took part in a kidnap plot, for which he received a 15-year jail sentence.

By the age of seven, Pitts was stealing milk and bread to provide food for her five siblings, after her mother sold their ration books and her father was imprisoned. She was evacuated to Yorkshire during the Second World War and spent her teenage years in reform schools. She was taught how to shoplift by the Forty Thieves, an all-female group of thieves founded in the Victorian era that persisted into the 1950s.

Pitts had several relationships, which produced seven children by three fathers. Five children were from her relationship with Chris Hawkins, who ran a fruit-and-vegetable stall in Hoxton market. Hawkins beat her but stopped after a warning from the Kray twins. After he died, she adopted his name.

== Career ==
By her early twenties, Pitts was one of the foremost shoplifters in Britain, running teams of "hoisters" that operated nationally. High-class shops in the West End of London were her main target, in particular Harrods, Harvey Nichols, and Selfridges, as these could supply her with the expensive clothes that she enjoyed wearing and that she could use to make a living. She also operated on continental Europe, taking teams of thieves to Paris and Geneva.

Pitts used seven or eight aliases. Her shoplifting techniques included disguising herself using different wigs, stuffing stolen goods under her voluminous skirts, and the use of "magic bags": carrier bags lined with tin foil that prevented the detection of security tags when she left a shop with stolen goods. When she had finished with one shop she would sometimes leave the stolen goods in a car outside and enter another shop to see what she could steal.

She was jailed three times and spent a total of three years in prison. She was one of the few women to escape a British prison by leaving a van that was taking her to court, ostensibly so that her daughter would not be born in prison. She prided herself on never informing or being involved in violence.

== Death and legacy ==
Pitts died of breast cancer on 16 March 1992. After a blessing at the Roman Catholic Church of the Assumption in Chigwell, she was buried at Lambeth Cemetery in a £5,000 blue Zandra Rhodes dress that the popular press speculated she may have stolen but that her friends insisted was bought. Her remains are interred in a plot near that of her brother Henry. Mourners were driven from her home in Chigwell, Essex, in a fleet of cars that included 15 black Daimlers. The great train robber Buster Edwards attended and messages of condolence were sent by the Kray twins and Ronnie Knight. Tributes were paid at the graveside to the fact that Pitts "never grassed" (informed). A floral tribute played on the words that she would use when she went to work, "Gone Shopping". She left an estate that was valued for legal purposes at less than £125,000 and was probably much less.

In the last years of her life she began to dictate her reminiscences to Lorraine Gamman. These formed the basis for Gamman's biography of Pitts, titled Gone shopping: The story of Shirley Pitts, Queen of thieves, which was published in 1996 by Signet/Penguin (2nd, Bloomsbury, 2012).

== See also ==
- Alice Diamond (1896–1952), Queen of the Forty Thieves
