= Niemelä =

Niemelä is a Finnish surname. Notable people with the surname include:

- Aarne Ilmari Niemelä (1907–1975), Finnish chess player
- Esu Niemelä (1921–1999), Finnish farmer and politician
- Artturi Niemelä (1923–2021), Finnish homesteader and politician
- Virpi Niemelä (1936–2006), Finnish Argentine astronomer
- Pekka Niemelä (born 1974), Finnish ski jumping coach and former ski jumping
- Markus Niemelä (born 1984), Finnish race car driver
- Mikko Niemelä (born 1990), Finnish ice hockey defenceman
- Joonas Niemelä (born 1997), Finnish ice hockey forward
