= Nora Dunblane =

American actress and short story writer (born 1879 – fl. 1915)

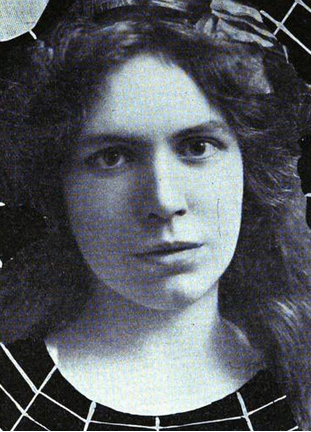
- Nora Dunblane, from a 1900 publication
- Born: 1879; New York City, New York, United States
- Other names: Norah Dunblane
- Occupation(s): actress, romance writer

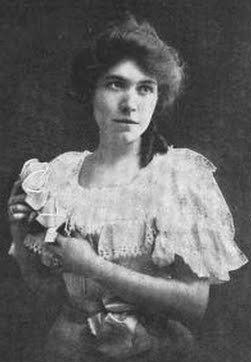
Nora Dunblane, from a 1901 publication

Nora Dunblane (born 1879 – fl. 1915) was an American actress and short story writer.

== Early life and education ==
Nora Dunblane was born in Brooklyn. She attended Miss Rounds' School and the American Academy of Dramatic Arts (graduating in 1899), and was involved with the Brooklyn Cantata Club.

After graduating, she was active in the American Academy of Dramatic Arts alumni society, and served on its library committee in 1904, with elocutionist Helena Zachos.

== Stage career ==
Dunblane was a "clever young American actress" on Broadway at the turn into the 20th century, often seen in soubrette roles. Dunblane's stage credits included roles in Cyrano de Bergerac (1898) with Richard Mansfield, Hearts are Trumps (1900), The Cuckoo (1900), Her Majesty (1900), Lovers' Lane (1901), Her Atonement (1899 and 1901), The Worst Woman in London (1903), Much Ado About Nothing (1903), His Sister's Shame (1903), and Don Carlos (1905).

In 1900, she performed in an all-star benefit at Carnegie Hall, raising funds for Roman Catholic orphanages.

== Writing ==
Dunblane was a writer during and after her acting days. Her short fiction, often romance stories, appeared in magazines and newspapers, with titles including "The Girl in the Bookshop" (1903), "Beating the Game" (1907), "Studio Number Six: The Story of a Musician" (1907), "Romance at Ryerson's" (1908), "Two Ways of Love" (1912), "Love's Command" (1913), "Otilla's Triumph" (1914), "The White Gardenia" (1915), "The Girl Who Was Charming" (1915), and "Jasmine's Decision" (1915).

== In culture ==
The band Tommy McClymont & The Panacea Jamband recorded a song, "Nora Dunblane", about the actress, on their album May the Ladies Treat You Kindly (2016). (McClymont is from Dunblane, Scotland, and was inspired to write the song by a photograph of the actress.)
