= Antti Mäkilä =

Finnish ice hockey player

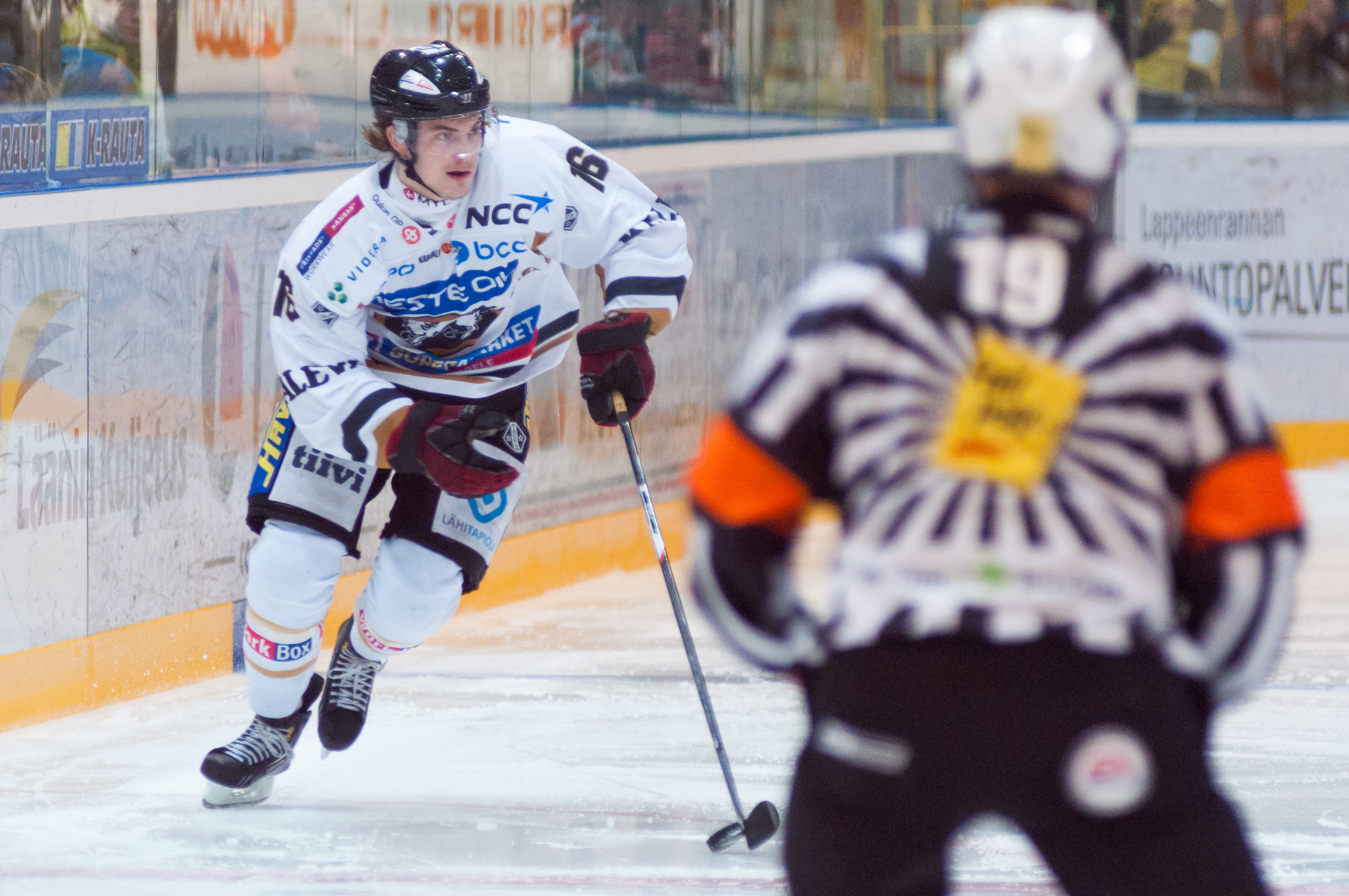
- Born: April 1, 1989 (age 36) Pori, Finland
- Height: 6 ft 3 in (191 cm)
- Weight: 203 lb (92 kg; 14 st 7 lb)
- Position: Forward
- Shot: Right
- Played for: Ässät; LeKi; Oulun Kärpät; HC Satakunta; KooKoo
- Playing career: 2008–2016

Antti Mäkilä is a Finnish retired ice hockey forward.

== Career statistics ==
			Regular season					Playoffs
Season	Team	League	GP	G	A	Pts	PIM	GP	G	A	Pts	PIM
2004–05	Porin Ässät U16	U16 SM-sarja	21	11	16	27	2	7	3	4	7	2
2005–06	Porin Ässät U18	U18 SM-sarja	35	9	15	24	18	8	4	6	10	0
2006–07	Porin Ässät U18	U18 SM-sarja	13	4	9	13	12	—	—	—	—	—
2006–07	Porin Ässät U20	U20 SM-liiga	27	2	3	5	8	—	—	—	—	—
2007–08	Porin Ässät U20	U20 SM-liiga	42	10	28	38	30	12	4	10	14	0
2008–09	Porin Ässät U20	U20 SM-liiga	25	12	23	35	59	11	3	12	15	8
2008–09	Porin Ässät	SM-liiga	14	0	1	1	4	—	—	—	—	—
2008–09	Suomi U20	Mestis	2	0	1	1	0	—	—	—	—	—
2009–10	Porin Ässät U20	U20 SM-liiga	7	2	10	12	10	1	0	1	1	0
2009–10	Porin Ässät	SM-liiga	47	2	4	6	16	—	—	—	—	—
2010–11	Porin Ässät U20	U20 SM-liiga	8	3	2	5	12	—	—	—	—	—
2010–11	Porin Ässät	SM-liiga	28	2	5	7	6	2	0	0	0	0
2011–12	Porin Ässät	SM-liiga	43	3	7	10	10	2	0	0	0	0
2012–13	LeKi	Mestis	10	1	4	5	4	—	—	—	—	—
2012–13	Oulun Kärpät	SM-liiga	45	3	5	8	8	3	0	1	1	0
2013–14	HC Satakunta	Suomi-sarja	23	4	16	20	22	—	—	—	—	—
2013–14	KooKoo	Mestis	8	1	5	6	4	17	2	7	9	6
2014–15	HC Satakunta	Suomi-sarja	2	0	0	0	0	—	—	—	—	—
2014–15	LeKi	Mestis	10	4	3	7	6	7	2	4	6	0
2015–16	LeKi	Mestis	29	2	12	14	4	—	—	—	—	—
SM-liiga totals			177	10	22	32	44	10	0	1	1	0
