= Marjo-Riikka Mäkelä =

Finnish actress

- Born: Marjo-Riikka Mäkelä; 7 May 1971 (age 54); Lappeenranta, Finland
- Occupations: Actress, director, acting coach
- Years active: 1993–present

Marjo-Riikka Mäkelä (born 7 May 1971) is a Finnish stage and independent film actress, director, acting coach, and the founder of Los Angeles–based acting studio Chekhov Studio International. Much of Mäkelä's mention in Finnish media is associated with Michael Chekhov acting technique.

== Career ==
In Europe, Mäkelä hosted Finnish television series Kulttuuri Putiikki from 1994 to 1996. After leaving Kulttuuri Putiikki, she worked primarily on stage, acting in mostly classic plays, such as Molière's Le Misanthrope, and some modern plays, such as Pippi Longstocking. She trained at the Russian Academy of Theatre Arts (GITIS) and emigrated to the United States and resumed her stage career as Candy in the stage adaptation of The Cider House Rules and as the title character in Euripides' "Medea".

== Chekhov technique ==
During her training in Russia, Mäkelä began working with Michael Chekhov acting technique, which emphasizes use of the imagination to create experiences relevant to the role over use of personal experiences and memory. Using it often in her own work, she has also become a coach of the technique, particularly in Los Angeles, Helsinki, and São Paulo.
