= Seppo Pietinen =

Finnish diplomat and lawyer (1925–1990)

Finland Ambassador to Tanzania
- In office 1971–1973

Finland Ambassador to Ethiopia
- In office 1972–1973

Finland Ambassador to Uganda
- In office 1972–1973

Finland Ambassador to Austria
- In office 1976–1980

Finland Ambassador to the Vatican
- In office 1977–1980

Finland Ambassador to Peru
- In office 1980–1983

Finland Ambassador to Colombia
- In office 1980–1982

Finland Ambassador to France
- In office 1986–1988

Seppo Taito Pietinen (23 October 1925 Viipuri – 5 June 1990 Helsinki) was a Finnish diplomat and lawyer with title of Master in Law. He was an Ambassador in Dar es Salaam from 1971 to 1973, and in Addis Ababa and Lusaka from 1972 to 1973, then Deputy Head of Department of the Ministry of Foreign Affairs 1973–1976, Ambassador in Vienna from 1976 to 1980 and at the same time the Finnish Permanent UN mission and the Holy See 1977–1980, In Lima, 1980–1983, in Bogotá, 1980–1982 Head of the Political Department of the Foreign Ministry 1983– Ambassador to Paris 1986–1988.
