= Mia Mäkilä =

Swedish artist

Mia Mäkilä (born March 21, 1979 in Norrköping) is a Swedish artist particularly known for her Boschian (Hieronymus Bosch) style in her mixed media works. She is also involved in the European Lowbrow Art Movement.

In 2008, Mäkilä did the album cover and booklet art for Spark Large, the first full-length album by Marching Band. It was released August 5, 2008 by U & L Records.
