= Hannu Mäkelä =

Hannu Mäkelä is the name of

- Hannu Mäkelä (writer) (born 1943), Finnish writer
- Hannu Mäkelä (athlete) (born 1949), Finnish sprinter
