= Forty Elephants =

19th- and 20th-century gang of female shoplifters in the UK

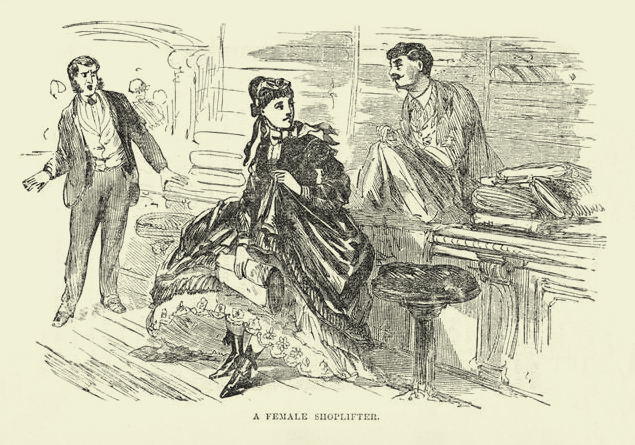
- The "Forty Elephants" were a 19th-20th century all-female crime syndicate who specialised in shoplifting
- Founding location: Elephant and Castle District, London, England
- Years active: late 19th century–1950s
- Ethnicity: English
- Membership (est.): 70
- Criminal activities: Shoplifting
- Allies: Elephant and Castle Mob

The Forty Elephants or Forty Thieves were a 19th to 20th century all-female London crime syndicate who specialized in shoplifting, also called hoisting at the time. This gang was notable for its longevity and skill in avoiding police detection.

== History ==
The Forty Thieves operated from the Elephant and Castle area of London. They were allied with the Elephant and Castle Mob led by the McDonald brothers. They raided quality stores in the West End of London and ranged all over the country. The gang was also known to masquerade as housemaids for wealthy families before ransacking their homes, often using false references. They were in existence from at least 1873 to the 1950s with some indications that they may have existed since the late 18th century.

There are mentions of young women and girls connected with or acting as accomplices to a male gang named "The Forty Thieves" as early as 1828. The members of this gang were between the ages ten and twenty. Both the male and female members of this gang carried tattooed marks on their hand in the form of dots made with "indian ink" by which the gang recognized each other. It is not known for certain if this was a predecessor to the later "Forty Elephants".

It's dubious whether the gang had a continuous existence under the name "The Forty Thieves", it being more likely that it existed merely as a subdivision under other gangs and under different leaders at different times and only emerging towards the end of the 19th century as a distinctive and separate organization. The name referring to an all-female gang is certainly attested in contemporary publications and documents from that period, with the earliest date being 1876.

=== Leadership ===
The first identifiable leader of the gang was Mary Carr, born in Holborn in 1862. It is thought that Carr became involved with the gang some time in the 1870s, and that she steadily advanced through the hierarchy to become a prominent member of the gang and eventually earning her the leadership position and the nickname "Queen of the Forty Thieves".

Carr married a fellow criminal named Thomas Crane in 1888. The gang is said to have used Carr's home at 118 Stamford Street as their headquarters. The street had such a bad reputation that it was called "one of the ugliest and sordid streets in London".

Carr would take on aliases such as Polly Carr, Eva Jackson, Anne Leslie and Jenny Lesley.

Carr was later romantically involved with the leader of the Elephant and Castle gang, Alf Gorman. Carr was particularly known as a jewel thief in West End hotels towards the end of her career. Carr's charismatic leadership style made her so famous during her life that she was claimed to be the model for a number of famous paintings such as "The Maid With the Yellow Hair" (1895) by Frederick Leighton and Dorothy Tennant. It has also been suggested that Carr was inspiration for The Worst Woman in London, a play by Walter Melville.

Contemporary headlines reported that, after Carr's trial and prison sentence for child abduction, fellow Forty Thieves member Minnie Duggan succeeded her. But as Carr would be released three years later, it is entirely possibly that Duggan was just temporarily filling the leadership role until Carr was released.

Both Duggan and Carr would be incarcerated in 1905. Helen Sheen, nicknamed "Fair Helen", then had a brief stint as leader of the gang in the years 1905-1906. Sheen was arrested and sentenced to two years after drugging and stealing from a man.

Carr, having been released from her last prison sentence, afterwards moved to Manchester, where she died in 1924.

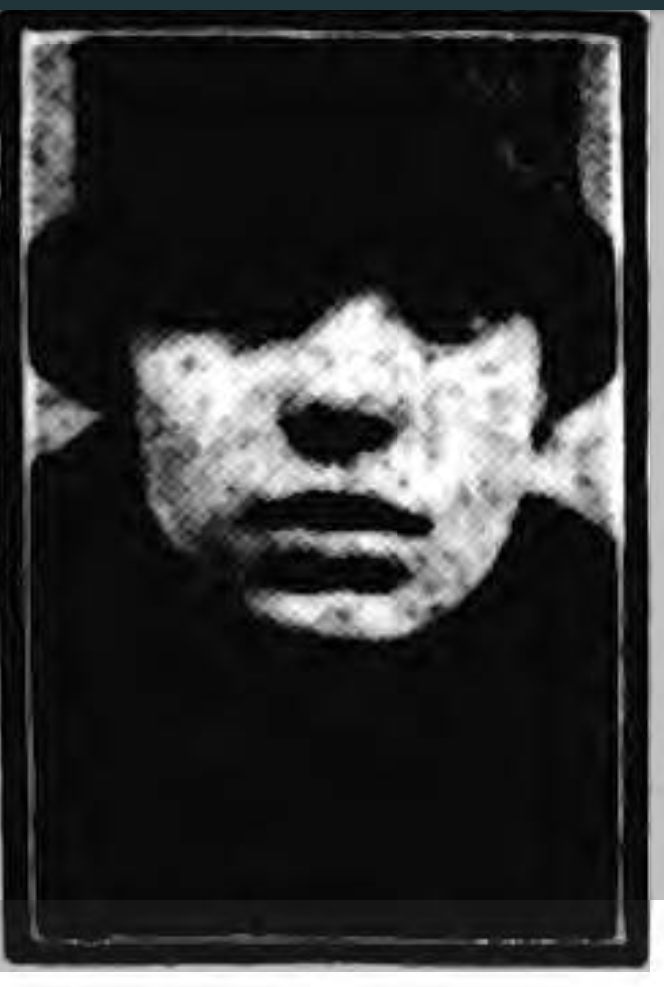
Alice Diamond (1926) in an article published in The People

Subsequently from 1915, the gang was led by Alice Diamond, known variously as the Queen of the Forty Thieves, Diamond Annie, and a friend of Maggie Hill and Dollie Mays, sisters of gangster Billy Hill.

Their heyday was in the interwar period, when the gang raided on a large scale not only in the West End of London, but also other major shopping centres across the country. They also forced smaller gangs to pay tribute on what they had stolen and would punish criminals who did not obey their rules. The gang had its own set of rules and demanded loyalty from its members and others in their supply and distribution network. Alice Diamond ruled with absolute authority with the co-operation of Maggie Hill, Gertrude Scully, the Partridge sisters, and many others. Over seventy direct members of the gang operating in the 1920s and 1930s have been identified. Reports that the gang collapsed when their leaders were jailed for the 1925 Battle of Lambeth are incorrect. The gang was still in existence after World War II as new family members replaced old hands.

They were said to be able to meet numbers of men in street fights, though preferring to stick to their speciality of sneak thieving, and were admired by their male counterparts in the Elephant Gang for their organisation and expertise. One member of the gang, Lilian Goldstein (née Kendall), was known to police as the Bobbed-Haired Bandit, the lover of Elephant Gang associate Ruby Sparks, and was useful as a driver on his smash and grab raids. The gang was also associated with Frankie Fraser, whose sister Eva Fraser was a member of the "Forty Elephants".

Diamond would retire from leadership of the gang in the 1930s and the role be taken over by Maggie Hill. Hill was arrested in 1939 for blinding a policeman with a hat-pin and sentenced to four years in Holloway prison. On her release Hill retired from shop-lifting.

Hill herself was succeeded by Shirley Pitts. Pitts had been taught to shoplift under the tutelage of Diamond and other gang members in the 1940s. Pitts was given the name "Queen of the Shoplifters" by the newspapers. She was an acquaintance of Ronnie Knight, the Kray brothers, and Charlie Wilson. Pitts would lead the gang until her death in 1992.

Its been said that the gang was named the "Forty Thieves"/"Forty Elephants" because it had forty gang members. This is unlikely, with the gang under both Carr and Diamond, at the most, having fifteen core gang members. The figures that support a larger number often made no difference between actual members and persons associated with the gang such as family members. The name has also been speculated to derive its name from the folktale Ali Baba and the Forty Thieves, with the name evolving into "Forty Elephants" due to the gang's association with the Elephant and Castle gang and association with the "Elephant Boys".

According to one account the name came about in the 1950s, after the current leader Maggie Hill came back from a shop-lifting spree looking so large and bulky that she resembled "the queen of forty elephants".

== Methods ==
It is unclear how long the gang operated. The earliest mention of the gang in newspapers dates to 1873, but police records from London indicate that female shoplifters had been active in the area since the late 18th century. The original gang members wore women's clothing which was modified to include hidden pockets. They could hide their loot in their coats, cloaks, cummerbunds, muffs, skirts, bloomers, and hats. This hiding of things in their clothing was called "to clout" or "clouting". They raided the large stores of West End of London. Due to the modest attitudes of the era, female customers were afforded privacy from the store staff, giving female shoplifters the opportunity to escape notice.

However, much shoplifting by women of all classes went undetected, and even when they were caught, middle-class women shoplifters often did not suffer official prosecution. The shop assistants' hesitancy to accuse what appeared to be a respectable wealthy customer of theft therefore was of benefit for the female thieves.

Another method was the gang members approaching well-to-do looking men on the street under the pretense of asking for directions. While the man was showing the young woman the way, other female gang members would appear and accuse the man of assault. Rather than make a scene, the man would give them money or valuables. If the man did threaten to call the police, they would make do with stealing his pocket-watch or other valuable items on his person close at hand.

The gang stole goods worth thousands of pounds. The female gang members earned enough money to financially support their husbands. Said husbands included both idle men who lounged at home, and habitual offenders.

The gang eventually became well-known to the area with the high-class shops which they typically targeted. Their mere presence could cause alarm, eliminating the secrecy required for their activities. Their response to this challenge was to expand their activities from London to other British towns, where they were less known. They targeted rural areas and seaside towns.

During the 20th century, the gang modernized their activities. They invested in fast cars to transport their loot, and to use as getaway vehicles which could outrun the police. Loot was also transferred through the British railway system. The members used trains to travel to a town and deposited their empty suitcases at railway stations. During their return trip, the suitcases were filled with stolen goods.

Besides shoplifting the gang developed sidelines, such as looting houses and blackmailing individuals. Gang members used false reference letters to get hired as maids and then robbed the houses of their employers. They also managed to seduce men into brief affairs, and then blackmailed them with threats of ruining their reputations.

By the 1920s, the gang members started imitating the so-called bright young things group whose exploits appeared in the popular press. The gang members led extravagant and decadent lifestyles, imitating the exploits of the era's movie stars and flappers. Part of their earnings were used to finance party events and to "spend lavishly" at the clubs, pubs, and restaurants which the gang members frequented.

The gang was particularly territorial. Other shoplifters who stole from shops on their turf were forced to pay the gang a percentage of their takings. If the intruders refused to pay, the gang arranged beatings and kidnappings of the offenders until the payment was received.

While various gang members were arrested and convicted at times, their prison sentences tended to be short. They could be sentenced to either 12 months of penal labour or 3 years incarceration. Once released, they returned to the gang. Several of the members remained with the gang for a relatively long time. A gang member known as Ada Wellman was initially arrested in 1921. She was still with the gang when arrested for another offence in 1939.

While the gang members often stole clothing items, they typically did not wear the stolen clothes. Their loot was distributed to a network of fences, street market traders, and pawnbrokers. Part of the stolen clothing items were sold to clothing stores, which simply replaced the labels and modified their designs. Some of the fences associated with the gang were also arrested, but could not be convicted. Ada McDonald was arrested as a suspected fence in 1910. She used ledgers of suspect authenticity to convince the authorities that the goods in her possession were the products of legitimate financial transactions. Jane Durrell, another suspected fence, and her common-law-husband Jim Bullock were both placed on trial in 1911. The jury decided that the police evidence against them was insufficient and they were acquitted of the charges and released.

== Adaptations ==
- Disney + 2025 show A Thousand Blows created by Steven Knight with Erin Doherty playing Mary Carr.

== See also ==
- A Thousand Blows, a television drama series about the gang
- Gangs in the United Kingdom
- List of British gangsters
