= Heini Mäkelä =

Finnish footballer (born 1987)

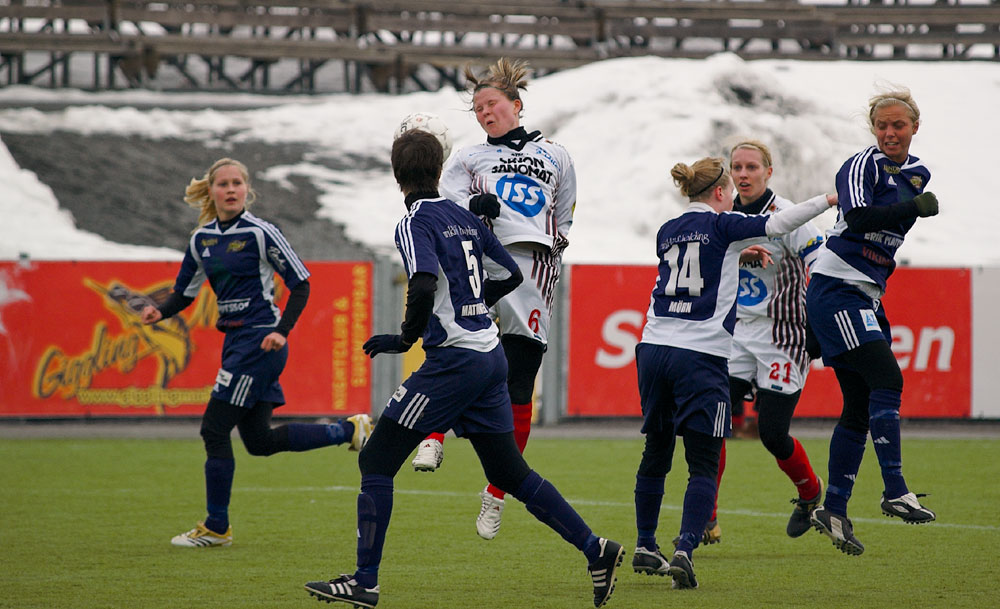
- KMF's Heini Mäkelä (6) heads the ball. KMF – Åland United, 9 April 2006 at Kuopio Football Stadium.

Personal information
- Date of birth: 19 December 1987 (age 38)
- Position: Defender

Senior career*
Years	Team	Apps	(Gls)
2002	Kuopio MimmiFutis		

International career
2008	Finland	5	(1)
- * Club domestic league appearances and goals

Heini Mäkelä (née Tiilikainen), (born 19 December 1987) is a Finnish footballer who plays as a midfielder. Mäkelä plays for Kuopio MimmiFutis in Kuopio and the Finnish national team as a defender.

== International career ==
Mäkelä was a member of the Finland team that reached the semi-final of the 2005 UEFA Women's Under-19 Championship and the semi-finals of the 2006 FIFA U-20 Women's World Championship.

Heini Mäkelä made her senior for Finland against Scotland on 27 August 2008. Heini Mäkelä was selected to part of the Finnish team at the 2009 European Championships. Mäkelä had to withdraw due to injury and was replaced by Maiju Hirvonen. Mäkelä scored her first goal for the national team against Italy in a World Cup qualifier on 31 March 2010, the game ended in 1-1.
