= Mikko Mäkelä =

Mikko Mäkelä may refer to:

- Mikko Mäkelä (ice hockey) (born 1965), Finnish ice hockey player
- Mikko Mäkelä (filmmaker) (born 1989), Finnish filmmaker
