= Educational Service Units of Nebraska =

Overview of Nebraska educational service agencies

Educational Service Units (ESUs) are political subdivisions that serve as intermediate level education service agencies for member school districts. Educational Service Units were created by the Nebraska Legislature in 1965 as cooperative programs to make services more cost effective for school districts. There are currently 17 ESUs providing services to 261 public school districts. Educational Service Units provide core services for school districts, which include staff development, technology, and instructional materials. Beyond the core services, ESUs determine the services to be offered based on the needs of their member school districts.

Regional service agencies are present in over half of U.S. states. The method of selecting the board varies, but most are either elected by the public or selected by local school boards. A more in-depth analysis of the selection process is contained in the section on Governance.

In addition to regional service agencies, county or regional superintendents are publicly elected in parts of Arizona, California, Illinois, and Montana. In New Jersey, county superintendents are appointed by the chief state school officer, and in North Dakota by county commissioners. Nebraska allows for county school administrators to be appointed by county boards, but eliminated the elected office of county superintendent as of June 30, 2000.

Educational Service Units have been studied on several occasions. The most significant studies were in 1986 by the Legislature and in 1995 by the Department of Education. This review builds on the prior studies and examines the current status of ESUs, including changes implemented as a result of the preceding efforts.

The study was conducted by a staff group consisting of legislative staff from the Education Committee, staff from the offices of members of the Education Committee, and staff from the Legislative Fiscal Office. The staff group conducted the study using several methods. First historical research was done beginning with the prior studies and building on the information they provided. The Legislative Fiscal Office provided updated financial information. Internet resources were used to derive national information. The staff group then visited six ESUs, met with representatives from seven additional ESUs, and invited the other four ESUs to provide input. The staff group also gathered information through surveys sent to each ESU and each school district. The surveys replicated the surveys from 1986 and 1995. However, the redundancy of the responses on the ESU surveys in this study indicated efforts by a number of the ESUs to coordinate their answers. This effort compromised the quality of information by limiting the perspectives that were shared with the study group. The ESU survey utilized open-ended questions, resulting in a narrative description, rather than a quantitative summary.

This report looks at four categories of issues: Boundaries, Governance, Finance, and Services. The report is organized according to those categories. Under each category is a background section, a section discussing potential issues, and a section indicating possible changes. The potential issues and possible changes do not necessarily reflect the views of the staff group that compiled this report or the views of the Education Committee, but rather represent concerns and ideas that have been brought forward over time or in the process of this study.

The statutory requirements governing ESUs are generally contained in the Educational Service Units Act. However, as a political subdivision other provisions also apply, such as the Nebraska Budget Act, the Elections Act, and the Interlocal Cooperation Act.

The Department of Education has also issued two rules regarding ESUs. Rule 84 is the accreditation rule for ESUs. Rule 85 provides the procedures for ESU reorganizations.

In the visits to ESUs and with ESU staffs, there was generally an eagerness to show how much had been accomplished with limited funding. There was a definite emphasis on economic efficiency and the delivery of services. However, a major concern for most ESUs was the inability to provide more services due to financial constraints.
