= Merja Makinen =

UK literary scholar (1953-)

Merja Makinen (born 1953) is a British literary scholar, and was director of communication and culture at Middlesex University. She is an expert on feminist writing of the twentieth century, particularly that of Angela Carter and Jeanette Winterson, and has written on the feminist aspects of popular genre fiction such as the books of Agatha Christie.

== Selected publications ==
- Joyce Cary: A Descriptive Bibliography. Mansell, London, 1989. (with Kevin Harris) ISBN 0720119855
- "Angela Carter's "The Bloody Chamber" and the Decolonization of Feminine Sexuality", Feminist Review, No. 42, Feminist Fictions (Autumn 1992), pp. 2–15.
- Female fetishism: A new look. Lawrence & Wishart, 1994. (with Lorraine Gamman) ISBN 0853157553
- Feminist Popular Fiction. Palgrave, Basingstoke, 2001. ISBN 033379317X
- The Novels of Jeanette Winterson. Palgrave Macmillan, Basingstoke, 2005. ISBN 9781137158994
- Agatha Christie: Investigating Femininity. Palgrave Macmillan, Basingstoke, 2006. ISBN 9781403941718
