= Ivara Esu =

Nigerian academic administrator and politician (born 1951)

Deputy Governor of Cross River State
- Former
- In office 29 May 2015 – 29 May 2023
- Governor: Benedict Ayade

Federal Minister of state for Tourism, Culture and National Orientation
- In office 17 January 2007 – 28 May 2007

State Commissioner of Agriculture, Water Resources and Rural Development
- In office 1992–1993

Personal details
- Born: 3 May 1951 (age 75)
- Party: All Progressives Congress
- Spouse: Omotunde Abosede Ivara Esu
- Education: Community Secondary Grammar School, Ugep, Cross River State. Presbyterian Secondary School Abakaliki, Ebonyi State; University of Ife, Ile Ife; University of Minnesota, St. Paul USA; Ahmadu Bello University, Zaria
- Occupation: Academic Administrator, Politician
- Profession: Soil Scientist

Ivara Ejemot Esu OFR, (born 3 May 1951) is a Nigerian politician, academic administrator and professor and the former Deputy Governor of Cross River State. He hails from Agwagune in Biase Local Government Area of Cross River State, Nigeria.

== Early life ==
Ivara Ejemot Esu is the son of Jonathan and Ada Ejemot Esu at Agwagune, in Biase Local Government Area of Cross River State. His father was a businessman.

He attended the University of Ife, later renamed Obafemi Awolowo University, Ile Ife from 1970 to 1974 and graduated with a degree in agriculture. He also attended the University of Minnesota, St. Paul Campus USA between 1976 and 1978 where he obtained an MSc in Soil Science. In 1982, he obtained a PhD in Pedology from the Ahmadu Bello University, Zaria.

== Career ==
Esu started his career in 1975 as an Assistant Lecturer in Soil Science at the Kaduna Polytechnic, Kaduna State and became a professor of pedology in 1994. During these years he taught at the Kaduna Polytechnic, National Institute of Water Resources, Kaduna, Ahmadu Bello University, Zaria, University of Calabar, University of Ghana (visiting scholar) and the University of Uyo where he was an adjunct professor. He was also Dean of Agriculture, Provost of Okuku Campus, Deputy Vice Chancellor (Academic) and later the Vice Chancellor, at the University of Calabar. He taught pedology, soil survey and land use planning.

== Awards ==
He received the Nigerian National Honours Award in the rank of Officer of the Order of the Federal Republic (OFR) in 2005 and the Cross River State Honours Merit Award in 2004 for management reforms at the University of Calabar.

== Positions held ==
He was Vice Chancellor, University of Calabar (2000–2005); Honourable Minister of State for Tourism, Culture and National Orientation (Jan–May 2007); Member, Technical Committee on Privatization and Commercialization (TCPC), Presidency, Lagos (1990–1992); Honourable Commissioner for Agriculture, Water Resources and Rural Development Cross River State (1992–1993); Chairman Federal Medical Centre Board, Owerri (2009–2011) and chairman, Nnamdi Azikiwe University Teaching Hospital, Nnewi (2012–2015) and was an Elder Statesman Delegate at the 2014 National Conference of Nigeria. Esu is a Soil Scientist (Pedologist) who has taught in various tertiary institutions, some of which include; the Kaduna Polytechnic; Ahmadu Bello University Zaria, University of Calabar, University of Uyo and the University of Ghana, Legon, Accra.

== Personal life ==
Esu is married to Omotunde Abosede Ivara Esu, a permanent secretary in the Cross River State Government, and they have four children.

== Books ==
- ESU, I. E. 1999. Fundamentals of Pedology. Stirling-Horden Publishers (Nig.) Ltd., Ibadan 136 pp (Launched in Calabar on 2 Sept. 1999).
- ESU, I. E. 2005. Characterization, Classification and Management Problems of the Major Soil Orders in Nigeria. 26th Inaugural Lecture of the University of Calabar delivered on 26 April 2005. 66 pp.
- ESU, I. E. 2010. Soil Characterization Classification and Survey. Heinneman Book Publishers Nigeria. 252 pp.
