= HC Satakunta =

- City: Eurajoki
- Founded: 2008
- Home arena: Westinghouse Areena
- Colors

Franchise history
- 2008–2015: HC Luvia

HC Satakunta is an ice hockey team in Finland. The team has not been active since leaving Suomi-sarja in 2015.

== History ==
HC Luvia started the season 2008–2009 in the 3. Divisioona, but quickly was promoted to 2. Divisioona.

HC Luvia survived so well that it was promoted to the 3rd highest level, Suomi-sarja in 2011.

In 2015 HC Satakunta officially announced that they will leave Suomi-sarja. The team is currently not active.
