= Embolic stroke of undetermined source =

Medical condition

Embolic stroke of undetermined source (ESUS) is an embolic stroke, a type of ischemic stroke, with an unknown origin, defined as a non-lacunar brain infarct without proximal arterial stenosis or cardioembolic sources. As such, it forms a subset of cryptogenic stroke, which is part of the TOAST-classification. The following diagnostic criteria define an ESUS:

- Stroke detected by CT or MRI that is not lacunar
- No major-risk cardioembolic source of embolism
- Absence of extracranial or intracranial atherosclerosis causing 50% luminal stenosis in arteries supplying the area of ischaemia
- No other specific cause of stroke identified (e.g., arteritis, dissection, migraine/vasospasm, drug misuse)

== Causes ==
The following factors are suggested as pathogenesis of ESUS:

- Subclinical atrial fibrillation: Detectable in ~2.7-30% of ESUS patients, depending on duration and modality of ECG monitoring.
- Patent foramen ovale (PFO): Deep vein thrombosis may result in paradoxical embolism in patients with PFO. About 40% of patients with cryptogenic stroke have PFO compared with 25% of the general population. However, the actual embolic source can often not be identified.
- Non-stenotic arterial plaques: Complicated plaques with signs indicative of intra-plaque haemorrhage in an ipsilateral carotid artery are detected in 1 in 4 of patients with cryptogenic stroke. Aortic arch atherosclerosis is believed to be a specific cause of ESUS, particularly with plaques >4 mm diameter.
- Further cardiopathies: the risk of ischaemic stroke is increased by supraventricular tachycardias. This also applies to patients with elevated NT-proBNP levels and patients with atrial enlargement in cardiac ultrasound.
- Other causes: Arterial dissections, infection-related vasculopathies (esp. Varicella zoster virus), thrombophilia, cancer-related thrombosis, migraine, Fabry disease and other genetic, autoimmune or rheumatic causes.

== Diagnosis ==
ESUS is a diagnosis of exclusion based on radiological and cardiological examinations. For exclusion of haemorrhagic or lacunar strokes CT or MRI imaging is needed. Both procedures also allow detection of embolic pattern of ischemic lesions. 12-lead ECG and cardiac monitoring for at least 24 h with automated rhythm detection are mandated to exclude atrial fibrillation; echocardiography (TTE and/or TEE) is used to detect other major-risk cardioembolic sources (e.g., intracardiac thrombi, or ejection fraction <30%). For imaging of both the extracranial and intracranial arteries supplying the area of brain ischaemia, examination methods like catheter, MR/CT angiography or cervical duplex plus transcranial Doppler ultrasonography are required. They allow an exclusion of large vessel stenosis (≥ 50%).

=== Cryptogenic stroke vs ESUS ===
Cryptogenic stroke is also an ischemic stroke with more than one probable cause or strokes with incomplete diagnostic workup. ESUS has a clearer definition, with an established minimum diagnostic requirements; this is not required in defining a cryptogenic stroke. ESUS is an embolic stroke for which no probable cause can be identified after a standard diagnostic evaluation.

== Management ==
Due to the lack of data, there are no specific treatment guidelines for ESUS. Current guidelines recommend antiplatelet therapy for patients with non-cardioembolic ischemic stroke. However, it is widely believed that there is a substantial overlap between ESUS and cardioembolic stroke, clinical trials have assessed the benefit of anticoagulation versus antiplatelet agents for preventing recurrent stroke. Although the existing data does not favor the use anticoagulation in patients with ESUS, current hypotheses suggest there may be subgroups who do benefit from anticoagulation.

== Epidemiology ==
On average, ESUS accounts for about 1 in 6 ischemic strokes (17% (range 9 – 25%)) according to a systematic literature review of 9 studies. Patients with ESUS tend to be relatively young and experience mild strokes. However, ESUS is associated with high recurrence rates. Of 2045 ESUS patients (identified by 8 studies)

- 58% were male,
- the mean age was 65 years,
- the average annualized rate of stroke recurrence was 4.5%
- mean NIHSS at stroke onset was 5.

The stroke recurrence rate was 29.0% over 5 years in patients with ESUS, which is similar to patients with cardioembolic stroke (26.8%), but significantly higher than all types of non-cardioembolic stroke. However, mortality was significantly lower in patients with ESUS than cardioembolic stroke.
