= Esu Niemelä =

Finnish politician

Esu Evert Niemelä (16 June 1921 – 30 November 1999) was a Finnish farmer and politician.

Niemelä was born in Sääminki. He was a member of the Parliament of Finland from 1958 to 1972, representing the Agrarian League (which changed its name to Centre Party in 1965).
