= Alice Diamond =

English career retail thief (1896–1952)

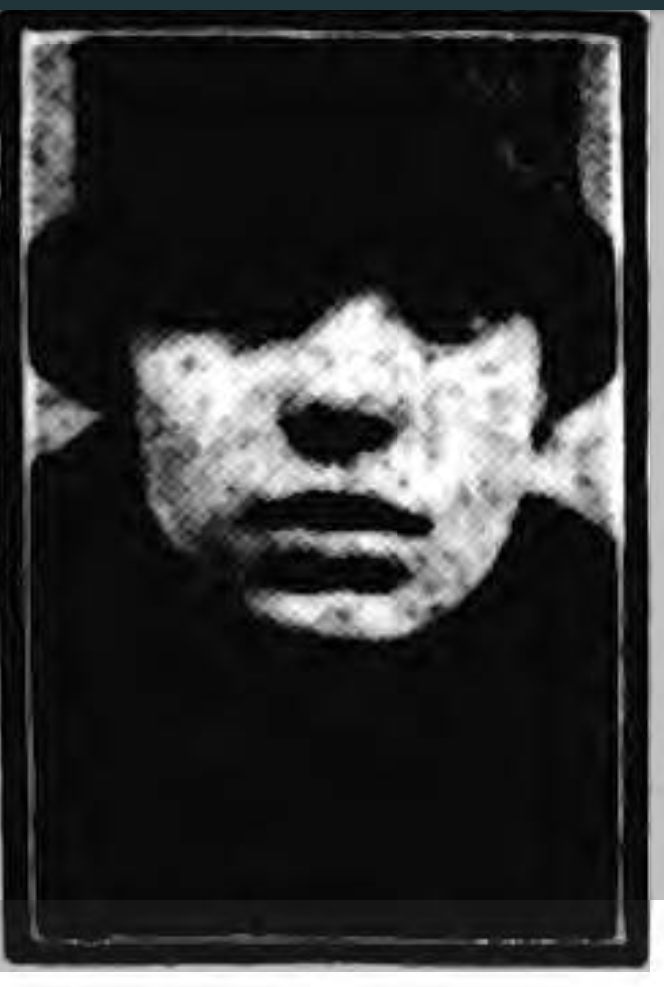
Alice Diamond pictured in 1926

Alice Diamond (22 June 1896 – 1 April 1952) was an English career criminal, linked to organised shoplifting.

== Early life ==
Diamond was born Alice Elizabeth Black in Lambeth Workhouse Hospital to Thomas Diamond and Mary Ann Alice Black. Her parents had applied for a maternity birth under the name of Black before they married to avoid the stigma of an illegitimate birth. However, as they married shortly before Alice was born, this also avoided the problem.

Her father, Thomas Diamond, had at least three criminal convictions, including one for assaulting the son of the Lord Mayor of London at a political meeting by punching his head through a pane of glass in a door, severely injuring him. Alice's mother was born Mary Geary and took the name Black when her parents married. She added Ann and Alice to her name at random times. Alice was the eldest of seven children; a younger sister, Louisa, also joined the Forty Thieves gang of which Alice Diamond had become leader and given the title Queen of the Forty Thieves and, later, Queen of the Forty Elephants, because of her connection to the streets around the Elephant and Castle district of southeast London. A brother, Tommy, became one of the notorious Elephant and Castle gang.

== Career ==
Diamond's criminal career began in 1912 when she was cautioned, along with Mary Austin, who would later marry north London racing gangster Frederick Sabini, for stealing chocolate. A number of convictions for theft followed and in 1915 she was named by police and newspapers as Queen of the Forty Thieves, successor to Mary 'Polly' Carr, who had previously held the title.

Diamond had taken over leadership of a large and expert gang of organised shoplifters. She was a skillful organiser of large expeditions across the West End of London and spread her enterprise to the provinces when London became 'hot'. Her chief lieutenant was volatile and violent Maggie Hill, born Margaret Lily Hill into a criminal north London family that one day would produce Billy Hill, dubbed 'Boss of Britain's Underworld'.

Although Diamond, Margaret Hill and other Elephants served prison terms, they believed the risk was worth it - the alternative being a life of poverty. The gang was known for its stylish dress and wild partying. They could 'put on the posh' and take goods valued at hundreds of pounds from prestigious stores by using specialist garments and clever distraction techniques. Her favourite plunder was fur coats and bolts of silk which were expensive commodities between the World Wars. They were known to drive fast cars and could be violent when confronted. Alice Diamond was over five-foot eight-inches in height at a time when the average height for a man was five-foot six-inches. She wore diamond rings on the fingers of both hands and could deliver a punch a man would have envied. Another of the Forty Elephants was Lilian Goldstein, née Kendall, who was also a driver for smash and grab raider Ruby Sparks, tagged by press and police as 'The Bobbed-Haired Bandit'.

== Personal life ==
Diamond never married, but had a relationship with Bert McDonald, one of the leaders of the Elephant Gang. Diamond died at 11 Marnock House, close to 'East Lane' market in Southwark, on 1 April 1952.

== See also ==
- Shirley Pitts
