= Otso Wartiovaara =

Finnish diplomat

Otso Uolevi Wartiovaara (16 November 1908 Helsinki - 1991) was a Finnish diplomat. He graduated as a Bachelor of Law in 1934 and served as a Counselor in Washington D.C., 1949–1952. He was head of the administrative department of the Ministry of Foreign Affairs 1952–1954, head of the Legal Department 1954–1956, and then he was the Envoy in Belgrade 1956–1958 (as Ambassador 1958–1961) and Athens 1956–1961 and Ambassador in Vienna in 1961–1968 and at the same time Finland's Permanent Representative to the United Nations and as Ambassador to London 1968–1974.
