= Hoxton Gang =

Soho based street gang

- Years active: c.1930 -c.1940
- Territory: West End of London
- Ethnicity: English
- Membership: c.30
- Criminal activities: gambling
- Rivals: Italian Mob : Sabini gang

The Hoxton Gang (or Hoxton Mob) was an independent street gang based in Soho, London, during the interwar years. They were one of several West End gangs which fought against Charles "Darby" Sabini and the "Italian Mob", specifically over control of gambling clubs or "spielers".

== History ==
During the 1930s, the gang was among many who struggled for control of racetracks and protection rackets and, in June 1936, around 30 gang members attacked a bookmaker and his clerk with hammers and knuckle-dusters at the Lewes racetrack before police arrived, with at least 16 gang members being convicted at Lewes Assizes and sentenced to serve over 43 years. The leader of the Hoxton Mob was called Jimmy Spinks, he was then great uncle of Lenny McLean who was the Guv'nor and known as the hardest man in Britain.

The play West by Steven Berkoff features a character Curly, a leader of the Hoxton Gang.
