= Mäkinen =

- Language: Finnish

Origin
- Meaning: derived from mäki ("hill")
- Region of origin: Finland

Mäkinen is a surname of Virtanen type originating in Finland (in Finnish, mäki means "hill"), where it is the fourth most common surname. Notable people with the surname include:

- Aito Mäkinen (1927–2017), Finnish film director, screenwriter and film producer
- Anne Mäkinen (born 1976), Finnish association football player
- Atte Mäkinen (born 1995), Finnish ice hockey player
- Ben Makinen, American filmmaker, music producer, composer and drummer
- Einar Mäkinen (1895–1964), Finnish general
- Eino Mäkinen (1926–2014), Finnish weightlifter
- Eveliina Mäkinen (born 1995), Finnish ice hockey goaltender and coach
- Jari Mäkinen (born 1990), Finnish speedway rider
- Jarmo Mäkinen (born 1958), Finnish actor
- Jussi Mäkinen (1929–1978), Finnish ambassador
- Heikki Mäkinen (1888–1960), Finnish house painter and politician
- Kaarlo Mäkinen (1892–1980), Finnish wrestler
- Kalle Mäkinen (born 1989), Finnish footballer
- Kari Mäkinen (born 1955), Finnish bishop
- Kari Mäkinen (canoeist) (born 1945), Finnish ice hockey player and coach
- Kauko Mäkinen (1927–1968), Finnish ice hockey player
- Konsta Mäkinen (born 1992), Finnish ice hockey player
- Marko Mäkinen (born 1977), Finnish ice hockey player
- Marvin Makinen (born 1939), American biochemist, human rights activist
- Matti Mäkinen (born 1947), Finnish orienteer
- Merja Makinen (born 1953), university administrator
- Meri-Maari Mäkinen (born 1992), Finnish swimmer
- Niina Mäkinen (born 1992), Finnish ice hockey player
- Nora Mäkinen (1920–1984), Finnish model and actor
- Pertti Mäkinen (born 1952), Finnish sculptor
- Rauno Mäkinen (1931–2010), Finnish wrestler
- Riitta Mäkinen (born 1979), Finnish politician
- Santeri Mäkinen (born 1992), Finnish footballer
- Seppo Mäkinen (born 1941), Finnish sports shooter
- Thomas Mäkinen (born 1997), Finnish footballer
- Timo Mäkinen (1938–2017), Finnish rally driver
- Tommi Mäkinen (born 1964), Finnish rally driver
- Väinö Mäkinen (1915–1983), Finnish engineer and politician
- Visa Mäkinen (born 1945), Finnish film director and producer
- William Mäkinen (born 1995), Finnish ice hockey player
