= T. O. Vahervuori =

Finnish diplomat

Torsten Oskar (T. O.) Vahervuori, until 1908 Nordquist (8 January 1901 Helsinki – 25 June 1978 Luhanka) was a Finnish diplomat, Master of Arts . He was Head of Department Ministry for Foreign Affairs 1946–1950, Envoy to Rio de Janeiro 1950–1956, Copenhagen 1956–1957, State Secretary 1957–1960 and Ambassador to Rome, Cyprus and Tunisia 1961–1968.

His career is characterized by the fact that in Finland he moved to the top of the official hierarchy of the Foreign Ministry but he did not actively seek foreign policy positions of political importance from the point of view of Finland. Vahervuori was a classical school carriageway, which was greatly appreciated by his devotion to the languages and cultures of his country.
