= Maggie McIver =

Founder of The Barras (1880 – 1958)

Margaret McIver
- Maggie Mciver
- Born: Margaret Russell; 9 May 1880; Glasgow
- Died: 1958 (aged 77–78)
- Citizenship: British
- Occupation: Business owner
- Known for: Founding the Barras market

Margaret McIver (9 May 1880 – 1958), also known as "The Barras Queen", was the founder of The Barras, a street market in the Calton area in the east end of Glasgow. Initially an area of street markets, it became a permanent site when a roof was added to protect the stalls from bad weather and it now has over a thousand stalls within 10 markets. It is also the location of the Barrowland Ballroom, one of the city's main rock and pop venues.

== Early life ==
Maggie McIver was born Margaret Russell in Galston, Ayrshire, on 9 May 1880. Her father, Thomas Russell, was a policeman and her mother, Margaret Sclanders, was a French polisher. Before opening her own fruit shop, Maggie worked as a French polisher just like her mother. She met her husband James McIver at the fruit market and they set up their own business hiring out horses and carts to local hawkers.

== The Barras ==
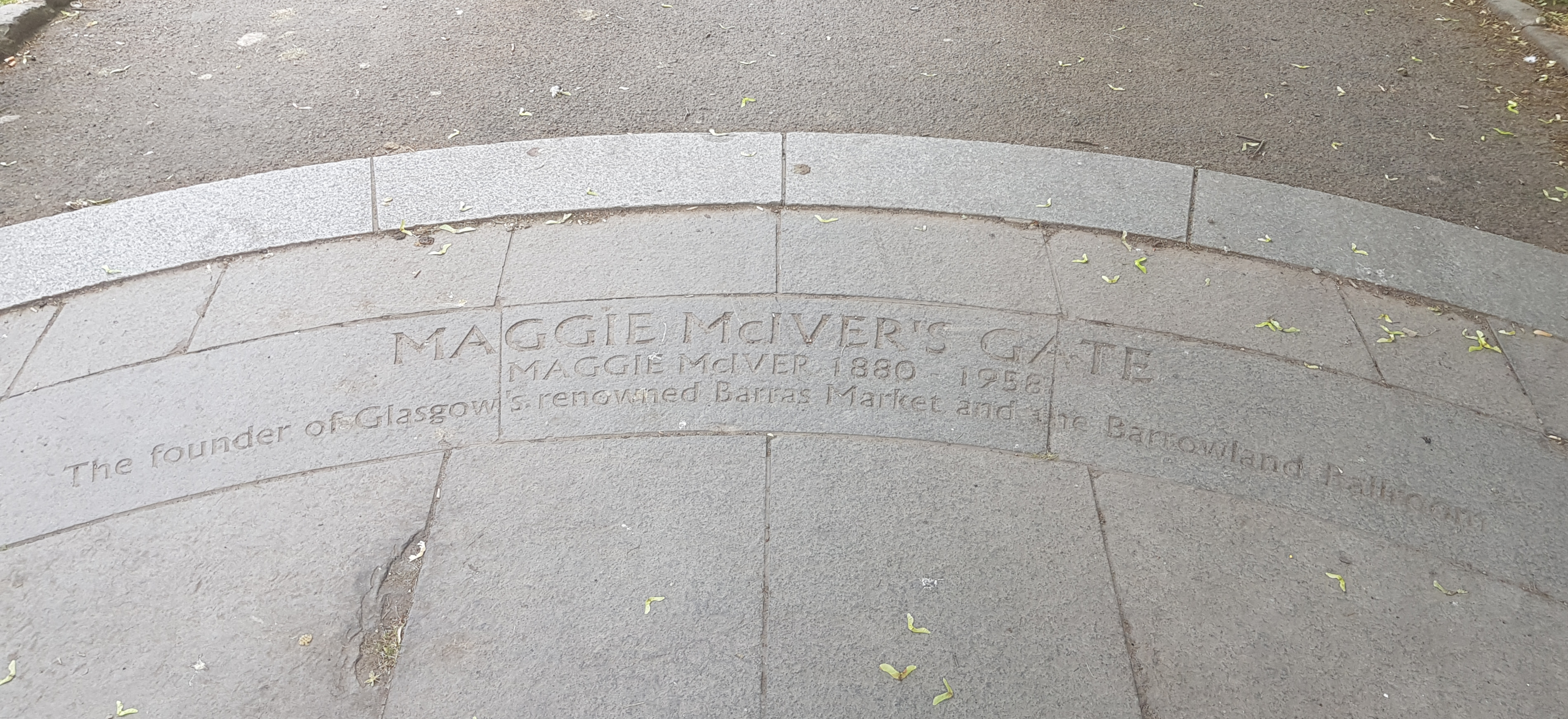
Glasgow Green gate dedicated to Maggie McIver

McIver hired over 300 barrows to local hawkers in her yard in Marshall Lane. This was in response to the Local Corporation wishing to stop local street traders and the street traders being charged by the police. In 1926, Maggie McIver decided to cover the market mainly to protect clothing hawkers from having their stock ruined. The market was fully enclosed two years later.

== The Barrowlands ==
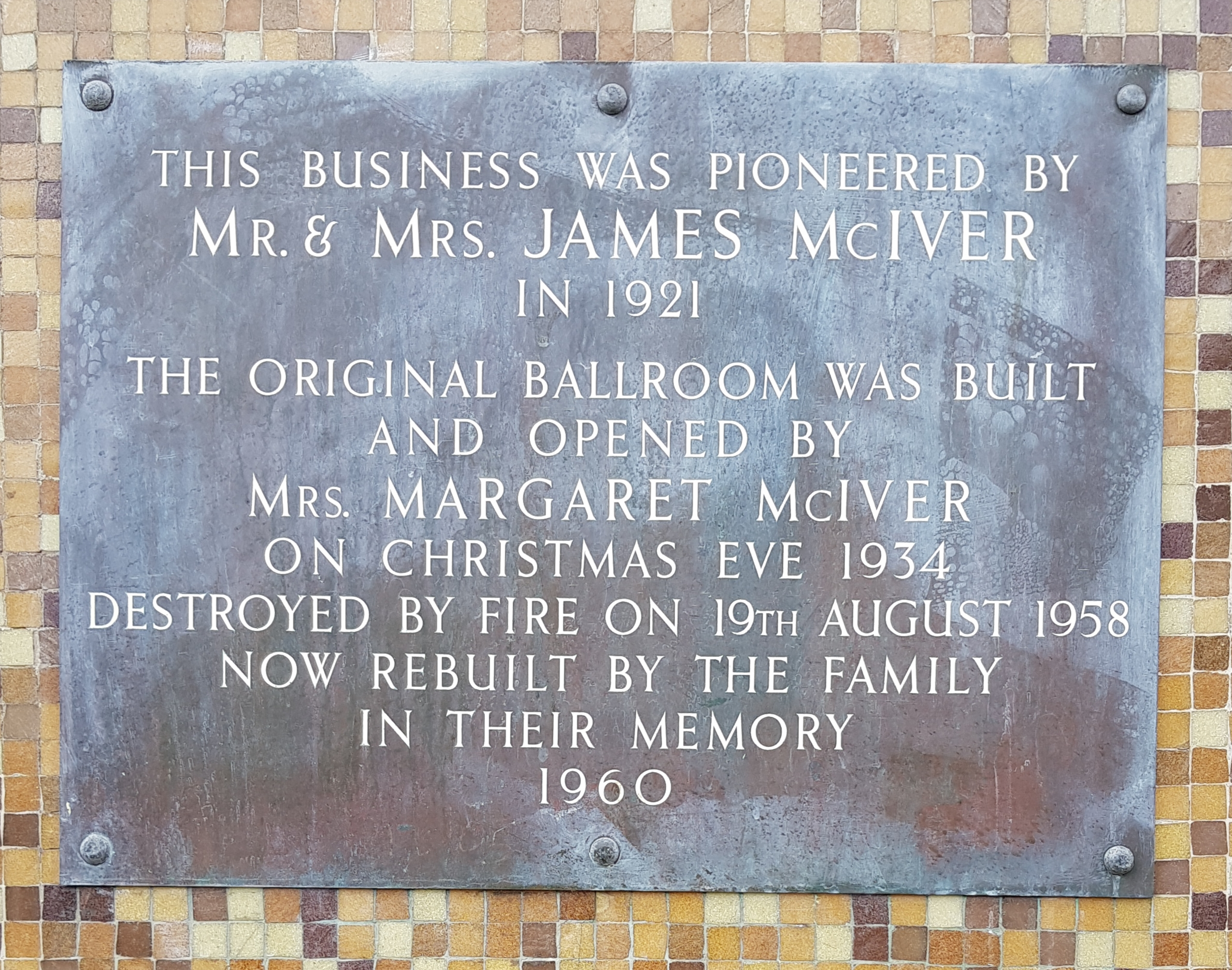
Plaque dedicated to Maggie and James McIver outside the Barrowland ballrooms

It was common practice for McIver to host a Christmas party for the hawkers and their families in a local hall. One year, when McIver was unable to hire the hall, she decided to build her own, the famous Barrowland Ballrooms which opened Christmas Eve 1934.

== Commemoration ==
A plaque has been added to the Barrowlands Ballroom to commemorate Maggie McIver as part of twelve Scots being honoured by Historic Environment Scotland (HES). There is also a commemorative stone carving at one of the gate entrances to Glasgow Green.
