= Greatest Hits Volume II (Nazareth album) =

Greatest Hits Volume 2

Compilation album by Nazareth
- Released: 1998
- Genre: Hard rock
- Length: 79:14
- Label: Essential
- Producer: Nazareth

Nazareth chronology
Boogaloo (1998)	Greatest Hits Volume 2 (1998)	Live at the Beeb (1998)

Greatest Hits Volume 2 is a compilation album by Scottish hard rock band Nazareth, released in 1998.

In the mid-1990s much of Nazareth's back catalog was remastered. Their record label, Castle Communications, took the opportunity afforded and requested that a new album be compiled, which was to become Greatest Hits Volume 2 (Essential ESMCD 597). This was to be a CD-only release that would cover the period from the band's 1979 album No Mean City to 1994's Move Me.

The artwork was designed to complement that of the original vinyl Greatest Hits, which was also included in the remastering program.

Additionally, not all the band's latest studio albums were included in this original remaster program and so Greatest Hits Volume 2 was the only opportunity afforded to fans to have at least some of these songs in remastered form. Eventually all the band's studio albums were remastered and issued (including a 2CD version of ''Snaz containing all of the tunes from the original double live album).

Professional ratings
Review scores
Source	Rating
Allmusic	2.5/5 stars

== Track listing ==
No.	Title	Length
1.	"Whatever You Want Babe"
2.	"Star"
3.	"Heart's Grown Cold"
4.	"Holiday"
5.	"Tush" (Live)
6.	"Love Hurts" (Live)
7.	"Cocaine" (Live)
8.	"Dressed to Kill"
9.	"Morgentau"
10.	"Love Leads to Madness"
11.	"Dream On"
12.	"Milk and Honey"
13.	"Where Are You Now"
14.	"Ruby Tuesday"
15.	"A Veteran's Song"
16.	"Piece of My Heart"
17.	"Winner on the Night"
18.	"This Flight Tonight" (1991 version)
19.	"Tell Me That You Love Me"
20.	"Let Me Be Your Dog"
