= Tongland (disambiguation) =

Tongland is the name of several places

Tongland is a parish in Dumfries and Galloway.

Tongland is a village in Tongland Parish, Dumfries and Galloway.

Tongland was an area of Glasgow controlled by the Tong gang during the 1960s.
