= Gangs in the United Kingdom =

Organised crime gangs

Gang-related organised crime in the United Kingdom is concentrated around the cities of London, Manchester and Liverpool and regionally across the West Midlands region, south coast and northern England, according to the Serious Organised Crime Agency. With regard to street gangs the cities identified as having the most serious gang problems, which accounted for 65% of firearm homicides in England and Wales, were London, Birmingham, Manchester and Liverpool. Glasgow in Scotland also has a historical gang culture with the city having as many teenage gangs as London, which had six times the population, in 2008.

In the early part of the 20th century, the cities of Leeds, Bristol, Bradford, and more prominently Keighley, and Nottingham all commanded headlines pertaining to street gangs and suffered their share of high-profile firearms murders. Sheffield, which has a long history of gangs traced back to the 1920s in the book "The Sheffield Gang Wars", along with Leicester is one of numerous urban centres seen to have an emerging or re-emerging gang problem.

In November 2007, a major offensive against gun crime committed by gangs in Birmingham, Liverpool, London and Manchester led to 118 arrests. More than 1,000 police officers were involved in the raids. Not all of the 118 arrests were gun related. Others were linked to drugs, prostitution and other crimes. Home Secretary Jacqui Smith said it showed the police could "fight back against gangs".

In the 2000s, Britain's street gangs in certain inner city areas such as London and Manchester became influenced by America's Crips and Bloods. This was evidenced by identification with colours, hand signs, graffiti tags and in some cases gang names, for example Old Trafford Cripz and Moss Side Bloods or 031 (O-Tray-One) Bloods gang and ABM (All Bout Money) Crips. This phenomenon has since declined during the 2010s.

Debate persists over the extent and nature of gang activity in the UK.

As a result of austerity reforms, there are fewer public spaces set aside as of 2018 for the purpose of keeping young people off the street, such as youth centres. As a result, some children as young as 9 begin to carry weapons and turn to gang activities for safety, or to provide for their families through drug trafficking.

== "Scuttlers" and rise of gang culture ==
The Factory Act 1833 regulated child labour in the UK: children could no longer work in factories. Children were now spending more time on the streets while the rest of their families went to work all day. The lack of an extra stable source of income for families led to an increase in petty crimes among working-class youths in the late 19th century. As children spent more time with siblings and neighbours on the street, pranks became commonplace and were viewed as devious attempts to outsmart authority. Along with pranking, petty crime among older teenagers was also on the rise.

Because older teenagers could not earn enough money to support their families, especially in the absence of one parent—which was common—many resorted to stealing. Food and cigarettes were the most common forms of property that were stolen in the late 19th century. These small crimes and this culture of pranks added to the underlying resistance to authority that existed among working-class youths who had no other outlets to control their environment.

The early groups in the 1840s were family oriented and were typically composed of brothers, sisters, and neighbours. While petty crime rose everywhere during the 19th century in England, individual crimes differed from city-to-city and even persisted in rural areas. Gangs were not unique to deprived areas, and many arose in many working-class towns that were flourishing from trade. Early forms of gangs were based upon territory and locality rather than certain ethnic or religious affiliations, which tended to be the defining characteristics of gangs in the early 20th century.

Many of the names of early British gangs included titles of local areas and streets, such as the Bengal Tigers who originated from Bengal Street in Manchester. The idea of “hooliganism” was used to describe these types of crimes committed by working-class youth, and drew great concern from the press and middle class during this time. "Scuttlers" was the specific term given to the perpetuators of these early, petty crimes. These factions were not highly organised, and most people drifted in and out of membership. The early development of petty crime with groups forming an identity for themselves through names and clothes helped create the framework for more organised crime groups that gained great notoriety throughout the early 20th century.

== Gangs in major urban centres ==
=== Belfast ===
Northern Ireland had over 150 active criminal gangs in 2014. In Belfast, there were estimated to be approximately 80 gangs in 2003, most nominally sectarian, engaged in racketeering across the city.

An investigation in 2014 found that some gangs in Belfast were particularly hostile towards non-white residents of the city, with numerous cases of racially motivated violence, intimidation and extortion having been reported.

Gangs in Belfast have been involved in people smuggling and human trafficking. Although the vice industry was previously mostly on the street, in recent years it has moved indoors to residential homes and hotels and formed closer links to organised crime networks. Trafficking gangs in Belfast, as in the rest of Northern Ireland, tend to be of Chinese or Eastern European origin, utilising local people as facilitators in their network.

In 2014, three nights of violence in East Belfast led to the Police Federation for Northern Ireland stating: "The gang culture has to be broken up so that people can go about their business without fear of being struck by a missile or intimidated."

(See below for information about sectarian gangs in Northern Ireland associated with The Troubles)

=== Birmingham ===
The Peaky Blinders were a criminal gang based in Birmingham, England, in the late 19th century and, to a lesser extent, in the early 20th century. Philip Gooderson, author of The Gangs of Birmingham, states that the Peaky Blinders originated as a specific gang, but the term later became a generic label. An earlier gang known as the Cheapside Sloggers had evolved in the 1870s, and the term "Sloggers" (meaning fighters) had already become a generic local label for street gangs when the Peaky Blinders emerged at the end of the century in Adderley Street, in the Bordesley and Small Heath areas, which was an extremely deprived slum section of Birmingham at the time. The Peaky Blinders were distinguished by their sartorial style, unlike earlier gangs. Notable members included David Taylor (imprisoned for carrying a gun at 13 years old), "baby-faced" Harry Fowles, Ernest Haynes and Stephen McNickle.

Early in the 20th century, one of the Birmingham gangs known as the Brummagem Boys (Brummagem being slang for Birmingham) began to spread their criminal network from the streets of Birmingham to around the country. Helped by greatly improved transport, for the first time, regional gangs were able to expand beyond the streets that bred them. The new connecting railway between Birmingham and London meant they could target the racecourse riches of the country's capital.

Following the Handsworth riots in 1985, young people banded together in groups which soon turned to petty crime and robbery. By the late 1980s, the Johnson Crew, named after their Johnsons Café hang-out, controlled the drugs market and nightclub security across some parts of Birmingham.

After a fall-out between members of the Johnson Crew, the Burger Bar Boys formed, taking their name from a Soho Road fast-food joint. This began a violent feud between the Johnsons and the Burger Bar Boys, which was resolved in a truce instigated by Matthias "Shabba" Thompson in 2010, with assistance from documentary maker Penny Woolcock. The process of forming the truce was captured in the Channel 4 documentary, One Mile Away. Following the truce, violent crime fell by 50% in the B6 postcode area and 30% in B21.

The increasingly collaborative relationship between the two gangs has led to some in the media describing them as more akin to a "super gang", seeking to establish a greater national network of organised crime rather than controlling their post-code areas. Other reports suggest both gangs are effectively inactive, and there is no "super gang".

However, 20 shootings in mid-2015 onwards were linked to the feud between the Burger Bar Boys and the Johnson Crew, suggesting any truce is no longer active and the gang rivalry has been renewed.

See also:

- Peaky Blinders
- Birmingham Boys
- Murder of Letisha Shakespeare and Charlene Ellis

=== Glasgow ===
The history of Glasgow gangs can be traced back to the 18th century, although the first media reference to Glasgow gangs was not until the 1870s, with the acknowledgement of the Penny Mobs. It has been suggested that the rise in Glasgow gangs from the 1850s was a result of an influx in Irish immigration which included those from traditional Irish fighting gangs such as the Caravats and Shanavests. By the 1920s many Glasgow gangs were widely viewed as fighting gangs rather than criminal gangs, although there were widespread reports of extortion and protection rackets, particularly in the city's East End and South Side. By the 1930s, Glasgow had acquired a reputation throughout Britain as a hotbed of gang violence and was regarded at the time as Britain's answer to Chicago, the epicenter of America's most violent warfare between organized crime. The gangs at this time were also referred to as Glasgow razor gangs, named after their weapon of choice.

One of Glasgow's most notorious gangs were the Billy Boys, a sectarian anti-Catholic gang, who were formed in 1924 by William Fullerton after he was attacked by a group of Catholic youths. Many gangs in the East End of Glasgow (such as the Billy Boys' rivals, the Norman Conks) were both sectarian and territorial, whereas in other districts they were primarily territorial.

The gang culture prevalent in the older, central areas of the city such as the Gorbals which became overcrowded and substandard in living conditions, did not disappear when these areas were cleared and redeveloped following World War II with many of the inhabitants rehoused either in clusters of tower blocks or in large peripheral overspill estates like Easterhouse; instead, as the job opportunities became limited in the post-industrial age, the structural flaws, planning mistakes and related social issues became apparent in the schemes as the years passed, and heroin addiction spread throughout the city, new gangs (in addition to some which remained in the original areas) formed in the modern environments and remained prominent for decades, particularly in Glasgow's many areas of deprivation and poor health where generations of young people suffered in childhood and found themselves with little to occupy their lives as teenagers other than a cycle of thrilling but pointless collective recreational violence (usually fuelled by alcohol) against similar groups from neighbouring districts. This lifestyle was depicted years later in films such as Small Faces and Neds. Some of these young men moved into other criminal enterprises, including the operation of lucrative van routes in the city's East End "schemes" during the 1980s trading in stolen property and drugs, which were controlled by gangsters such as Tam McGraw, with the resulting "ice cream" turf war eventually culminating in the deaths of a family.

An Evening Times report in 2008 stated that there were 170 gangs in Glasgow whilst an earlier report in 2006 included a map showing the location and a list of Glasgow gangs. Along with incidents from other origins including domestic violence and organised crime, the street gangs' behaviour contributed to Glasgow being declared the "murder capital of Europe" in the mid-2000s. Gangs in Glasgow – some involved in the supply of drugs, housebreakings and other illegal activity but most simply a mob with minimal leadership structure, focused on enhancing their local reputation for notoriety and defending their "bit" (territory) – marked their territory with tags or graffiti, and adopted a particular style of dress and speech in each era, being defined as 'ned culture'. The majority of large-scale fights were organised in advance by phone calls, text messages and later by online contact, but at all times of the day rival neighbourhoods became "no-go areas" for gang members as well those young people who were not involved in the violence but could be identified as residing in another area.

The habitual carrying of knives and other weapons was common wherever the fear of attack was present, with serious and tragic consequences often resulting from confrontations when they did occur. Several campaigns were launched by law enforcement and government agencies to discourage the possession of weapons, including a 2009 programme of checks on buses heading to the city centre, where the gangs would meet to fight when they left their own territory. An earlier campaign of the 1990s, "Operation Blade", had initially appeared to produce results before the levels of weapon use and violence soon returned to previous levels and thereafter increased. Not all murders were gang-related, but the prevailing culture in the city caused weapons to be carried as a matter of course and, in combination with the abuse of alcohol, serious incidents to result from often trivial disputes.

The latter years of the 20th century saw an increase in Pakistani gangs, particularity in the South of Glasgow (e.g. Pollokshields). Pakistani gangs came to wider attention following the racially motivated murder of Kriss Donald by local men of Pakistani origin in 2004. During that period, in the wake of the Donald murder, as well as a perception that asylum seekers who had been housed in empty properties in some of Glasgow's most run-down areas were being given priority over locals, some of the teenage gangs in those areas styled themselves as "nazis".

In the decade following the publication of the Evening Times reports, the number of young people involved in "young teams" in Glasgow and the number of serious violent incidents recorded as a result of their activities reduced substantially; in 2016, contributors to an article in the same newspaper suggested the links to gang identity were deeply embedded in local communities and unlikely to entirely disappear for many years, but that measures to combat the problems such as the police-led Violence Reduction Unit (which engaged with existing gang members, encouraging them to examine the negative consequences of their behaviour, to seek positive connections with their "enemies" such as Friday evening football games and outdoor pursuits, and to provide opportunities for training and employment as an alternative to the lifestyle they had known) had been effective to a noticeable extent.

Other external factors such as an increased availability of advanced internet-enabled gaming technology and the widespread use of social media among youngsters – which were acknowledged as having their own associated problems such as social isolation and online bullying, as well as allowing the "young teams" a platform to boast of their exploits and taunt rivals – also contributed to a general reduction in the number of local teenagers regularly out roaming the streets bored and seeking companionship or confrontation, with those who did openly express an affiliation to a violent gang more likely to face a negative reaction from the majority of their peers than in the past. In the wake of a rise in knife crime in England and Wales, particularly in London, in the 2010s, it was reported that those areas were studying the approaches taken by Scotland in tackling the issue.

However, it was recognised by the VRU that only around half of all violent incidents which occurred were reported to the police (as compared with figures from hospital admissions and other research), while violence related to organised crime in parts of the city (many of those involved having "graduated" from the local street gangs) remained a significant issue. A 2020 novel by Graeme Armstrong, The Young Team, narrated by a gang member in the local dialect, focuses on the "ned culture" of the region in the early 21st century (albeit set in Airdrie, North Lanarkshire a few miles east of Glasgow rather than in the city itself). In October 2023, Armstrong wrote and presented a three-part BBC Scotland documentary series, Street Gangs exploring Scottish gang culture including the recent impact of social media and drill music / roadman culture, and his own lived experience as a gang member 15 years earlier.

=== Liverpool ===
Street gangs in Liverpool have been in existence since the mid-19th century. There were also various sectarian "political" gangs based in and around Liverpool during this period. Dr Michael Macilwee of Liverpool John Moores University and author of the 2006 The Gangs of Liverpool stated, "You can learn lessons from the past and it's fascinating to compare the newspaper headlines of today with those from the late 1800s. The issues are exactly the same. People were worried about rising youth crime and the influence of 'penny dreadfuls' on people's behaviour. Like today, some commentators demanded longer prison sentences and even flogging while others called for better education and more youth clubs."

In the early 1980s Liverpool was tagged by the media as "Smack City" or "Skag City" after it experienced an explosion in organised gang crime and heroin abuse, especially within the city's more deprived areas. At the same time several criminal gangs began developing into drug dealing cartels in the city, including the Liverpool Mafia, which was the first such cartel to develop in the UK. As drugs became increasingly valuable, large distribution networks were developed with cocaine producers in South America, including the Cali cartel. Over time, several Liverpool gangsters became increasingly wealthy, including Colin 'Smigger' Smith, who had an estimated fortune of £200m and Curtis 'Cocky' Warren, whose estimated wealth once saw him listed on the Sunday Times Rich List.

It has also been suggested that distribution networks for illicit drugs within Ireland and the UK, and even allegedly some Mediterranean holiday resorts, have become controlled by various Liverpool gangs.

A report in the Observer newspaper written by journalist Peter Beaumont entitled Gangsters put Liverpool top of gun league (28 May 1995), observed that turf wars had erupted within Liverpool. The high levels of violence in the city came to a head in 1996 when, following the shooting of gangster David Ungi, six shootings occurred in seven days, prompting Merseyside Police to become one of the first police forces in the country to openly carry weapons in the fight against gun crime. Official Home Office statistics revealed a total of 3,387 offences involving firearms had occurred in the Merseyside region during a four-year period between 1997 and 2001. It was revealed that Liverpool was the main centre for organised crime in the North of England.

In August 2007 the ongoing war between two rival gangs caused nationwide outrage, when innocent 11-year-old Rhys Jones was shot in the neck and died in his mother's arms in the car park of the Fir Tree pub in Croxteth Liverpool. On 16 December 2008, Sean Mercer was convicted of the murder and ordered to serve a minimum tariff of 22 years by trial judge Mr Justice Irwin.

=== London ===
London was the first city noted to have a major problem with criminal gangs, followed thereafter by US cities such as New York City, Chicago and Los Angeles. A number of street gangs were present in London during the 20th century, many in the East End, often referred to as Mobs, including The Yiddishers, Hoxton Mob, Watney Streeters, Aldgate Mob, Whitechapel Mob, Bethnal Green Mob and the organised Italian Mob headed by Charles Sabini. The history of these gangs is well documented in "London's Underworld: Three centuries of vice and crime".

The Pall Mall Gazette released a research report on gangs and crime in England in 1888, they discuss the downfall and dissolution of a gang called the Skeleton Army a few years before hand, and include a collection of 9 gangs and their respective territories, gathered from contemporary police reports, which are as follows:

The Bandit Gangs of London – 1888
Gang Name	Territory
The Marylebone Gang	Lisson Grove
The Fitzroy Place Gang	Regent's Park
The Monkey Parade Gang	Whitechapel
The Black Gang	Union Street, Borough
The New Cut Gang	The New Cut, Lambeth
The Greengate Gang	City Road
The "Prince Arthur" Gang	Duke Street, Blackfriars
"The Gang of Roughs"	Norwood
The Jovial Thirty-Two	Upper Holloway

In February 2007, the BBC reported on an unpublished Metropolitan Police report on London's gang culture, identifying 169 separate groups (see Ghetto Boys, Tottenham Mandem and Peckham Boys), with more than a quarter said to have been involved in murders. The report's accuracy has been questioned by some London Boroughs for being inaccurate in places and the existence of certain gangs on the list could not be substantiated. The Centre for Social Justice identifies the Gangs in London website as a useful tool in creating an overall picture of London gangs, as highlighted in the report "Dying to Belong: An in depth review of street gangs in Britain", which was led by Conservative leader Iain Duncan Smith in 2009.

In February 2007, criminologist Dr John Pitts, from the University of Bedfordshire, said: "There are probably no more than 1,500 to 2,000 young people in gangs in all of London, but their impact is enormous". There is no methodology to suggest where this number came from and how it was obtained. Furthermore, in December 2007 in a report written by Pitts on Lambeth gangs, he claims that the dominant gang (PDC from Angell Town) "boasts 2,500 members". Probably a more accurate estimation for gang membership, although dated, can be found in the 2004 Home Office document "Delinquent Youth Groups and Offending Behaviour". The report, using a methodology developed by American gang experts and practitioners, estimated that 6% of young people aged 10–19 were classified as belonging to a delinquent youth group, although based on the most stringent criteria this was 4%.

There is a modern history of London gangs dating from the 1970s although many of them emerged from sub-cultures such as punks, Rastas and football hooligans. Two well known subcultures involved in violent clashes during the Notting Hill riots in the 1950s, Teddy Boys and Rudeboys, could be labelled gangs by modern media. Amongst the London gangs whose history does go back to the 1970s are the Peckham Boys and Tottenham Mandem, both predominantly or entirely black. Native British gangs remain active while there are several Asian gangs in London, such as the Brick Lane Massive whom are predominantly of Bangladeshi descent.

A 2014 Met Police gang database for London estimated that 78.2% of members were Black, 12.8% were white, 6.5% were Asian (Pakistani, Indian and Bangladeshis), 2.2% were Middle Eastern/Arabs and under 1% were East Asian or of unknown-ethnicity. However, this survey was criticised for being weighted by institutional racism. In the early 2000s, Ross Kemp's documentary on London Gangs discussed numerous ethnic gangs in the city, with one example being Tamil gangs in Croydon and Wembley that had been active such as the "Wembley Boys" and the "Tamil Snake Gang".

London gangs are increasingly marking their territory with gang graffiti, usually a gang name and the UK postcode area or housing estate they identify with; "postcode wars" is a nickname for their fights. In some cases they may tag the street road signs in their area with an identified gang colour, as can be seen in Edmonton. This is not a new phenomenon and has been practised by many London gangs in the past although it has become a more integral part of the modern gang culture. Many gangs have a strong sense of belonging to their local areas and often take their names from the housing estates, districts and postal code areas where they are located. In some areas the post codes act as rival gang boundaries, although this is not a general rule as there can be rival gangs present within the same postal area as well as gangs that occupy multiple postal areas.

In 2018, researchers from London South Bank University found that gangs in the London borough of Waltham Forest that used to be organised around post code rivalries had moved beyond territorial disputes to focus on profit-making activities like drug dealing. They cite James Densley's gang evolution model, which details how gangs progress from recreational goals and activities like defending post codes to financial goals and activities like drug dealing. Densley concludes that fully evolved gangs "resemble not just crime that is organized, but organized crime". Densley also found that gangs in London also used handsigns and gang tattoos to denote gang membership. Some gangs in London are motivated by religion, as is the case with Muslim Patrol. However, profits arising from drugs and other criminal activity is a significant motivator for many gangs.

=== Manchester ===
The first recorded gangs in Manchester were "Scuttlers", which were youth gangs that recruited boys and girls between 14 and 21 years of age. They became prominent amongst the slums during the second half of the 19th century, but had mostly disappeared by the beginning of the 20th century. In the mid-1980s, a growth in violence amongst Black British youths from the west side of the Alexandra Park Estate in South Manchester and their rivals, West Indians living to the north of the city, in Cheetham Hill began to gain media attention. The city has sometimes been dubbed in the media as "Gangchester" and "Gunchester".

The gang wars in Manchester first gained national media attention in the Guardian newspaper on 7 June 1988. In the article, Clive Atkinson, deputy head of Greater Manchester Police CID said, "We are dealing with a black mafia which is a threat to the whole community".

The gang culture spread into many deprived areas in South Manchester. A gang-related crime occurred on 9 September 2006, in Moss Side, where Jessie James, a 15-year-old schoolboy was shot dead in the early hours of the morning. His shooting is said to have been the result of a mistaken identity for a rival gang member. To this day his murderer(s) have not been found.

In April 2009, eleven members of the Gooch Gang were found guilty of a number of charges ranging from murder to drugs offences. The Gooch Gang had a long-standing rivalry with the equally well known Doddington gang. The Gooch gang operated with a tiered structure. On the top were the gang's leaders, Colin Joyce and Lee Amos, and below them were members controlling the supply and distribution of drugs to the street dealers at the bottom. The gang was earning an estimated £2,000 a day, with street dealers allowed to keep £100 a day for themselves. After 2001 when Joyce and Amos were sent to prison on firearms charges, there followed a 92% drop in gun crime in central Manchester. Official gun enabled crime figures show a 17% reduction in Manchester when comparing 2005/06 (1,200 offences) and 2006/07 (993 offences). However, this was followed by an increase of 17% in 2007/08 (1,160 offences) compared to 2006/07. In 2009 shootings were reported as falling by 82% compared with the previous year.

In addition to this, many ethnic gangs can be found within Manchester as well, Black and Pakistani gangs being the most prominent, founded in areas such as Rochdale and Oldham where criminal charges range from carrying firearms to murder. Manchester is also home to the Inter City Jibbers, an element within the city's main hooligan gang that uses football hooliganism as a cover for acquisitive forms of crime. According to former Manchester United hooligan Colin Blaney in his autobiography Undesirables, members of the gang have been involved in serious forms of crime, such as drug smuggling from Latin America and the Caribbean, carrying out armed robberies and committing robberies on drug dealers. In an interview with Vice, members of the gang spoke of connections with Liberian drug smuggling cartels and convictions for offences including armed robbery, credit card fraud and sale of class A drugs.

== Drug gangs ==
A number of the criminal gangs in the United Kingdom specialise in the importation, production and sale of illicit drugs. Of the 2,800 gangs identified within the United Kingdom it is estimated that 60% are involved in drugs. Amongst them are the Yardies, also known as Posses in America, who are generally associated with crack cocaine. In 2003, it was reported that Yardie drug gangs were present in 36 of the 43 police service areas in England and Wales. One of the more prominent were the Aggi Crew in Bristol.

In 1998, six members of the Aggi Crew were imprisoned after being found in possession of over £1 million worth of crack-cocaine.

There were raids across the city which was the latest phase of Operation Atrium, launched in 2001 to clamp down on drug-related crime in Bristol by disrupting organised gangs. More than 960 people have been arrested in the past 18 months. In 2009 Olympian and judo expert James Waithe was convicted of drugs offences, having been an enforcer for drug ring that made £50 million annually.

Asian drug gangs, usually of Pakistani and Tamil descent are also present in the United Kingdom. Notable Tamil gangs include Harrow Tamils and Wembley Tamils. Pakistani gangs have been recorded to be associated with the importation and distribution of heroin and can be found in Luton, Bradford, Birmingham, Manchester, Huddersfield, Slough, Bedford, and Middlesbrough. Drug squad officers in 2003 claimed that Asian gangs were actively seeking to corner the heroin market.

In other reports it has been suggested that Turkey replaced Pakistan and Afghanistan as the most important transit point for heroin, and it is estimated that 80% of heroin intercepted by British authorities belongs to Turkish gangs, which previously belonged to Pakistani and Afghan gangs. A recent spate of murders in London in 2009 have been linked to a heroin drugs war involving rival Turkish and Kurdish gangs in north London. It is believed that the feud is between two organised drug gangs, the Turkish "Tottenham Boys" and the "Bombarcilar" or "Bombers" from Hackney. The Bombers were led by Abdullah Babysin who was said to be Britain's largest importer of heroin; he was convicted in 2006.

== Women and gangs ==
Although most assumptions surrounding gang culture in the UK surround male-dominated narratives, females also played a role in gangs in Britain in the late 19th to early 20th centuries. Society saw women as conspirators, supporters, and even perpetuators of gang crime in the late nineteenth century. In 1898, the Manchester Guardian wrote an article that said, “Girls incited conflicts between the gangs and were thus responsible for the majority of scuttling affrays.” This article reflects how women were viewed as sexual objects, causing a lot of the fights and violence that occurred between gangs.

While historians such as Stephen Humphries support this claim that women played a supporting role in gangs, Andrew Davies argues that women played a much more active one. One of the most famous gangs of the early 20th century was an all-female gang in London called the Forty Elephants. By 1890, the Forty Elephants chose their first "queen" and established themselves as free from male control. Led by Alice Diamond during its height in 1915, the gang was notorious for stealing expensive clothing, partying among the wealthy, engaging in violent robberies, and for being romantically involved with other gang leaders around London.

When it came to court, magistrates treated women's involvement in gangs differently to that of men. The concern over female crime related to the deviation from typical notions of femininity and morality, thus women typically received lesser sentences than men. Due to the conventional idea of femininity that saw women as weaker than men, many courts would have believed it impossible to view women as orchestrators of such crime. Most women were assumed to have played a supporting role.

== Organised crime groups ==
Britain has a number of traditional organised crime firms or local British crime families. Some of the most well known include the Kray twins, The Richardson Gang and Terry Adams Clerkenwell crime syndicate in London. Outside the capital there are the Noonans in Manchester, Thomas McGraw from Glasgow and Curtis Warren from Liverpool who are amongst some of the most infamous.

By the 1980s the Irish Republican Army had capitalised on long established Irish Organised Crime in the UK to effectively gain control of organised crime, the drug trade and even copyright piracy to fund its terrorism. With the Good Friday Agreement many former IRA and other Northern Irish paramilitaries moved into organised crime. They were largely displaced even in Northern Ireland by organised criminal gangs from Eastern Europe and the Balkans in the 2000s.

The more established British and Irish organised criminal gangs were no longer able to compete in the intense rivalry for the drug trade in the UK major cities, moved to smaller towns, establishing the so called county lines. In 2018 there were 4,629 criminal gangs and syndicates in Britain, employing 33,598 professional gangsters. The figure of 4,629 means there are more gangs in Britain than staff members of the NCA. 33,598 career criminals translates to more gangsters in Britain than belong to all three big Italian mafias. Organised crime in the UK generates annual revenues of £37bn, or 1.8% of GDP.

== Sectarian gangs ==
Sectarian, or "political" gangs have featured in British cities such as Liverpool in England, Glasgow in Scotland and Belfast in Northern Ireland. Belfast has been the capital of Northern Ireland since its establishment in 1921 following the Government of Ireland Act 1920. Since its emergence as a major city, it had been the scene of various episodes of sectarian conflict between its Roman Catholic and Protestant populations. The Ulster Protestant Association is said to have provided many members of the murder gangs active in Belfast during 1921–22. Other Protestant gangs active at that time were: the Imperial Guards, Crawford's Tigers and the Cromwell Clubs. These opposing groups in this conflict are now often termed republican and loyalist respectively, although they are also referred to as "nationalist" and "unionist".

The most recent example of this is known as the Troubles - a civil conflict that raged from c.1969 to the late 1990s. Belfast saw some of the worst of the Troubles in Northern Ireland, particularly in the 1970s, with rival paramilitary groups forming on both sides. Bombing, assassination and street violence formed a backdrop to life throughout the Troubles. The Provisional IRA detonated twenty-two bombs, all in a confined area in the city centre in 1972, on what is known as "Bloody Friday", killing nine people.

The IRA also killed hundreds of other civilians and members of the security forces. Loyalist paramilitaries the Ulster Volunteer Force (UVF) and Ulster Defence Association (UDA) claimed that the killings they carried out were in retaliation to the PIRA campaign. Most of their victims were Roman Catholic civilians unconnected to the Provisional IRA. A particularly notorious group, based on the Shankill Road in the mid-1970s became known as the Shankill Butchers. In all, over one thousand five hundred people were killed in political violence in the city from 1969 until 2001. Part of the legacy of the Troubles is that both republican and loyalist paramilitary groups in Belfast have become involved in organised crime and racketeering.

== Debate surrounding the impact of gangs ==
Historically, societal fears of gangs have centered around frameworks which argue that effects like increased mass production, consumption, democracy, and communication lead to the rise of organised crime groups. There was a general consensus among the middle classes that there was increasing violence among working-class men due to these forces during the late 19th century. Newspapers used inflammatory language to convey a sense of lawlessness and excessive violence among working-class towns which added to these growing assumptions. The widely held belief of British intellectuals in the 20th century was that gangs reflected the working-class rejection of middle-class traditional values and norms. This view contributed to the way experts studied gangs throughout the 20th century and served as proof of innate immorality around working-class citizens.

Two historians have done extensive research in this field and represent two different views of the underlying causes of the rise in gang culture between the late nineteenth and early twentieth centuries. Stephen Humphries argues that these early groups can be seen as results of “social crime”. For the working class, they viewed these crimes as righteous and justified against a society that had left them to struggle. It was therefore fair for them to steal what they had been deprived of. According to Humphries, gangs were a way for the working-class youth to respond to feelings of insignificance that came with living in a large, uniform industrial town with no way of escape.

Petty crimes were a way to respond to all of the top-down authority they were receiving from factory managers, teachers, the police, and the government. His analysis of interviews with former gang members led him to the idea that gangs allowed working-class youths to feel rebellious and also express a need to resist the monotonous nature of industrial towns. Building on this idea, Andrew Davies argues that the concept of masculinity among working-class men prompted this behaviour, and was a way for members to prove themselves to their peers. He connects acts of violence committed in the household to idealised criminals in popular culture at the time that would have contributed to the working-class idea of masculinity. However, in other works he notes how many women took part in organised crimes, thus proving that this idea was not the only motive of gang crime.

In 2014, the Runnymede Trust suggested that despite the well-rehearsed public discourse around modern youth gangs and "gang culture":

We actually know very little about 'gangs' in the UK: about how 'a gang' might be defined or understood, about what being in 'a gang' means... We know still less about how 'the gang' links to levels of youth violence.

== See also ==
- British firms (organised crime)
- Triads in the United Kingdom
- Crime in the United Kingdom
