= Glasgow razor gangs =

1920s–30s street gangs in parts of Glasgow

Glasgow in the 1930s

The Glasgow razor gangs were violent gangs that existed in the East End and South Side of Glasgow, Scotland in the late 1920s and 1930s and were named after their weapon of choice. H. Kingsley Long's novel No Mean City (1935) contains a fictionalised account of these gangs.

== History ==
The tradition of gang formation in Glasgow stretched back at least to the 1880s, and gang rivalries appear to have derived a momentum of their own during the late-nineteenth century, irrespective of short-term economic trends, both in Glasgow and in other British municipalities. One of the original gangs to coin the Glasgow smile was the St Mungies Warriors in 1925.

Religious sectarianism had been rife in Scotland for centuries; however, the centre of it all was in Glasgow. Originally, Glasgow had been mainly Protestant, but in the nineteenth and twentieth centuries, large numbers of Roman Catholic Irish immigrants came to the west coast of Scotland; drawn by jobs in the local industries.

Protestants became irritated at the increasing unemployment rate and blamed the influx of Catholics. Between November 1930 and May 1935, Glasgow's unemployment rate was between 25 and 33%. While it would be misleading to claim that mass unemployment was the sole cause of gang conflicts in inter-war Glasgow, the advent of mass unemployment does appear to have led to two significant new patterns in gang formation. First, as unemployment peaked locally in the early-1930s and long-term unemployment posed increasing concern, it became more common for young men in their twenties, and even thirties, to remain active members of street gangs, some of which appear to have provided an important focus for jobless men.

In the 1920s, Glasgow became known for its gang violence, particularly in the Gorbals area, leading to the portrayal of Glasgow as one of Britain's most violent cities. Relations between the gangs and the police were violent on both sides, as police officers and local youths contested ownership of the streets. Throughout the 1930s, the police in Glasgow maintained a network of paid informers, including bar staff employed in public houses in the poorer districts of the South Side and the East End, in order to gather information concerning the planned activities of local street gangs.

Confrontations between gangs and police officers frequently followed police attempts to take gang members into custody. For example, in July 1939, a major disturbance erupted in the Gorbals as the Beehive Boys and the South Side Stickers reportedly joined forces to confront police officers who were taking two prisoners to the police station. 'Hundreds' of local people gathered at the main street corners, and police reinforcements were stoned as they arrived in Thistle Street in squad cars and vans. As the disturbance spread, shop windows were smashed, and police officers were forced to stand guard to prevent looting.

== Gang rivalry ==
Throughout the 1920s and 1930s, most of Glasgow's street gangs were territorially based in working-class districts. This was reflected in the choice of names such as the Bridgeton Billy Boys, the Calton Entry, and the South Side Stickers. The Beehive Boys took their name from a draper's shop situated at the corner of Thistle Street and Cumberland Street in the Gorbals.

Many gangs were active in the city; however, two of the most infamous were the former Penny Mobs, the Bridgeton Billy Boys and the Norman Conks. By the end of the 1930s, more gangs such as the Beehive Boys, the San Toi, Tongs, the Fleet, Govan Team, Den Toi, Bal Toi, Drummy, Provy, Aggro, Skinheads, Tiny Torran Toi and Bingo Boys had come into existence.

Glasgow gangs were divided between those that were solely territorial and those that combined territorial and sectarian allegiances, such as the Protestant Bridgeton (or Billy) Boys who frequently clashed with the Roman Catholic Norman Conks in the East End of the city. The Billy Boys would meet at Bridgeton Cross, their claimed territory. The Norman Conks would gather in a street that was roughly half a kilometre south. The fact that the two were so close geographically caused many fights.

The Billy Boys were founded and led by Billy Fullerton, a former member of the British Fascists. Fullerton also later became a member of the British Union of Fascists in the 1930s. The Billy Boys adopted a militaristic style of behaviour, marching on parades, forming their own bands, composing their own songs and music, and all dressed in a similar manner. The Billy Boys also formed a junior group whose members were teenagers called the Derry Boys.

In the early 1930s, gang numbers started to decrease, mainly due to the work of the chief constable of the City of Glasgow Police, Sir Percy Sillitoe. Brought in due to his work with similar gangs in Sheffield, his tactic was to recruit big, strong men from rural areas and the Scottish Highlands. Due also to the start of World War II, the Billy boys went into decline in the late 1930s.

== Later gangs ==
In the late 1960s a moral panic swept Glasgow, with media and police attention focused on new youth gangs that were younger, more violent and more dangerous than the Glasgow razor gangs of the 1920s and 1930s. By the turn of the 21st century, Glasgow had the highest number of street gangs in the UK. In 2006, there were as many 'young teams' in Greater Glasgow as in London, the UK capital, which is geographically six times as large. The numbers of young people involved in gangs and the violence inflicted in statistical terms reduced significantly over the next decade, due to various factors including successful initiatives to engage with gang members by organisations such as the Violence Reduction Unit. However, organised crime groups remained a significant problem in the city.

== See also ==
- Brighton razor gangs
- Patrick Carraher
- Peaky Blinders
- Glasgow gangs
- Glasgow smile
- Razor gangs (Sydney, 1920s - 1930s)
