= Tongland (gang area) =

Local nickname for the area of Calton, Glasgow

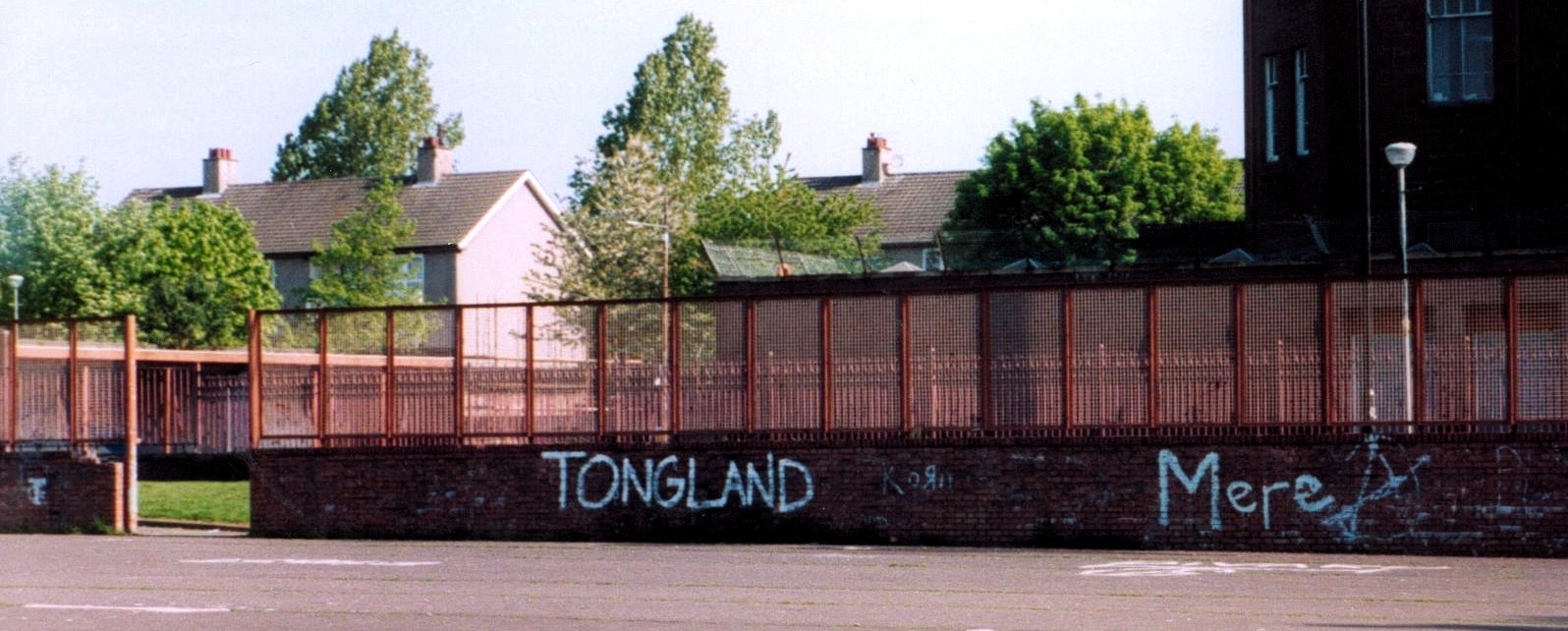
Tongland graffiti in the Calton area of Glasgow, 2004

Tongland is a local nickname for the area of Calton, Glasgow controlled in the 1960s by a violent Scottish teenage gang called the Real Calton Tongs. The Tongs financed themselves using a protection racket, levying money on shops within their territory, and they marked that territory out in graffiti with their slogan "Tongs Ya Bass".

== Background ==
There is no agreement on the origin of the name. One version (which may be apocryphal) is told thus: "In the 1960s, in an East-End cinema near Fielden Street, some of a local Calton gang led by one McCabe were watching a film, The Terror of the Tongs. about the Chinese secret society;

"...when McCabe shouted out 'Tongs ya Bass' for the first time. McCabe consequently renamed himself Terror McCabe".

Calton in the 19th century was ruled by the brutal "San Toys" gang, and that name was written with wildly varied spellings:, such as 'San Toi' in the 1930s.

"Ya bass" is generally taken as Glasgow slang for "you bastard", though it has been proposed it could be the Gaelic war cry aigh bas meaning "battle and die". Another Glasgow gang slogan was "Spur ya Bass" (this was the name of one of the two rival gangs from the Barrowfield area). "Tongs Ya Bass" arguably became Glasgow's unofficial motto in the 1960s and 1970s.

Tongland appears in Gillies MacKinnon's 1995 movie Small Faces, set in the 1960s, although the setting for the gang's territory is actually the tower blocks of Sighthill. The Tongs and other gangs' power over the area and their decline in the 1970s is described in Janey Godley's 2005 autobiography, Handstands in the Dark. The Scottish Tongs are referenced in Adam Ant's song "Crackpot History (and the right to lie)". The lyrics read: "Pumping is a splendid gift, I hope you will catch my drift. Some like pumping in the lift, just like the Scottish Tongs."

== See also ==
- Billy Boys
- Gangs in the United Kingdom#Glasgow
- Norman Conks
