= Brighton razor gangs =

1930s and 1940s English youth gangs

The Brighton razor gangs were groups of razor-wielding youths involved (straight razors became the gang's signature tool for violence) in racketeering on the local racecourses in the 1930s and 1940s. They formed the background for Graham Greene's novel Brighton Rock. Gangs operating in Brighton included the Sabini gang from London's Clerkenwell area.

For twenty years, the local underworld was dominated by the Clerkenwell-based organization of Charles Sabini, also known as "Darby." Born to Italian and English parents, Sabini built a massive operation that included around 300 members, utilizing both local criminals and Sicilian mercenaries. Although he was known for his physical intimidation, his empire was sustained primarily through deep-seated political and legal connections. His alliances with law enforcement and the judiciary provided vital cover during conflicts with rival gangs.

== See also ==
- Glasgow razor gangs
