= Calton, Glasgow =

District in the Scottish city of Glasgow

Coordinates: 55.853397°N 4.233212°W

Calton: Scottish Gaelic: A' Challtainn; Scots: Caltoun
- Location within the Glasgow City council area Location within Scotland
- OS grid reference: NS603645
- Council area: Glasgow City
- Lieutenancy area: Glasgow
- Country: Scotland
- Sovereign state: United Kingdom
- Post town: GLASGOW
- Postcode district: G40
- Dialling code: 0141
- Police: Scotland
- Fire: Scottish
- Ambulance: Scottish
- UK Parliament: Glasgow Central
- Scottish Parliament: Glasgow Shettleston

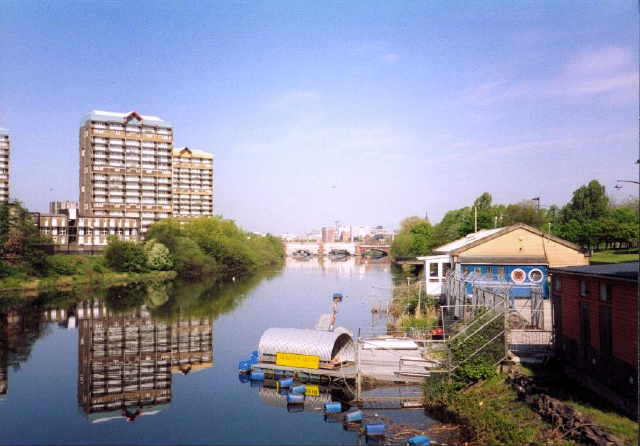
The River Clyde by the Calton. 2004 photo, with the Hutchesontown 'B' tower blocks in the Gorbals on the opposite bank

Calton (Scottish Gaelic: A' Challtainn, lit. 'the hazel wood', Scots: Caltoun), known locally as The Calton, is a district in Glasgow. It is situated north of the River Clyde, south of the neighbouring district of Dennistoun, and just to the east of the city centre. Calton's most famous landmark is the Barras street market and the Barrowland Ballroom, one of Glasgow's principal musical venues.

No official definition of Calton's boundaries exist; notionally it is the roughly trapezoidal area bounded by the River Clyde to the south, Abercromby Street to the east (where it borders both Camlachie and Bridgeton), and the City Union Line railway to the north and High Street/Saltmarket to the west.

== History ==
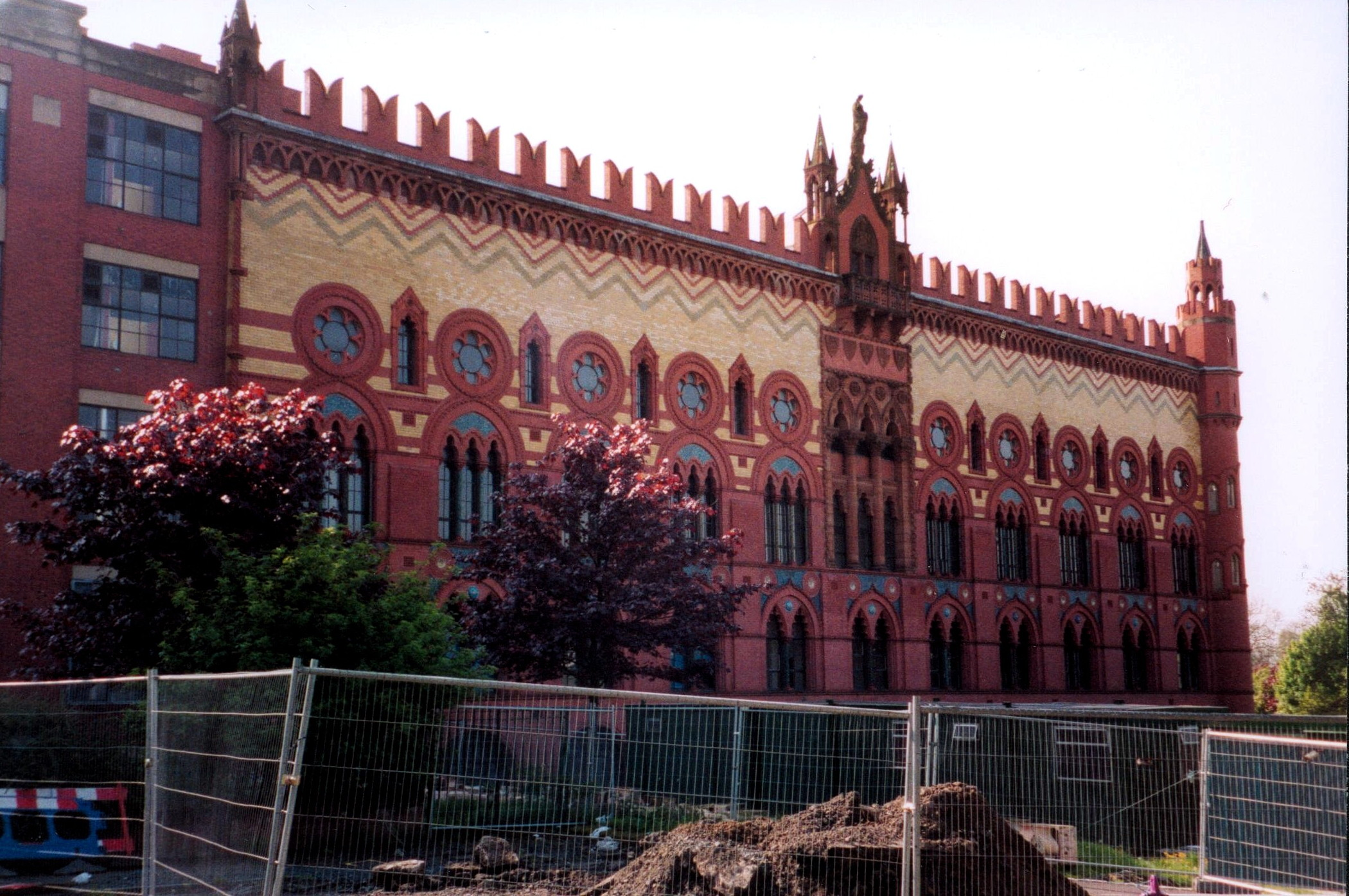
The former Templeton's Carpet Factory in the Calton, designed to resemble the Doge's Palace in Venice. Photo taken 2004.

The area was a Burgh of Barony from 1817 to 1846, when it was annexed to Glasgow.

The lands of Blackfaulds, on which Calton now stands, originally formed part of the lands of the Archbishopric of Glasgow, but were annexed to The Crown in 1587. In 1705 the owner, John Walkinshaw, began to feu the lands of Blackfaulds (part of the Barrowfield estate) on which the old village of Calton was built, and in 1817 a charter was granted, erecting Calton into a Burgh. During the area's time as an independent burgh, there were four Provosts of Calton:

- Robert Struthers (1817–1818)
- Nathaniel Stevenson (1818–1839)
- Robert Bartholomew (1839–1843)
- William Bankier (1843–1846)

=== The Calton martyrs ===
The area became known for its weaving industry. On 30 June 1787, a meeting of Calton weavers was held on Glasgow Green. Their wages had dropped because of the increased importation of cheaper foreign textiles. Most of the workers decided to take strike action, although some accepted lower wages and carried on working. The dispute came to a head on 3 September 1787: when violence erupted after some striking weavers tried to seize materials from weavers who had carried on working.

The military were called in and a detachment of the 39th Regiment of Foot opened fire on the demonstrators. Six of the men killed at the scene were locally called 'martyrs' and some of them were buried in the Calton Cemetery off the main London Road. The families of the men could not afford a headstone although, a century later, a memorial was raised to commemorate their actions.

== Social problems ==
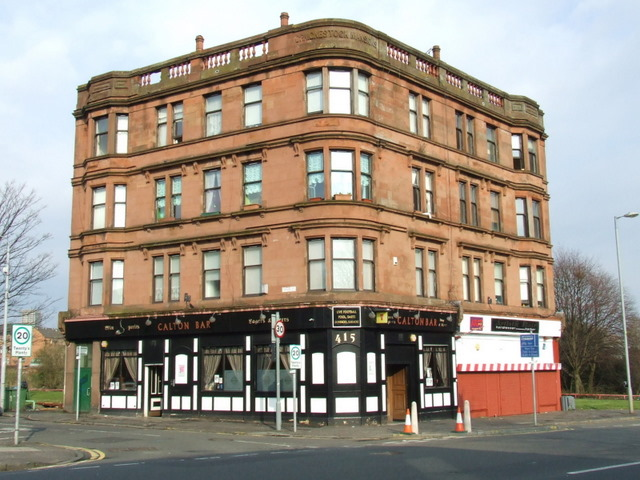
The Calton Bar on the London Road in 2008

Comedian Janey Godley, in her 2005 autobiography Handstands in the Dark, wrote about the 14 years she spent running a Calton pub, the Weavers Inn (formerly the Nationalist Bar, now the Calton Bar). Her book details life there in the 1980s and 1990s, a time when the area became notorious for heroin abuse and when urban renewal began.

Calton is an area of considerable poverty and multiple deprivation regarding; "current income, employment, health, education, skills and training, housing, geographic access and crime." In January 2006, a report into poverty in The Scotsman newspaper stated that "a child born in Calton... is three times as likely to suffer heart disease, four times as likely to be hospitalised and ten times as likely to grow up in a workless household than a child in the city's prosperous western suburbs". Calton has the lowest male life expectancy in Scotland. A BBC Scotland news report on 13 February 2006 pointed out that, partially due to poor diet, crime, alcohol and drug abuse, life expectancy in Calton is lower than in some areas of Iraq or the Gaza Strip. A news report in the 21 January 2006 edition of The Guardian newspaper gave the average lifespan of a person living in the Calton area as 53.9 years against a city average of 69 years and the Scottish average of 78. A 2008 World Health Organization report contrasted Calton's male life expectancy, reported as standing at 54, with that of nearby Lenzie, East Dunbartonshire, at 82. Most of the affordable housing is owned by Housing Associations with a high percentage of tenants on housing benefit (For example, Thenue Housing Association has approximately 75% of tenants on housing benefit). The Guardian writes that higher risk of dying before they are 65 (up to 30% in comparison with Liverpool and Manchester) occurred because of rehousing skilled workers (cream skimming) due to 1970s policy documents.

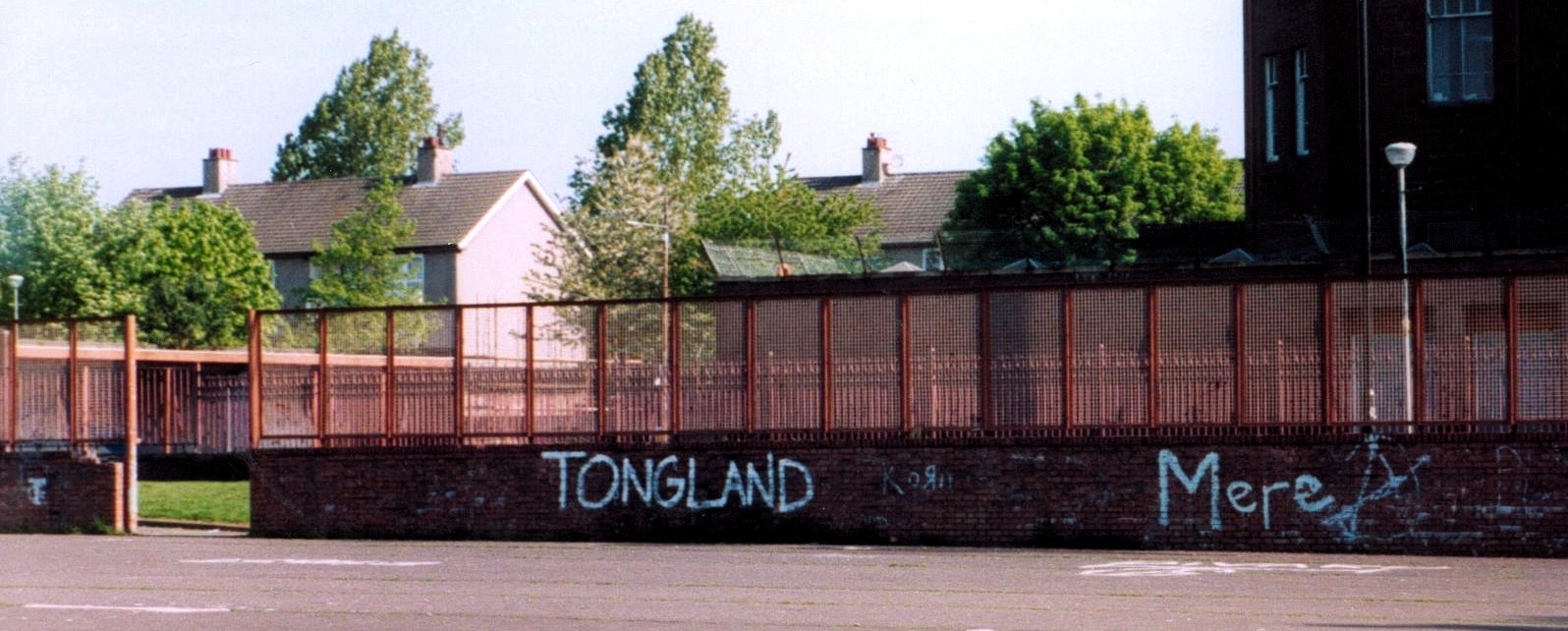
Tongland graffiti in the Calton. Photo taken 2004.

The area has experienced sectarian tensions for generations; it is a predominantly Catholic area (due to Irish immigration), and there are also Irish republican supporter groups present. This is reflected, albeit much declined in modern times, in gang and sectarian related graffiti, with the main gang being the Calton Tongs. In the 1960s, the Calton was known locally as Tongland (and still is by some), prominently marked out as such by graffiti. Tongland appears in Gillies MacKinnon's 1995 movie Small Faces. The gangs' power over the area and their decline in the 1970s is described in Handstands in the Dark.

== See also ==
- Saint Mary's, Calton (local Catholic Church)
- The Glasgow effect in reference to the low life expectancy of Glaswegians
