= Norman Conks =

Street gang active in Glasgow, Scotland

The Norman Conks (or Norman Conquerors) were a large Catholic sectarian street gang active in Glasgow. It was one of the popular Glasgow razor gangs, and was active from the 1880s to the 1960s, with its territory and most of their members based about the Catholic area of Norman Street in Bridgeton. They were initially a penny mob, but evolved into a larger, influential gang. They were often involved in street fighting with the Protestant Billy Boys of Bridgeton, but were on friendlier terms with the Calton Tongs who were also mostly Catholic. The gang included young women.

== See also ==
- Glasgow razor gangs
- Gangs in the United Kingdom#Glasgow
- Sectarianism in Glasgow
