= Percy Sillitoe =

British police and intelligence officer (1888–1962)

Sir Percy Sillitoe KBE DL
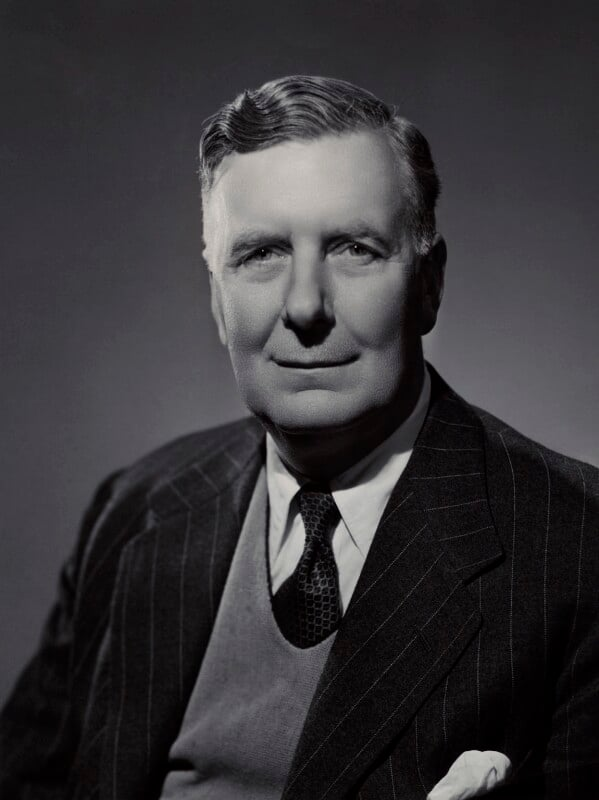
- Sillitoe in 1950
- Born: 22 May 1888; Tulse Hill, London, United Kingdom
- Died: 5 April 1962 (aged 73); Eastbourne, East Sussex, United Kingdom
- Occupation: Police officer
- Awards: KBE
- Espionage activity
- Allegiance: United Kingdom
- Service branch: MI5
- Service years: 1946–1953
- Rank: Director General of MI5

Sir Percy Joseph Sillitoe KBE DL (22 May 1888 – 5 April 1962) was a British police and intelligence officer. He was chief constable of several police forces, and changed the role of radios, civilian staff, and women police officers within the police. He was later Director General of MI5, the United Kingdom's internal security service, from 1946 to 1953.

== Life ==
Born in London, Sillitoe was educated at St Paul's Cathedral School (then St Paul's Cathedral Choir School). By 1908, he had become a Trooper in the British South Africa Police and, in 1911, transferred to the Northern Rhodesia Police. During the First World War, Sillitoe served in the East African campaign with the Northern Rhodesia Police. In 2009, it was revealed that he had had a relationship with Mary Museba, a local woman of the Bemba people, from the Abercorn District of Northern Rhodesia; they had a son, John Alexander Sillitoe, born in 1918.

After serving as a political officer in Tanganyika until 1920, Sillitoe returned to England with his family.

In 1923, Sillitoe was appointed Chief Constable of Chesterfield, a position he held for the next two years. After a further year as Chief Constable of the East Riding of Yorkshire in 1925, he became in 1926 the Chief Constable of Sheffield, where he was credited with authorising "reasonable force" to break the hold of criminal gangs.

Sillitoe was Chief Constable of City of Glasgow Police from 1931 to 1943, when he was credited with breaking the power of the notorious Glasgow razor gangs, made infamous in the novel No Mean City. During his time as chief constable of Glasgow, he was also credited with the introduction of wireless radios allowing communication between headquarters and vehicles (which had previously relied completely upon the use of police boxes), use of civilians in police-related roles, and the introduction of compulsory retirement after 30 years' service. Sillitoe is further credited with the introduction of the Sillitoe tartan, which is more commonly recognised as the checkered pattern, usually black-and-white, on police cap bands, originally based on that used by several Scottish regiments on their Balmoral and Glengarry headdresses.

In 1944 Sillitoe was made the chief constable of Kent; he employed Barbara Denis de Vitré to lead the women's force. When she arrived, Kent had two policewomen and the following year there were nearly 150.

Sillitoe went on to head MI5. His reputation was damaged by the 1951 defection to the Soviet Union of the spies Guy Burgess and Donald Maclean, and by the subsequent investigation afterwards, which showed that MI5 had been unaware and slow to act.

Sillitoe was made a Commander of the Order of the British Empire (CBE) in 1936 and knighted in the 1942 New Year Honours.

== Sources ==
- Sir Percy Sillitoe, Cloak Without Dagger, Cassell, 1955
- A. W. Cockerill, Sir Percy Sillitoe, W. H. Allen, 1975
- R. Deacon, The Greatest Treason: The Bizarre Story of Hollis, Liddell and Mountbatten, rev. edn, 1990
- "Obituary", The Times, 6 April 1962
- A. W. Cockerill, "Secrets & Skeletons – A Biography of Sir Percy Sillitoe", 15 June 2013

Government offices
Preceded by Sir David Petrie	Director General of MI5; 1946–1953	Succeeded by Sir Dick White
