= Glasgow effect =

Phenomenon of lower life expectancy and poor health in Glasgow, Scotland

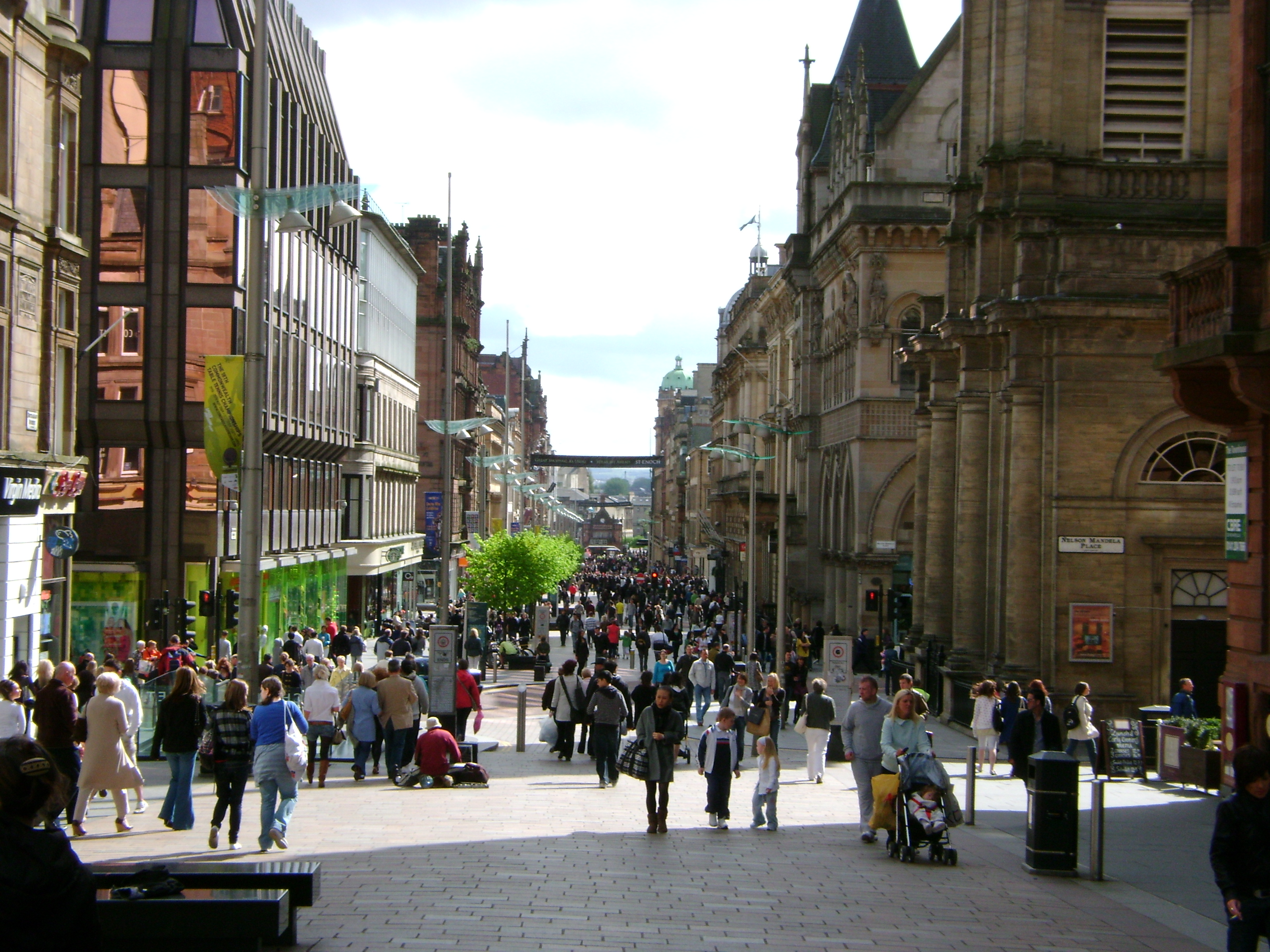
Buchanan Street, one of the main shopping areas in Glasgow city centre

The Glasgow effect is a socially constructed theory that describes the unexplained lower life expectancy of residents of Glasgow, specifically when compared to other municipalities across the United Kingdom. Although lower income levels are generally associated with poor health and a shorter lifespan, epidemiologists have argued that poverty alone does not appear to account for the disparity found in Glasgow. Equally deprived areas of the UK such as Liverpool and Manchester have higher life expectancies, and the wealthiest ten per cent of the Glasgow population have a lower life expectancy than the same group in other cities. One in four men in Glasgow will die before their sixty-fifth birthday.

There have been several hypotheses trying to explain the phenomenon, with no resolute consensus. Some allege that a “social apartheid” in the 60s and 70s is responsible, while others point to factors like vitamin D deficiency, cold winters, higher levels of poverty than the figures suggest, adverse childhood experiences and childhood stress, high levels of stress in general, and social alienation.

== Origins ==
The term is a derivative of the more general Scottish effect, which describes “the higher levels of poor health experienced in Scotland over and above that explained by socio-economic circumstances.” Discussions of a specific “Glasgow effect” first appear in the Journal Public Health as of September 2010, when researchers David Walsh, Neil Bendel, Russell Jones, and Phil Hanlon coined the term to account for the disproportionate presence of the Scottish Effect in Scotland’s Central-Western regions. One of the researchers who coined the term, David Walsh, later deplored in a 2016 article its use as a journalistic short-cut, thereby overlooking the political dimensions.

== Excess mortality and morbidity ==
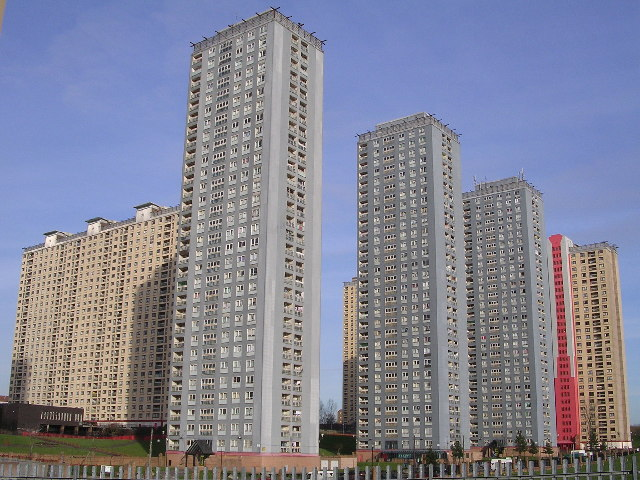
The Red Road Flats in Springburn were demolished in October 2015.

The city's mortality gap was not apparent until 1950 and seems to have widened since the 1970s. The Economist wrote in 2012: "It is as if a malign vapour rises from the Clyde at night and settles in the lungs of sleeping Glaswegians."

The mortality rates are the highest in the UK and among the highest in Europe. As of 2016, life expectancy in Scotland was lower for both females and males than anywhere else in western Europe, and was not improving as quickly as in other western European countries. With a population of 1.2 million in greater Glasgow, life expectancy at birth is 71.6 years for men, nearly seven years below the national average of 78.2 years, and 78 years for women, over four years below the national average of 82.3.

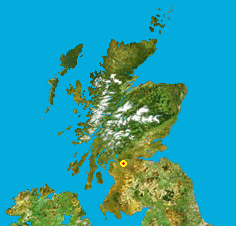
Glasgow within Scotland; also see Greater Glasgow.

According to the World Health Organization in 2008, the male life expectancy at birth in the Calton area of Glasgow between 1998–2002 was 54 years. (Note: This was based on "pooled data 1998-2002 (Hanlon, Walsh & Whyte, 2006)".) A local doctor attributed this to alcohol and drug abuse, and to a violent gang culture. According to Bruce Whyte of the Glasgow Centre for Population Health, writing in 2015, the estimate was based on deaths in 1998–2002 in an area comprising 2,500 people, and the figures may have been affected by the presence of hostels for adults with alcohol, drug and mental health problems. The 2008–2012 estimate for Calton and nearby Bridgeton together, by then more ethnically diverse and with fewer hostels, was 67.8 years for males and 76.6 years for females.

Research led by David Walsh of the Glasgow Centre for Population Health in 2010 concluded that the deprivation profiles of Glasgow, Liverpool and Manchester are almost identical, but premature deaths in Glasgow are over 30 per cent higher, and all deaths around 15 per cent higher, across almost the entire population. The higher mortality is fueled by stroke, respiratory disease, cardiovascular disease and cancer, along with deaths caused by alcohol, drugs, violence and suicide. According to a 2016 study, 43 per cent of adults are classified as either disabled or chronically ill. Suicide rates are higher than they were in 1968, and the all-cause mortality rate in the 15–44 age group is 142.4 deaths per 100,000. Drug-related deaths in Scotland more than doubled between 2006 and 2016.

== Cultural Representations ==
Since the early 20th century, the socio-economic disparity uniquely attributed to Glasgow has been an important theme within Scottish culture and art for representing working-class communities.

=== Fiction ===
Alexander Trocchi explores themes of substance abuse and masculinity in Glasgow in his 1954 novel Young Adam.

Douglas Stuart's Shuggie Bain (2020) portrays Glaswegian working-class life through the lens of a young boy. It combines themes of alcoholism and addiction with national pride and resilience, and has been described as 'an epic portrayal of a working-class family that is rarely seen in fiction' - let alone with a specifically Scottish, specifically Glaswegian setting. Shuggie Bain won the Booker Prize in 2020, and its judges hailed its success in giving a 'vivid glimpse of a marginalised, impoverished community in a bygone era of British history.'

Also by Stuart, Young Mungo (2022) portrays the same working-class Glaswegian life experience through the lens of two queer men in the early 1990s. The Wall Street Journal heralded 'the violence, religious tribalism, economic depression, diehard loyalties and fatalistic humour of the era, all expressed in the crooked poetry of Glaswegian dialect.

== Hypotheses ==
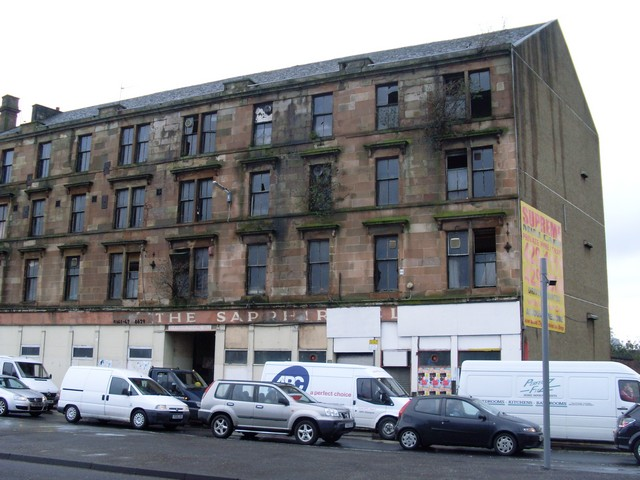
Derelict tenement housing, Paisley Road West, 2008, later demolished

The Glasgow Centre for Population Health (GCPH) was established in 2004 to study the causes of Glasgow's ill health; the centre's partners are NHS Greater Glasgow and Clyde, Glasgow City Council and the University of Glasgow. In a publication introducing the GCPH, the Chief Medical Officer for Scotland, Harry Burns, referred to research suggesting that chronically activated stress responses, especially in children, affect the structure of parts of the frontal lobes of the brain, and that these determine the physical reaction to stress, which could result in chronic ill health. The ability to attain good health, he suggested, depends in part on whether people feel in control of their lives, and whether they see their environments as threatening or supportive.

A GCPH report in 2016 concluded that certain historical processes and policy decisions had left the city more vulnerable to deprivation. Factors include the "lagged effects" of overcrowding and the former practice, in the 1960s and 1970s, of offering young, skilled workers social housing in new towns outside Glasgow; this, according to a 1971 government document, threatened to leave behind an "unbalanced population with a very high proportion of the old, the very poor and the almost unemployable".

Other hypotheses have included a higher prevalence of premature and low-birthweight births; land contaminated by toxins such as chromium; a high level of derelict land, leading to a "negative physical environment"; more deindustrialisation than in comparable cities; and low-quality housing estates. Social deficits and sources of social dysfunction have been suggested: religious sectarianism; a low "sense of coherence"; low social capital; lack of social mobility; and a culture of alienation and pessimism. Soft water (with lower levels of magnesium and calcium) has been mentioned as a possible factor, as have cold winters; vitamin D deficiency; higher levels of poverty than the figures suggest; and adverse childhood experiences.

Higher levels of binge drinking and smoking, as well as diets low in fruits and vegetables, have been proposed as possible causes for the Glasgow Effect. A study performed in 2010 by The Scottish Health Survey looked at adverse health behaviours in Glasgow versus the rest of Scotland. They conclude that with the exception of obesity and heavy smoking, there is no significant statistical difference in the occurrence of these behaviours between Glasgow and the rest of Scotland.

== Misuse ==
The researchers at the Glasgow Centre of Population Health (GCPH) who initially coined the phrase have since ceased use of the terms “Glasgow effect” and “Scottish effect.” In a 2016 article, one of these researchers, David Walsh, stated that the term was created as a placeholder for their initial observations of poor health in Scotland, and not as an attempt to propose an actual scientific theory. The GCPH no longer uses this term, and now only use the phrase “excess mortality”. Walsh elaborates further that the terms are functionally outdated, because this excess mortality is no longer unexplained, stating “now we have explained the most likely underlying causes of Glasgow’s and Scotland’s excess levels of mortality, there is no longer a place for, or a point to, expressions which were created to describe unexplained phenomena."

== See also ==
- Housing in Glasgow
- Poverty in the United Kingdom
- Salutogenesis

== Sources ==
- Walsh, David; McCartney, Gerry; Collins, Chik; Taulbut, Martin; Batty, G. David (May 2016). "History, politics and vulnerability: explaining excess mortality in Scotland and Glasgow". Public Health. 151. Glasgow Centre for Population Health: 209–210. doi:10.1016/j.puhe.2017.05.016. hdl:1834/13799. PMID 28697372.
