= Barrowland Ballroom =

Dance hall and music venue in Glasgow, Scotland

Coordinates: 55°51′18.6″N 4°14′12.1″W

- The Barras
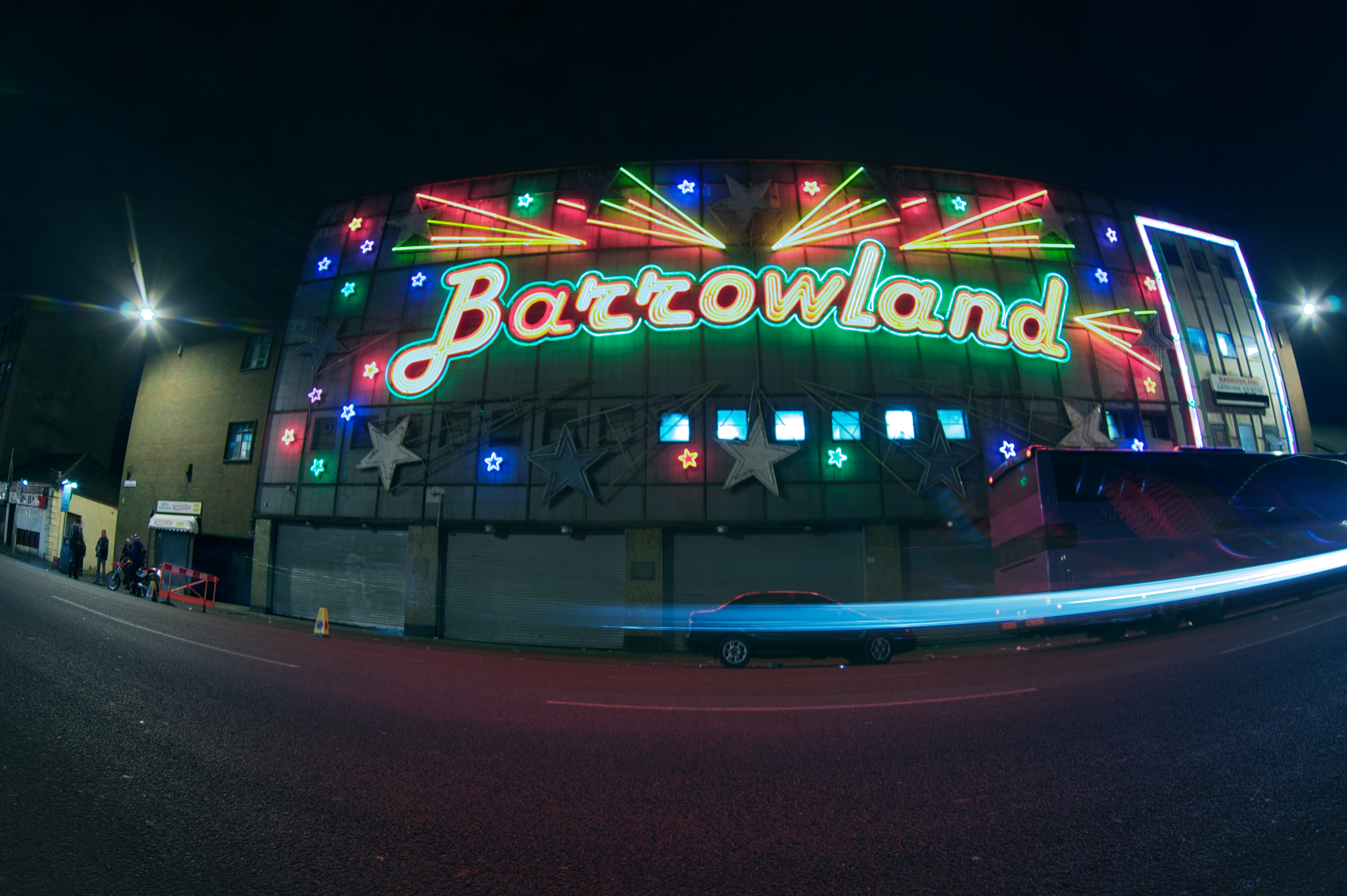
- Barrowland Ballroom in 2012
- Interactive map of Barrowland Ballroom
- Location: 244 Gallowgate, Glasgow, Scotland
- Capacity: 1,900
- Type: Entertainment venue, concert hall, ballroom
- Events: Rock, Pop, Indie, Dance, Folk, Irish

Construction
- Opened: 1934 (rebuilt 1960)

Website
- http://www.barrowland-ballroom.co.uk

The Barrowland Ballroom (also known as Barrowland and The Barras) is an entertainment venue, dance hall and music venue located in the Calton district in Glasgow, Scotland.

A prominent feature of the music scene in Glasgow, the venue has appeared in various elements of popular culture, notably tracks by Amy Macdonald, Simple Minds and Christy Moore.

== History ==
The original building opened in 1934 in a mercantile area east of Glasgow's city centre, built by Maggie McIver, the "Barras Queen". The area and the ballroom are named after the Glasgow Barrowland market.

The building was completely rebuilt after being largely destroyed by fire in 1958, and reopened on 24 December 1960. The Barrowland building includes large street-level halls used for the weekend markets, with a large weatherproof hall above. The front of the building is decorated with a large animated neon sign.

Since 2020, Barrowland Ballroom has been the venue for the annual Scottish Music Awards.

== Uses and rooms ==
From 1983 onwards the ballroom became a concert venue with a capacity of 1,900 standing, known for its acoustics and its sprung dance floor. Simple Minds relaunched the venue by filming the video for their 1983 single, "Waterfront", at Barrowlands. Adjacent to the ballroom itself is the Barrowland Park, where there is a path displaying the names of many artists who have played at the venue. Northern Irish punk band Stiff Little Fingers have played sold-out concerts at the venue every St Patrick's Day since 1992, and recorded their Best Served Loud album there in 2016 to celebrate 25 years at Barrowland.

The Barrowland 2 is part of the Barrowland Ballroom and is used both as a bar when larger shows are playing in the main hall and as a venue to host smaller gigs. While it occasionally plays host to smaller or acoustic gigs from more established acts, its usual function is as a venue for small local Glasgow bands. The promoters also host an event showcasing unsigned local acts in the main ballroom every year.

== Bible John ==
Between 1968 and 1969, three young women (Patricia Docker, Jemima MacDonald and Helen Puttock) were found brutally murdered after nights out at the Barrowland. All three murders were attributed to a man dubbed "Bible John" by police after he was heard referring to the Old Testament to one of his victims. Similarities between the murders led police to believe that they were the work of the same man. The man made contact with all three women at the Barrowland Ballroom, before escorting them home and raping and strangling them within yards of their doorsteps. All three women were menstruating and their handbags were stolen. An investigation failed to find Bible John, and the murders remain unsolved. On the night of the murder of Helen Puttock, Puttock's sister Jeannie Langford was with her and spoke to her sister's suspected killer. Jeannie described Bible John as: "25–35 years old, reddish/fair hair, wore a blue suit and matching trousers with white shirt. Spoke very politely and was very religious". In 2007, following the murder of Angelica Kluk, speculation arose that serial killer Peter Tobin was Bible John, due to similarities in modus operandi. Tobin frequented the Barrowland, and moved to Brighton in late 1968 before the last two murders were committed.

== Cultural impact ==
The Barrowland features heavily in the 2015 movie The Legend of Barney Thomson, directed by Robert Carlyle. It features in part of the opening scene of the 2014 movie God Help the Girl from writer/director Stuart Murdoch (lead singer of indie pop group Belle & Sebastian)

Scottish singer Amy Macdonald has a song about the ballroom, titled Barrowland Ballroom on her 2007 album This Is The Life. The edifice appears in a number of scenes in The Field of Blood (TV series), a British crime drama television series. The Barrowland is where young girls are picked up before being murdered in the novel The Quaker by Liam McIlvanney.

Simple Minds named a track after the venue on their 2018 studio album, Walk Between Worlds. Track 6 on the album was named "Barrowland Star" due to their close affinity with the venue. It features in "Fearful Lightning", an episode of the television series Taggart.

In April 2021, a mural inspired by Douglas Stuart's Booker Prize-winning novel Shuggie Bain was unveiled on the wall of the Barrowland Ballroom, featuring a boy dancing in the street, together with a quote from the book: "You'll not remember the city, you were too wee, but there's dancing. All kinds of dancing." The artwork and lettering was created by the Cobolt Collective – comprising Glasgow School of Art 2015 graduates Erin Bradley-Scott, Chelsea Frew and Kat Loudon – and is 20 by 20 metres (66 by 66 ft).
