= The Barras =

Street and market in Glasgow, Scotland

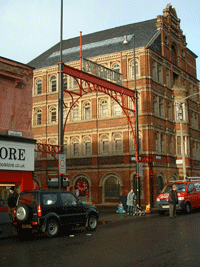
Moncur Street

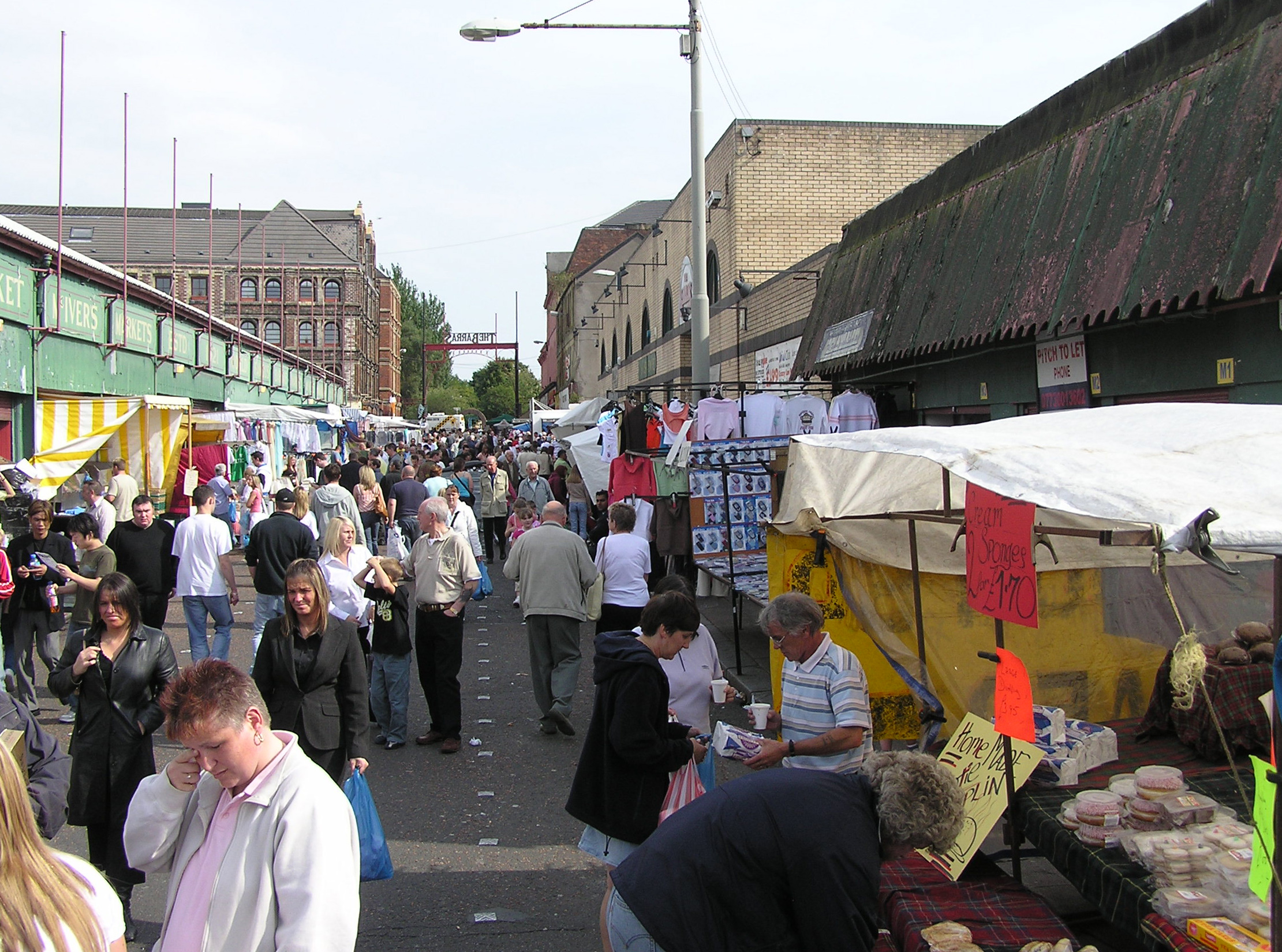
Moncur Street

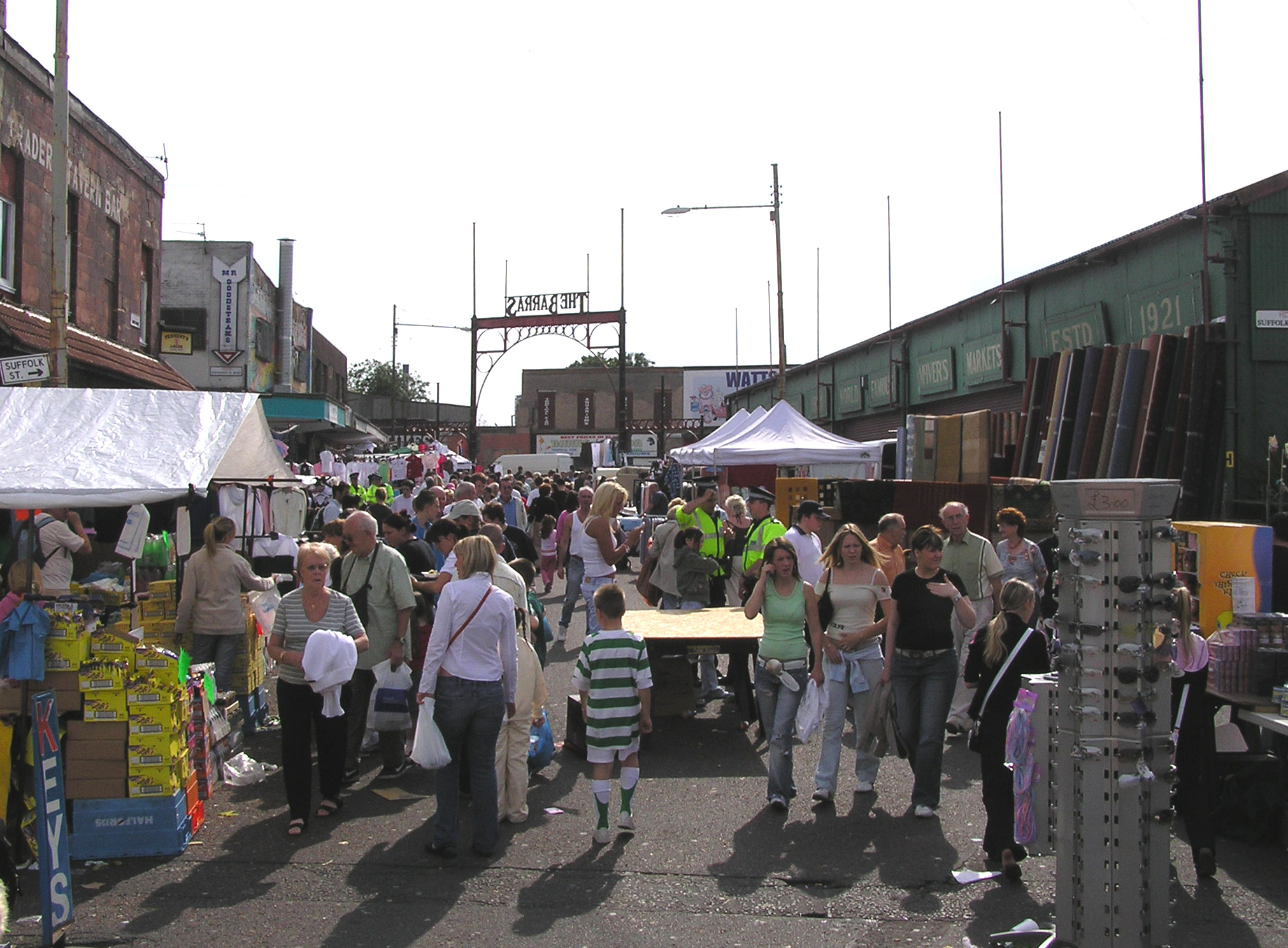
Kent Street

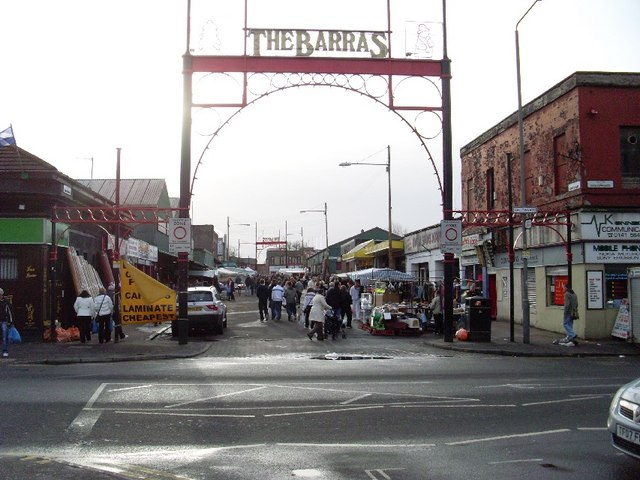
Kent Street

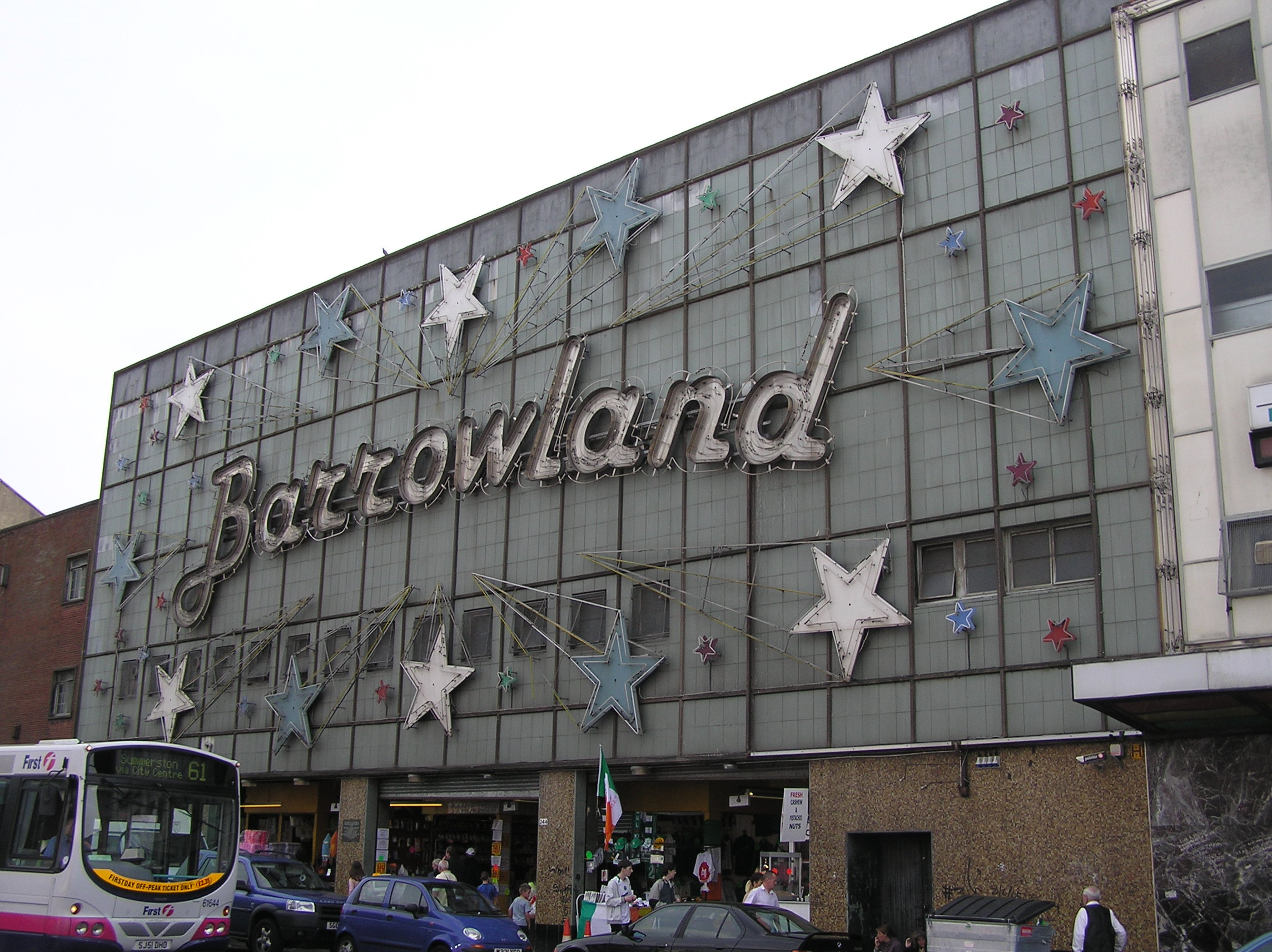
Barrowland Ballroom

The Barras is a major street and indoor weekend market in the East End of Glasgow, Scotland. The term "Barra" is Glaswegian dialect for "barrow" relating to the market's early years where traders sold their wares from handcarts.

Barrowland is sometimes used to describe the Calton district of Glasgow, where the market is located.

== History ==
One of Glasgow's most famous institutions, The Barras was founded by James and Maggie McIver in the interwar years. McIver hired over 300 barrows to local hawkers in her yard in Marshall Lane. This was in response to the Local Corporation wishing to stop local street traders and the street traders being charged by the police. In 1926, Maggie McIver decided to cover the market mainly to protect clothing hawkers from having their stock ruined. The market was fully enclosed two years later. Several of the smaller 1921-era market halls still bear the McIver name.

In 2016, with market stalls quieter than in previous decades, the city council looked at proposals to redevelop the area.

== Ballroom ==
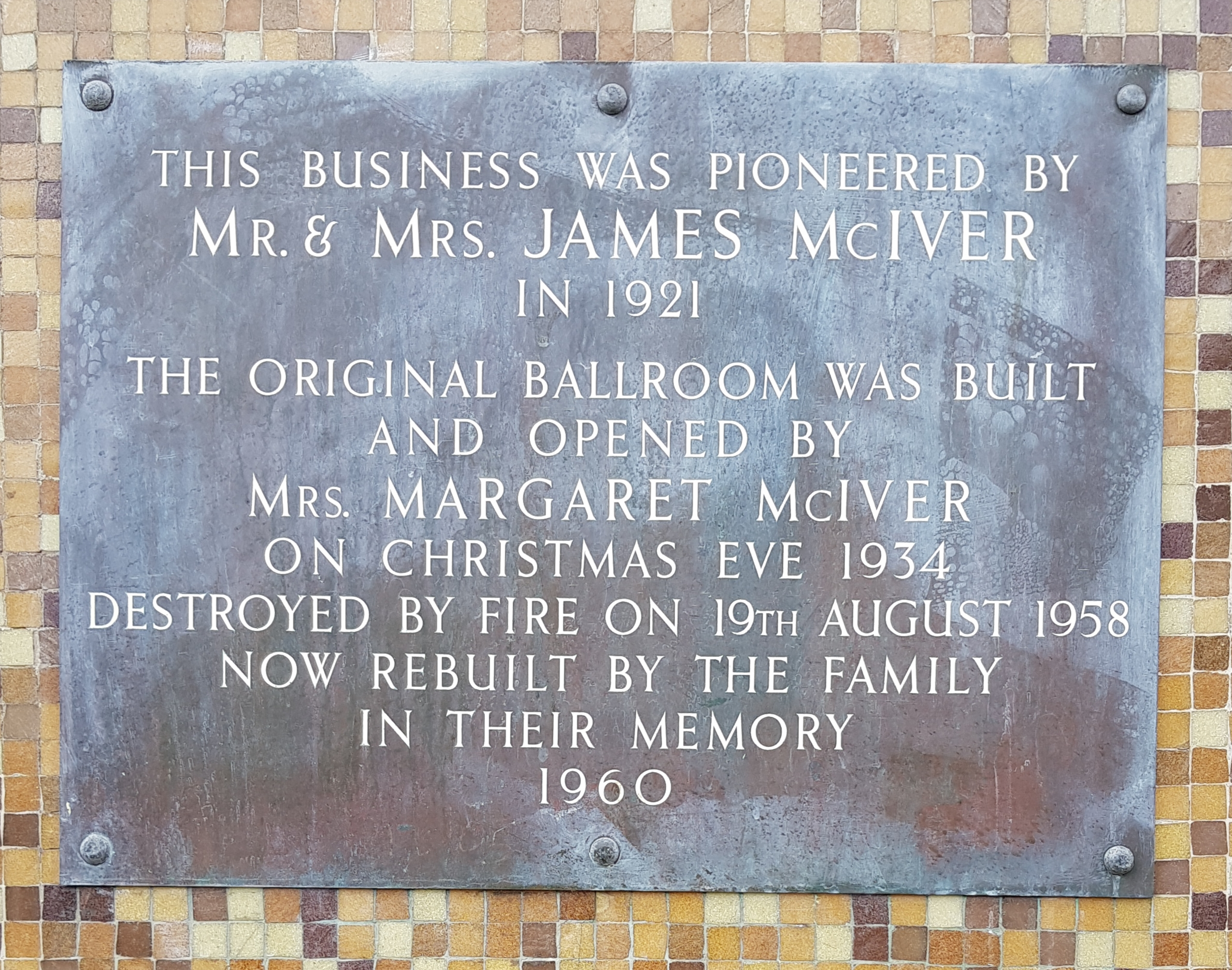
Plaque dedicated to Maggie and James McIver outside the Barrowland ballrooms

It was common practice for McIver to host a Christmas party for the hawkers and their families in a local hall. One year, when McIver was unable to hire the hall, she decided to build her own, the famous Barrowland Ballrooms which opened Christmas Eve 1934. The front of the building is decorated with a distinctive animated neon sign.

== Location ==
Because of its location on Gallowgate, the main thoroughfare from the city centre to Parkhead and Celtic Park, The Barrowland has a large concentration of public houses and shops devoted to fans of Celtic Football Club.
