= Barbara Denis de Vitré =

Police officer

Barbara Denis de Vitré OBE
- HMI Inspector Denis de Vitré
- Born: 6 November 1905; Hampstead Norreys, England
- Died: 8 August 1960 (aged 54); Westminster, London, England
- Education: University of Manchester
- Occupation: Police officer
- Known for: leading policewoman

Barbara Denis de Vitré OBE (6 November 1905 – 8 August 1960) was a British police officer who rose to be the highest ranking in Britain as women became accepted members of the British police.

== Life ==
De Vitré was born at Eling Farm, Hampstead Norreys, Berkshire in 1905, youngest daughter of George Theodosius Denis de Vitré (1861/2-1932), an estate manager, and Harriet Isabel (1866-1955), née Beeching. Her parents paid for her to attend a boarding school and she then moved on to the University of Manchester. Her career was chosen when she began a six-week course under Mary Allen's Women Auxiliary Service. Allen was a controversial figure as she had been a militant suffragette and she went on to be a leading fascist.

In 1928 she joined the police in Sheffield. This was helpful to her career as that constabulary had a more enthusiastic attitude to women in the force and she impressed the chief constable, Percy Sillitoe. In 1931 she was appointed to lead and train women policewomen in Cairo. She assisted with the laws pertaining to brothels, prostitutes and drug dealing and in training.

She returned to the UK in 1933 and became the lead policewoman in Leicester taking over from Eileen Claire Sloane. De Vitré was able to create an essential role dealing with cases of indecent assault and child protection. This was reinforced by the 1933 Children and Young Persons Act which required a policewoman to be present with any under-age or female person who was detained. However, she did not become a sergeant until 1933. The following year she was able to organise a national convention of policewomen which attracted half the country's policewomen from outside London. This was 36 women from 26 constabularies who gathered in Leicester.

In 1944 Sir Percy Sillitoe, who had been her boss in Sheffield, was made the Chief Constable of Kent and he employed de Vitré to lead the women's force. When she arrived she had two policewomen and the following year there were nearly 150.

The following year she was promoted into a national role in Her Majesty's Inspectorate. She became the most senior ranking woman police officer in Britain as she took a leading role in seeing a massive growth in the number of women serving within Britain's police.

De Vitré died in 1960 in Westminster of cancer.
