= Penny Mobs =

19th-century street gangs in Glasgow, Scotland

Penny Mobs was the term used by the press to describe the early street gangs active in Glasgow, Scotland during the early 1870s. As the court system offered heavy fines as an alternative to imprisonment, gang members were often freed after a collection from the gang at a "penny a head" thus earning its name.

The Penny Mobs, like their New York City counterparts, were among many gangs which formed following a large scale migration of Irish immigrants fleeing Ireland during the potato famines of the 1840s and 1850s. One of these gangs, the Ribbon Men, were reported to have blown up a gas holder in Tradeston in 1883.

Although the gangs declined after courts no longer offered fines for offenders, the smaller gangs eventually banded together for mutual protection which gave rise to the prominent gangs of the early 20th century such as The Tongs, the Billy Boys, the Norman Conks, The Tois, The Govans, the Powery Gang, the Soo-Siders, the Rednecks, the Baltic Fleet, the Black Diamond Gang, the Black Hands, the Nudes, the Ruchill Boys and the belters.
