= Patrick Carraher =

Scottish criminal

- Born: 1906; Glasgow, Scotland
- Died: 6 April 1946 (aged 39); HMP Barlinnie, Glasgow, Scotland
- Other name: The Fiend of the Gorbals
- Status: Executed by hanging
- Convictions: Murder; Manslaughter
- Penalty: Death

Patrick Carraher (1906 – 6 April 1946) was a notorious criminal from Glasgow.

Known as "the Fiend of the Gorbals", he was a well-known figure at the time of fights between rival Glasgow razor gangs. Despite being born into a respectable working-class family in the Gorbals area, Carraher loved to fight; he first spent time in a borstal at 14, the first of many imprisonments.

Carraher was arrested on 13 August 1934 for stabbing to death James Shaw, a soldier. At his trial, he pleaded that he did not understand what he was doing because he was drunk. Carraher was convicted of manslaughter and sentenced to three years in prison. The jury's verdict surprised many people in the legal establishment, and was seen as a sign of reluctance by juries to send someone to the gallows.

Carraher relished the experience of prison, as lifestyles there were tough and often involved prisoners being subject to knife crime, this being one of his specialities. For the majority of the inmates at the time, the objective was to claim bigger and better objects by stealing, but for Carraher his main objective remained fighting, the case from a very young age. His actions were often influenced by alcohol, as he had developed a serious addiction to it which constantly fuelled his anger and inspiration for malicious acts.

Even after his release, he continued his murderous and gruesome acts and was charged again with razor slashing and assault. His final act of terror was on 23 November 1945, when he murdered another young soldier, John Gordon, during a drunken altercation. One of Carraher's few friends, Daniel Bonnar, the brother of Carraher's girlfriend at the time, had a dispute with one of the Gordons. When Carraher learned this, he went on the hunt for the Gordons, looking to settle the long lasting feud. He found John Gordon with his brother-in-law, and launched a sharp chisel into the soldier's neck. He was arrested and at his trial, Daniel Bonnar and his girlfriend provided evidence against him, and the jury found him guilty within twenty minutes and convicted him of murder.

He was hanged at HM Prison Barlinnie by Thomas Pierrepoint.
