= Billy Boys =

Loyalist song associated with Rangers F.C.

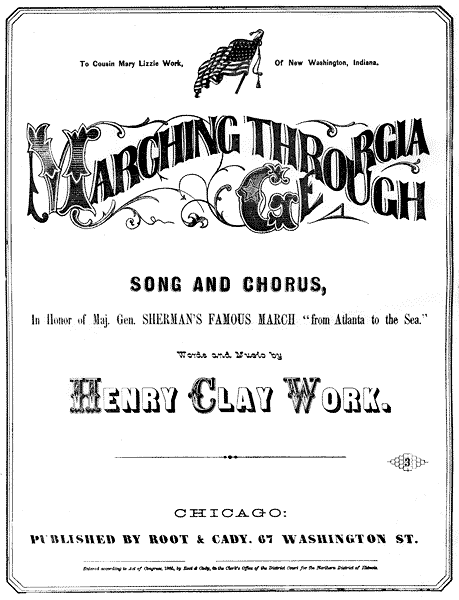
Billy Boys is set to the music to Marching Through Georgia

"Billy Boys", also titled "The Billy Boys", is a loyalist song from Glasgow, sung to the tune of "Marching Through Georgia". It originated in the 1920s as the signature song of one of the Glasgow razor gangs led by Billy Fullerton and later became viewed as reflecting the long-running sectarian religious hatred between Protestants and Catholics in the city.

== Origins ==
Billy Boys originated in the 1920s as the signature tune of the Billy Boys, who were a Protestant Glasgow razor gang in Bridgeton (an area of Glasgow historically associated with the city's Protestant population, and with Scottish unionism – Brigton is the Scots form of Bridgeton) led by Billy Fullerton. The gang was named after King William of Orange, popularly known as "King Billy". The gang often clashed with Roman Catholic gangs such as the Norman Conks and the Calton Tongs. Fullerton was a member of the British Fascists; he was awarded a medal for strike-breaking during the 1926 General Strike and formed a Glasgow branch of the British Union of Fascists with the onset of World War II. The Billy Boys song was often sung loudly when the gang performed it. They regularly sang it when they marched through primarily Catholic areas of Glasgow on Catholic holy days. This often led to the Billy Boys being attacked by members of the Norman Conks as a result. Despite being primarily based in Glasgow, in the 1930s the Billy Boys were invited to march in Belfast and sang Billy Boys while they were there as part of The Twelfth celebrations.

The Brigton Billy Boys and their youth wing, the Derry Boys, started to attend association football matches in the late 1920s and early 1930s. During this time, they attended Rangers matches and Rangers fans started to sing the Billy Boys song as part of a perceived affiliation with the Billy Boys.

Despite Percy Sillitoe, the Chief Constable of Glasgow, eradicating the Glasgow razor gangs and most young Protestants joining the Orange Order instead of the remaining gangs, Rangers fans continued to sing the Billy Boys in tribute to Fullerton as he still retained a prominent position among Glasgow Protestants even after the gangs had disbanded. The Orange Order then adopted the "Billy Boys" song and changed the lyrics to be played on Orange walks, with the references to Billy being altered to refer to King William II of Scotland and III of England and Ireland.

== Football song ==
=== Rangers ===
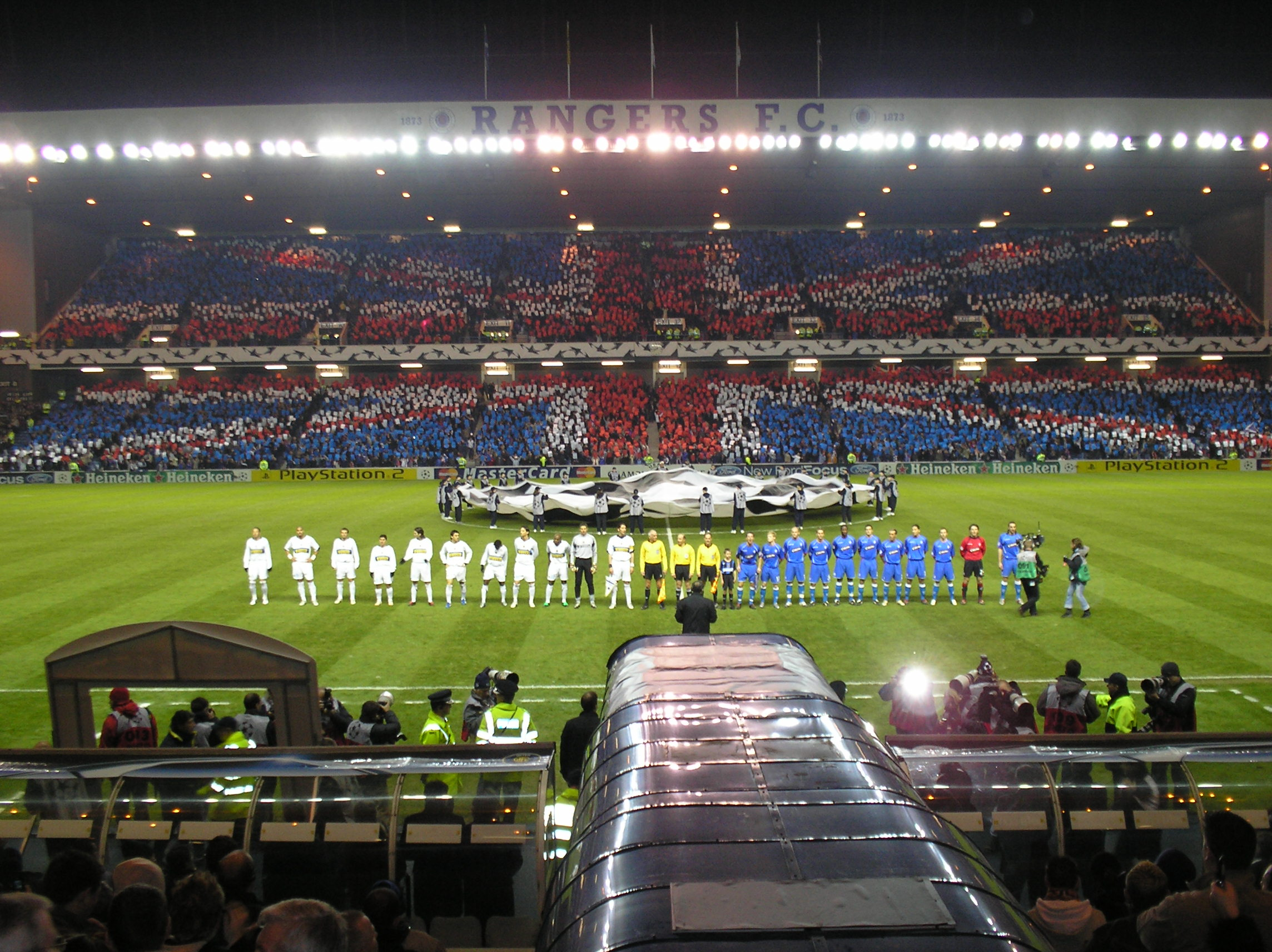
Rangers F.C. supporters adopted "Billy Boys" as part of a perceived affiliation with the Brigton Boys

Even after Fullerton's death, Rangers fans continued to sing "Billy Boys" to commemorate Fullerton and the Brigton Boys. In later years, attempts were made to portray the song as being against Irish republicanism rather than Catholics. In 1999, the Scotland national football team manager Craig Brown was filmed singing "Billy Boys" (as part of a joking exchange with his Catholic girlfriend) and faced calls to step down from his position in charge of the Scotland national football team. However, the Scottish Football Association (SFA) gave him their backing.

The song was at the centre of a controversy surrounding "ninety-minute bigots", an expression allegedly coined by former Rangers chairman Sir David Murray: "Ninety-minute Bigots do not hold beliefs but nonetheless sing songs at football matches which are sectarian, simply to join in with the rest of the crowd." Rangers have adopted several measures to tackle this behaviour including attempts to bring older Rangers songs back into popular use, with Murray speaking out against the singing of the "Billy Boys" on many occasions. In 2006, Rangers were charged by UEFA for discriminatory chanting over the singing of "Billy Boys" during a UEFA Champions League game against Villarreal. Rangers were found not guilty due to "Billy Boys" having been sung for years without the SFA or the Scottish government intervening against it and ruled that it was tolerated as a social and historic song. However, after an appeal where they were warned, Rangers were ordered by UEFA to make a public announcement at all home games, prohibiting the singing of the song despite UEFA admitting they were unable to do anything about it because it was a Scottish social issue.

In 2011, "Billy Boys" was included in a list of chants that had been banned from Scottish football grounds as part of new legislation from the Scottish government. It was specifically banned because of its "Up to our knees in Fenian blood" line. It was banned because it was decided by the Scottish government that "Fenian" in the context of the song meant Roman Catholics and was thus sectarian.

Despite the ban, "Billy Boys" has still been sung at Rangers matches, including their match against Queen's Park at Hampden Park in 2012. Other Scottish football clubs, among them Heart of Midlothian, Kilmarnock, and Dundee, use versions of "Billy Boys" adapted to support their own clubs.

=== Northern Ireland ===
The Billy Boys song has also been used in Northern Ireland, which may have arisen as a result of the Brigton Boys' march in Belfast. It is often used by supporters of Belfast club Linfield due to historic links with Rangers as "Blues Brothers".

The song was sung in 2013 by supporters of the Northern Ireland national football team during their match against Luxembourg at Stade Josy Barthel in protest against the Northern Ireland team anthem, God Save the Queen, not being played at the Irish Cup final. In April 2014, the Irish Football Association (IFA) introduced punishments for "any ... song or chant that is undeniably sectarian or offensive". Linfield advised their supporters that this included all variations of Billy Boys, including the Marching Through Georgia tune. The IFA based their decision on the precedent from the UEFA decision regarding Billy Boys and Rangers in 2006. There was doubt expressed by fans as to how the IFA would enforce the ban on the Marching Through Georgia tune if it was used in a song other than Billy Boys.

== Lyrics ==
Hello, Hello
We are the Billy Boys
Hello, Hello
You'll know us by our noise
We're up to our knees in Fenian blood
Surrender or you'll die
For we are
The Brigton Billy Boys

The 'Derry Boys' were a smaller, youth faction of the Billy Boys, and the original version used the term Brigton Billy Boys in its place.

== Legacy ==
The Billy Boys song appears in season 5 of the BBC TV series Peaky Blinders. It is sung by a fictional version of the Brigton Boys, sharing the same name as the song, who clash with the main protagonist Tommy Shelby and his organisation as one of the rival gangs. An antagonist and leader of the Billy Boys in the show is known as Jimmy McCavern.
