= Small Faces (film) =

1995 British film by Gillies MacKinnon

- Theatrical release poster
- Directed by: Gillies MacKinnon
- Written by: Billy MacKinnon; Gillies MacKinnon
- Starring: Clare Higgins; Ian McElhinney; Iain Robertson
- Cinematography: John de Borman
- Edited by: Scott Thomas
- Music by: John Keane
- Production company: BBC Films
- Distributed by: Guild Film Distribution
- Release dates: 1995 (Edinburgh Film Festival); 5 April 1996 (United Kingdom)
- Running time: 108 minutes
- Country: United Kingdom
- Language: English

Small Faces is a 1996 Scottish drama film directed by Gillies MacKinnon about gangs, specifically the Tongs, in 1960s Glasgow. It stars Iain Robertson, Joseph McFadden, Steven Duffy, Kevin McKidd, Laura Fraser, Mark McConnochie, Scott Anderson, Clare Higgins, Garry Sweeney, Colin McCredie and Alastair Galbraith.

== Plot ==
Three teenage brothers – gang member Bobby, artistically minded Alan and 13-year-old Lex – are growing up with their mother on Glasgow's South Side in 1968. Events which will have consequences for all concerned start to get out of control when Lex accidentally shoots Malky, the leader of the Garaside Tongs street gang, with an air gun.

== Cast ==
- Iain Robertson as Lex Maclean
- Joe McFadden as Alan Maclean (Credited as Joseph McFadden)
- Steven Duffy as Bobby Maclean
- Laura Fraser as Joanne Macgowan
- Garry Sweeney as Charlie Sloan
- Claire Higgins as Lorna Maclean
- Kevin McKidd as Malky Johnson
- Scott Anderson as Jamie
- Mark McConnochie as Gorbals
- Steven Singleton as Welch
- David Walker as Fabio
- Ian McElhinney as Uncle Andrew
- Paul Doonan as Jake
- Colin Semple as Dowd
- Colin McCredie as Doug
- Debbie Welsh as Rebecca

== Production ==
The film was produced in 1995 by Skyline Productions in association with the BBC Film Fund.

The film was shot on location at various districts in Glasgow, including Darnley, Sighthill, Partick, Merrylee, Mount Florida and Bishopbriggs and in Edinburgh. Scenes were also shot at the Glasgow School of Art.

The song "In The Year 2525" by Zager and Evans is used as music over the closing credits.

== Release ==
The film won 'Best British Film' at the Edinburgh Film Festival. It was released on 19 screens in the UK on 5 April 1996 and grossed £52,590 in its opening weekend.

== See also ==
- Glasgow gangs
- BFI Top 100 British films
- List of hood films
