= Gillies MacKinnon =

Scottish screenwriter and film director (born 1948)

Gillies MacKinnon (born 8 January 1948) is a Scottish film director, writer and painter. He was born in Glasgow and attended the Glasgow School of Art where he studied mural painting. Following this he became an art teacher and cartoonist, and about this time he travelled with a nomadic tribe in the Sahara for six months.

In the 1970s he studied at the Middlesex Polytechnic (now Middlesex University) and in the 1980s in the National Film and Television School. He made a short film called Passing Glory as his graduation piece, a recreation of Glasgow in the 1950s and 1960s. It was premiered at the 1986 Edinburgh International Film Festival, where it won the first Scottish Film Prize.

== Filmography ==
- Conquest of the South Pole (1989) (TV film, adapted from the play by Manfred Karge)
- The Grass Arena (1991)
- The Playboys (1992)
- The Young Indiana Jones Chronicles (1992) (TV series)
- A Simple Twist of Fate (1994)
- Small Faces (1996) co-writer and director
- Trojan Eddie (1996)
- Regeneration (1997)
- Hideous Kinky (1998)
- The Last of the Blonde Bombshells (2000)
- The Escapist (2002)
- Pure (2002)
- Gunpowder, Treason & Plot (2004)
- Tara Road (2005)
- Castles in the Sky (2014)
- Whisky Galore! (2016)
- Torvill & Dean (2018) (TV film)
- The Last Bus (2021)
