= No Mean City =

1935 novel by H. Kingsley Long

- 1967 Neville Spearman edition
- Author: H. Kingsley Long
- Language: English
- Publication date: 1935

No Mean City is a 1935 novel by H. Kingsley Long, a journalist, and Alexander McArthur, an unemployed worker. It is an account of life in the Gorbals, a run-down slum district of Glasgow (now mostly demolished, but re-built in a contemporary style) with the hard men and the razor gangs.

Whatever its literary or other merits, for many years it was regarded as the definitive account of life in Glasgow, and its title became a byword. It originated from a set of conversations sent to Longman's publishing firm from McArthur which was then sent to Kingsley Long to build into a complete novel.

Its title is a quotation from the Bible, where Paul the Apostle says that he is a citizen of "no mean city", (no obscure or insignificant city) i.e. he was a Roman citizen, even though he was a Jew from Tarsus.

This tale of Glasgow gang lands is set in the inter-war period (1920s) and is a depiction of working class life for young and old, male and female and gives insight into both the private and public issues faced by the dwellers of the city.

The title is also the name of a song written by Mike Moran and sung by Maggie Bell used as the theme music for the STV detective drama series Taggart.
