= Violet Kray =

Mother of The Kray Twins (1909–1982)

- Born: Violet Annie Parsons; 5 August 1909; Hoxton, London, England
- Died: 4 August 1982 (aged 72); Hoxton, London, England
- Resting place: Chingford Mount Cemetery, London
- Occupation: Homemaker
- Spouse: Charles David Kray (m. 1930)
- Children: Charlie Kray; Reggie Kray; Ronnie Kray
- Relatives: Frances Shea (daughter-in-law); Gary Kray (grandson)

Violet Annie Kray (née Parsons; 5 August 1909 – 4 August 1982) was a British matriarch best known as the mother of the notorious East End gangsters the Kray twins, Ronnie and Reggie. A central and stabilising figure within the family, she maintained a home at 178 Vallance Road in Bethnal Green that served as a sanctuary for her sons throughout their criminal careers. Despite the twins' reputation for extreme violence and organised crime, Violet remained fiercely loyal and protective of them, often cited by biographers as the only person who held significant influence over their behaviour. Her death in 1982 was marked by a high-profile funeral that saw her incarcerated sons permitted to attend under heavy police escort, highlighting her enduring status within London's East End folklore.

== Early life ==
Violet Annie Parsons was born on 5 August 1909 in Hoxton, London. She was the daughter of James Parsons, a well-known local figure and street trader, and Mary Parsons. Raised in the working-class districts of the East End, she grew up in an environment where family loyalty and community ties were paramount.

== Family and domestic life ==
In 1930, Violet married Charles David "Charlie" Kray, a dealer in second-hand clothing and jewellery. In 1933, the couple moved to 178 Vallance Road in Bethnal Green, a terraced house that would become the longterm base for the family.

Violet and her husband had three children: Charles Jr. (1927–2000), and twins Ronald and Reginald (1933–1995 and 1933–2000). In 1933, the family moved to 178 Vallance Road in Bethnal Green, a terraced house that became the central hub of the family's life for several decades. Throughout her marriage, Violet was the primary stable figure in the household. Her husband, Charlie Sr., was often absent, spending years as a fugitive from conscription during World War II and working as a travelling dealer. As a result, Violet maintained a strictly traditional domestic environment. She became the sole home authority and emotional anchor for her children, fostering an intensely close bond with her sons.

She was renowned in the East End for her hospitality, famously providing tea and meals for the various visitors ranging from local neighbours to high-profile associates of her sons who frequented the house. Despite her sons' criminal activities, Violet insisted on a strict code of conduct within the home; the twins famously forbade any swearing or discussion of their "business" in her presence, preserving the house as a sanctuary.

== Later life ==
Following the arrest of her sons in 1968, and their subsequent conviction for murder in 1969, Violet's life was primarily dedicated to supporting them during their incarceration. Despite the twins being held in high-security facilities, she remained a constant presence in their lives, making regular journeys to visit Parkhurst Prison on the Isle of Wight and Broadmoor Hospital. Throughout the 1970s, she served as the twins' main link to the outside world and the East End community. She continued to live in her Vallance Road home for several years, before eventually moving to a flat in Hoxton. Violet remained fiercely protective of her sons' reputation, often granting interviews where she defended their character and maintained that they were "good boys" who had been targeted by the authorities. During this period, she also focused on her eldest son, Charlie, and her grandchildren, while her home remained a site of pilgrimage for those loyal to the Kray family.

== Death and funeral ==
Violet Kray died of cancer on 4 August 1982 at a nursing home in Hoxton, a day before her 73rd birthday. She was survived by her husband, who died the following year. Her death prompted a massive outpouring of grief in the East End, where she was regarded as a matriarchal figure of the old community. Her funeral was held on 11 August 1982 at St Matthew's Church, Bethnal Green. The event became one of the most high-profile funerals in London's history, with an estimated 60,000 people lining the mile-long route from the undertakers to the church. In a highly controversial decision, the Home Office granted Ronnie and Reggie Kray compassionate leave to attend the service. The twins were transported from Parkhurst and Broadmoor Hospital, and were escorted into the church in handcuffs, flanked by a heavy contingent of police and prison officers. The service was attended by several notable figures of the era, including actress Diana Dors. Violet was buried in the family plot at Chingford Mount Cemetery. The image of the twins following their mother's floral-laden hearse under armed guard remains a defining cultural image of the Kray era.

== Burial ==
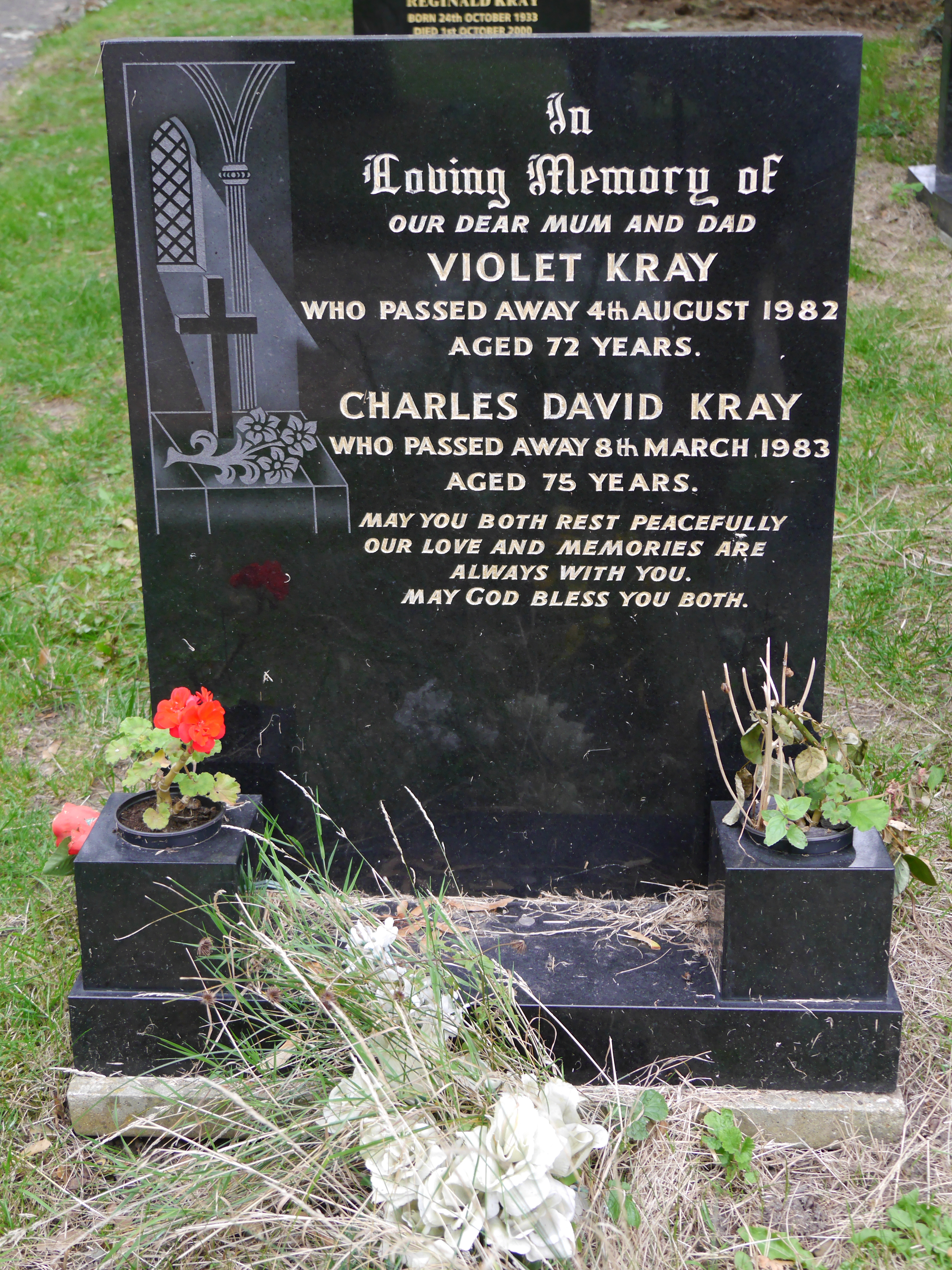

Violet Kray was buried on 11 August 1982 in a private family plot at Chingford Mount Cemetery in East London. The plot has since become a focal point for researchers of the Kray family history, as it serves as the final resting place for several key members of the Kray family. Violet is interred alongside her husband and their three sons. The plot also contains the remains of her grandson, Gary Kray (who died in 1996), and Reggie Kray's first wife, Frances Shea (who died in 1967).

The headstone is a traditional black granite memorial that lists the family members in order of their passing, often adorned with floral tributes from members of the public and former associates of the Kray firm.

== In popular culture ==
Violet Kray has been a central figure in numerous cinematic and literary portrayals of the Kray twins, often depicted as the primary emotional influence on her sons and the matriarchal heart of the "Firm". Notable portrayals include:

- Billie Whitelaw in the 1990 film The Krays. Whitelaw's performance was highly acclaimed for capturing Violet's intense devotion and domestic authority.
- Jane Wood in the 2015 biopic Legend, starring Tom Hardy. In this version, Violet is depicted as a stabilising force who largely ignores the violent nature of her sons' criminal empire.
- Nicola Stapleton in the films The Rise of the Krays (2015) and The Fall of the Krays (2016). Stapleton's portrayal focused on the earlier years of the family and the domestic life at Vallance Road.

Violet is also a recurring character in British true crime literature and was a significant figure in the 2015 documentary The Krays: The Prison Years, which explored her role as the twins' primary connection to the outside world during their long incarceration.
