= My Story (Kray book) =

1993 book by Ronnie Kray

- Author: Ronnie Kray ( with Fred Dinenage)
- Language: English
- Genre: autobiography
- Publisher: Sidgwick & Jackson (hardback) Pan Books (paperback)
- Publication date: 10 September 1993
- Media type: Print (Hardback) (Paperback)
- Pages: 192
- ISBN: 0-330-33507-3
- OCLC: 31935233

My Story is an autobiographical book written by Ronnie Kray. He, along with his twin brother Reggie, were said to be some of the most feared gangsters in British history.

Originally published in hardback 1993 by Sidgwick & Jackson, it was re-published in paperback on 7 October 1994 by Pan Books part of Macmillan Publishers.

== Synopsis ==
This book is the follow-up to the jointly written Our Story (1988) by both Ronnie and Reggie Kray.

In My Story, Ronnie describes in his own words the murders of Jack "the Hat" McVitie and George Cornell, his bisexuality, and his feelings about spending 11 years in Parkhurst followed by his later years in Broadmoor Hospital for the criminally insane. Also included is a chapter written by Ronnie's wife, Kate Kray, and 21 photographs depicting the young Krays, their family, friends, and victims.

Kray writes in the book that the 1960s "were the best years of our lives", and that "The Beatles and The Rolling Stones were the rulers of pop music, Carnaby Street ruled the fashion world... and me and my brother ruled London. We were fucking untouchable."
