= Born Fighter =

- Author: Reginald Kray
- Language: English
- Genre: autobiography
- Publisher: Century
- Publication date: 1990
- Media type: Print (Hardback) (Paperback)
- Pages: 182
- ISBN: 0-09-987810-0
- OCLC: 26543596

Born Fighter is an autobiographical book written by Reginald Kray. In 1969 he and his twin brother Ronnie Kray received life sentences for the murders of George Cornell and Jack McVitie. It was first published in London in 1990 in hardback by Century and paperback in 1991 by subsidiary Arrow Books.

Reggie Kray wrote several successful books while incarcerated in high security prison as a Category A prisoner for 30 years (of those, 18 years were in Parkhurst Prison). The book gives a first-hand account of Reggie's life as one half of the most notorious underworld gangsters in the 1950s and 1960.
