= Charlie Kray =

British amateur boxer and criminal (1927–2000)

- Born: Charles James Kray; 9 July 1927; Hoxton, London, England
- Died: 4 April 2000 (aged 72); Newport, Isle of Wight, England
- Occupation: Professional boxer
- Organisation: The Firm
- Spouse: Doris Moore (m. 1948; sep. 1975)
- Children: 2
- Relatives: Ronnie and Reggie Kray (younger brothers)
- Criminal charge: Drug trafficking
- Penalty: 12 years

Charles James Kray (9 July 1927 – 4 April 2000) was an English professional boxer and convicted criminal. He was the elder brother of Ronnie and Reggie Kray.

== Early life ==
Charles James Kray was born at 26 Gorsuch Street, Hoxton on 9 July 1927, to Charles David Kray (1907–1983), a wardrobe dealer, and Violet Annie Lee (1909–1982). His father was of Irish descent and his mother was Romani. When Kray was six, his mother had identical twins, Ronnie and Reggie Kray, with Reggie born 10 minutes before Ronnie. His sister, Violet (born in 1929), died in infancy.

In 1932, the family moved to Stean Street, near Kingsland Road, Hackney. The family later moved to 178 Vallance Road in Bethnal Green.

Kray attended Laburnum Street School in Haggerston, where he was selected for the football team.

Before the war, Kray worked for Lloyd's of London as a messenger boy in the city, earning around 18 shillings a week.

== Boxing career ==
Young Charlie was brought up on stories about fighting and boxing, and often dreamt of winning the Lonsdale Belt as Champion of the World.

In 1943, Kray represented the Royal Navy as a welterweight against the Army and the Air Force.

Kray soon took up boxing again and trained in the local gyms. His grandfather set up a punch bag in an upstairs room in Vallance Road.

After a spell of rheumatic fever, Kray joined the Naval Cadets, where he continued training seriously. He later joined the Navy where he boxed as a welterweight. However, he started to get terrible headaches and was soon discharged unfit from the Navy, on medical grounds, due to chronic migraines.

In his early twenties, Kray started to box professionally, winning a number of fights. He lost the last professional fight he fought.

== Criminal history ==
Although he did not have the violent reputation of his younger brothers, Kray was still an important component of the family's gangland history.

When the twins' empire came crashing down following their arrests in 1969, Charlie was inevitably dragged down with them. Kray was given a 10-year sentence for being an accessory to the murder of George Cornell. He was released from prison in 1975, and went on to make money from promoting the family's legend, such as being paid £100,000 to act as a "consultant" on the 1990 film The Krays.

In 1997, Kray was given a 12-year sentence for attempting to smuggle cocaine valued at £39m into England. Three years into his sentence, Kray's health started to deteriorate.

== Krayleigh Enterprises ==
In 1985, officials at Broadmoor Hospital discovered a business card of Ronnie's that led to evidence that the twins, from separate institutions, were operating Krayleigh Enterprises (a "lucrative bodyguard and 'protection' business for Hollywood stars") together with their older brother Charlie Kray and an accomplice at large. Among their clients was Frank Sinatra, who hired 18 bodyguards from Krayleigh Enterprises on his visit to the 1985 Wimbledon Championships. Documents released under Freedom of Information laws revealed that although officials were concerned about this operation, they believed that there was no legal basis to shut it down.

== Personal life ==
Kray married Doris "Dolly" Moore on Christmas Day 1948. They had two children, Gary Kray (1951-1995) and Nancy. In an argument, Moore had said that Nancy was not Kray's daughter, but then denied it. Gary died from lung cancer on 8 March 1995.

Kray later discovered Moore had been having an affair with George Ince, but stayed with her for the sake of his family. She continued to see Ince behind Kray's back. The couple separated in 1975.

During the 1950s, Kray had a six-month affair with Barbara Windsor, star of the Carry On films and EastEnders. It has been suggested that the affair did not last long because his children and their happiness came first, and staying with Moore provided them with a stable background.

Kray had been a confidant of Jackie Collins, Judy Garland, Sonny Liston and Christine Keeler.

Kray said he found life difficult and claimed he was "unemployable" because of his surname.

On the evening of 4 April 2000 Kray died from heart complications at St Mary's Hospital on the Isle of Wight. He was 72. He had been suffering from a heart condition prior to his death. Kray died in the presence of his girlfriend, Diane Buffini, and two other friends. Kray's surviving brother Reggie was released from prison to attend the funeral and himself died only six months later.

Kray's funeral was held at St Matthew's Church, Bethnal Green, on 19 April 2000 and he is buried at Chingford Mount Cemetery.

== Published works ==
- Me and My Brothers, with Robin McGibbon. Everest Books, 14 October 1976.
- Doing the Business, with Colin Fry. John Blake Publishing Ltd, April 1993.
