= The Krays: Dead Man Walking =

2018 British crime drama film

- Poster
- Directed by: Richard John Taylor
- Written by: Richard John Taylor
- Produced by: Jonathan Sothcott
- Starring: Rita Simons; Josh Myers; Christopher Ellison; Guy Henry
- Cinematography: Ali Farahani
- Production company: Hereford Films
- Release date: 10 September 2018
- Running time: 87 minutes
- Country: United Kingdom
- Language: English

The Krays: Dead Man Walking is a British crime drama film written and directed by Richard John Taylor and starring Rita Simons, Josh Myers, Christopher Ellison and Guy Henry. It was released on 10 September 2018.

== Cast ==
- Rita Simons as Lisa Prescott
- Josh Myers as Frank Mitchell
- Christopher Ellison as Albert Donoghue
- Guy Henry as Lord Boothby
- Nicholas Ball as Harry Webster
- Jeanine Nerissa Sothcott as Valerie Fiske
- Leslie Grantham as Nipper Read
- Marc Pickering as Reggie Kray
- Nathanjohn Carter as Ronnie Kray
- Triana Terry as Frances Kray
- Charlie Woodward as Teddy Smith
- Darren Day as Don Dunn
- Linda Lusardi as Sally Mitchell
- Steve Wraith as Hartnell Harris
- Lowri Watts-Joyce as Mavis Mortimer
- Lacey Bond as Petula Watts

== Release ==
The film was released on 10 September 2018 by Sony Pictures and was the biggest first week on DVD of any non-theatrical British film that year.

== Reception ==
On: Yorkshire Magazine said, "The movie doesn’t outstay its welcome, and while it obviously won’t be for all tastes, if you like Brit indie gangster flicks with a mean streak, this certainly passes the time, even if it does feel like a feature-length teaser for something bigger."

== Sequel ==
Due to the success of the film, writer and director Richard John Taylor announced a sequel, entitled The Krays: New Blood that would see Marc Pickering and Nathanjohn Carter, Nicholas Ball, Josh Myers and Triana Terry reprise their roles and that it would focus on the death of Reggie’s wife Frances Kray, and the possibility that Ronnie may have played a role in her death. It was set to be released in 2021, although this may have been pushed back due to the coronavirus pandemic.
