= James Martin Child =

British World War I flying ace

- Born: 20 October 1893; Leytonstone, North London, England
- Died: 23 August 1918 (aged 24); Turnberry, Scotland
- Burial place: Chingford Mount Cemetery, London, England
- Military career
- Allegiance: British Empire
- Branch: Aviation
- Rank: Captain
- Units: No. 4 Squadron RFC; No. 19 Squadron RFC; No. 84 Squadron RFC
- Awards: Military Cross with Bar, Belgian Order of Leopold and Croix de guerre

James Martin Child MC* (20 October 1893 – 23 August 1918) was a World War I flying ace. A British citizen living in Canada when the war began, he returned home for service. After being assigned to the Royal Flying Corps, he was credited with eight aerial victories. He died while rescuing a fellow pilot from a crashed aircraft.

== Early life ==
James Martin Child, son of Constance Octavio and Tylney Harris Child of Leytonstone, England, was born on 20 October 1893. The youthful Child moved to Canada, worked in a bank, and was a prospector for minerals. He was still in Canada when the First World War started.

== World War I ==
Child was a Canadian militia member; however, somehow he couldn't return to England with the Canadian Expeditionary Force, so he paid his own passage home to England. Once there, he was commissioned into the Durham Light Infantry. He then transferred to the Manchester Regiment. He was seconded to the Royal Flying Corps in the first half of 1916. He first served in No. 4 Squadron, but was posted to No. 19 Squadron in July 1916 as a Royal Aircraft Factory B.E.12 pilot.

He scored his first victory on 23 April 1917. On 12 May 1917, Second Lieutenant Child, who was already serving as a temporary lieutenant, was appointed a temporary captain for service as a Flight Commander. He was also Mentioned in Despatches. He scored three victories in all while flying Spad VIIs during April, May and June 1917 before he was removed from combat. Subsequently, on 28 September 1917, the King of Belgium invested him as a Chevalier in the Order of Leopold II.

He returned to combat as a flight commander in No. 84 Squadron and tallied five more victories during October and November 1917 while piloting Royal Aircraft Factory SE.5a serial number B562. Once again relieved from combat duty, he returned to England in February 1918, detailed as an instructor.

On 15 March 1918, he was awarded the Belgian War Cross. It was followed by the Military Cross, gazetted on 5 July 1918:

Lieutenant (Temporary Captain) James Martin Child, Manchester Regiment and Royal Flying Corps For conspicuous gallantry and devotion to duty. While leading a patrol he encountered four enemy scouts, one of which he destroyed. On another occasion he attacked one of two enemy two-seater machines which he encountered over the enemy's lines. He disabled the machine, and skilfully turned it towards our lines, where the enemy pilot was forced to land and he and his observer were taken prisoner. On another occasion he attacked five enemy scouts, one of which he destroyed. He showed the greatest judgment and determination.

Child died rescuing fellow officers from the wreckage of a plane crash at Drakemyre, Scotland. His remains were repatriated and buried in Plot C.R. 7284 of Chingford Mount Cemetery in his native London. His brother, Jack Escott Child, as well as his sister, were subsequently interred in that same grave.
