= The Krays (film) =

1990 British film by Peter Medak

- Original UK theatrical release poster
- Directed by: Peter Medak
- Written by: Philip Ridley
- Produced by: Dominic Anciano; Ray Burdis
- Starring: Billie Whitelaw; Tom Bell; Gary Kemp; Martin Kemp
- Cinematography: Alex Thomson
- Edited by: Martin Walsh
- Music by: Michael Kamen
- Production companies: Fugitive Features; Parkfield Entertainment
- Distributed by: Rank Film Distributors
- Release date: 27 April 1990
- Running time: 119 minutes
- Country: United Kingdom
- Language: English
- Box office: $62.3 million

The Krays is a 1990 British biographical crime drama film directed by Peter Medak. The film is based on the lives and crimes of the British gangster twins Ronald and Reginald Kray, often referred to as the Krays. The film stars Billie Whitelaw, Tom Bell, and real-life brothers (although not twins) Gary and Martin Kemp, both of whom were members of the band Spandau Ballet.

== Plot ==
The film explores the lives of the Kray twins from childhood to adulthood. The plot focuses on the relationship between the twins and their doting mother. Ronald is the dominant one, influencing his brother Reginald to perform several acts of violence as they rise to power as the leaders of a powerful organised gang in 1960s London. The movie focuses on the personal life of the brothers, including Reg's marriage and then alienation from his wife, who commits suicide.

The movie takes some liberties with historical facts, as it omits the police investigation of the Krays, which led to a trial, convictions and imprisonment. It ends with a jump-cut to their attending their mother's funeral in 1982, having been temporarily released from prison to do so.

== Cast ==
- Billie Whitelaw as Violet Kray
- Tom Bell as Jack McVitie
- Gary Kemp as Ronnie Kray
- Martin Kemp as Reggie Kray
- Susan Fleetwood as Rose
- Charlotte Cornwell as May
- Kate Hardie as Frances Kray
- Avis Bunnage as Helen
- Alfred Lynch as Charlie Kray Sr.
- Gary Love as Steve
- Steven Berkoff as George Cornell
- Jimmy Jewel as Cannonball Lee
- Barbara Ferris as Mrs. Lawson
- Victor Spinetti as Mr. Lawson
- John McEnery as Eddie Pellam
- Patti Love as Iris
- Norman Rossington as Shopkeeper
- Michael Balfour as Referee
- Jimmy Flint as Perry
- Michael Joseph Carr as Eddie
- Ian Burfield as Whip
- Murray Melvin as Newsagent
- Sadie Frost as Sharon Pellam
- Stephen Lewis as Policeman
- Angus MacInnes as Palendri
- Jamie Bennett as Reggie Kray aged 12
- Jason Bennett as Ronnie Kray aged 12
- Dave Courtney as Bill

== Production ==
While at the offices of Fugitive Features, the company that produced his two short films Visiting Mr. Beak and The Universe of Dermot Finn, Philip Ridley overheard two executives discussing their efforts to make a film about the Kray twins and how over the course of 20 years various producers and screenwriters had failed to produce anything. Acting on speculation and without informing the producers, Ridley spent three weeks during a Christmas holiday developing a script that was immediately accepted by the producers, which Ridley attributed to avoiding getting bogged down in historical details.

== Reception ==
The Krays holds a rating of 82% on Rotten Tomatoes, based on 17 reviews. Metacritic, which uses a weighted average, assigned the film a score of 70 out of 100, based on 18 critics, indicating "generally favorable" reviews.

In November 2024, the film's co-producer Ray Burdis said that he regretted "glamourising" Ronnie and Reggie Kray. "They weren't folk heroes," he told The Guardian. "They were just a pair of cowardly psychopathic bullies, who terrorised the East End of London in the 1960s."

=== Box office ===
The film opened at the top of the UK box office grossing £1,036,117 in its opening week, and remained at number one for a second week. It ultimately grossed £3,707,649 in the UK. In North America, where it was distributed by Miramax, the film opened with $948,002 and went on to gross $1,201,523 domestically. Its reported worldwide box office total is $62,300,000.

=== Awards ===
- Nominee Best Supporting Actress – BAFTA (Billie Whitelaw)
- Winner Best Film – Evening Standard British Film Awards (Peter Medak)
- Winner Most Promising Newcomer – Evening Standard British Film Awards (Philip Ridley)
- Winner Best Actress – International Fantasy Film Awards (Fantasporto) (Billie Whitelaw)
- Nominee Best Film – International Fantasy Film Awards (Fantasporto) (Peter Medak)
- Winner George Delerue Prize for Music – Film Fest Gent (Michael Kamen)

== See also ==
- Legend, a 2015 film about the Krays with Tom Hardy playing both brothers
