= Our Story (book) =

Book by Kray twins

- Author: Ronnie Kray and Reginald Kray with Fred Dinenage
- Language: English
- Genre: Autobiography
- Publisher: Sidgwick & Jackson 1988 - Pan Books 1989
- Publication date: 1988 and 8 September 1989
- Media type: Print (Hardback) (Paperback)
- Pages: 224
- ISBN: 0-283-99525-4
- OCLC: 18416022

Our Story is an autobiographical book by Ronnie and Reggie Kray with Fred Dinenage. It was first released in 1988 by Sidgwick & Jackson, and in paperback on 8 September 1989 by Pan Books.

== Synopsis ==
Our Story is an autobiography by the Kray Twins, assisted by their ghostwriter, first published in 1988. The twins were notorious East End underworld gang leaders during the "swinging" sixties. This book tells their story from their humble beginnings in Bethnal Green to their life imprisonment in 1969, largely in their own words.

The hardback and the Pan paperback versions contain 16 pages of black and white photographs of the twins and their friends, associates and enemies/victims.

The book's Foreword and its "A Final Word" are authored by Fred Dinenage. Thirteen Chapters are ghostwritten with the twins, jointly and individually. Reg and Ron Kray are credited as the authors of: 1. Memories of an East End Childood; 2. Crime and Punishment; and 8. The Women We Loved. Reg nominally authors: 3. The Swinging Sixties; 6. The Last Supper - the Killing of Jack McVitie; 9. Life in Parkhurst; 11. Life in Gartree; and 13. Just a Thought. Ron nominally authors: 4. The Killing of George Cornell; 5. The Truth about the Mad Axman (i.e. Frank Mitchell); 7. The Trial and the Traitors; 10. Life in Broadmoor ... 'Without my drugs I go mad'; and 12. Poetry and Painting.

According to a later edition, Ron Kray died in Broadmoor Hospital in 1995, while Reg was released on compassionate grounds in 2000, only to die of cancer in that October. Reg Kray approached their ghostwriter Dinenage to help them tell their story, because Reggie had admired the journalist's Television South's sports and documentary programmes.
