= Tony Lambrianou =

English criminal (1942–2004)

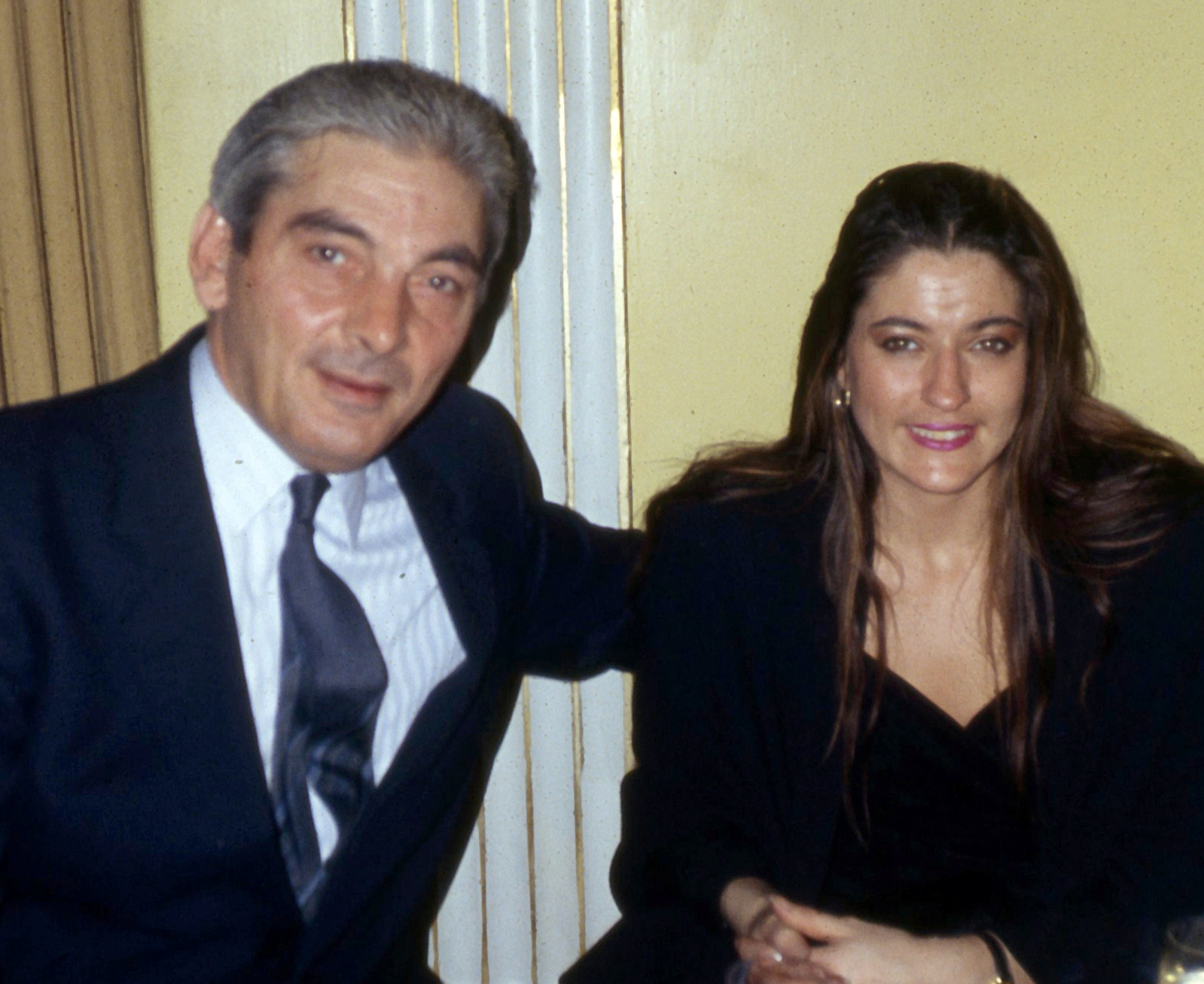
At a party following his appearance on television series After Dark in 1991

Anthony Thomas Lambrianou (15 April 1942 – 26 March 2004) was an English criminal known for his association with the Kray Twins. He was born in Bethnal Green to a Greek Cypriot father and English mother from Consett.

Lambrianou served 15 years in jail for his part in the murder of Jack "The Hat" McVitie in 1967. Lambrianou died in Kent, England, aged 61.

== Publications ==
- Inside the Firm: The Untold Story of the Krays' Reign of Terror. 1991.
