= Frances Kray =

Wife of Reggie Kray (1943–1967)

- Born: Frances Shea; 23 September 1943; Shoreditch, London, England
- Died: June 7, 1967 (aged 23); Hackney, London, England
- Resting place: Chingford Mount Cemetery, London, England
- Occupation: Clerical secretary
- Spouse: Reggie Kray (m. 1965)

Frances Kray (née Shea; 23 September 1943 – 7 June 1967) was an English clerical secretary who became a prominent figure in the London social scene of the 1960s as the first wife of the East End gangster Reggie Kray.

== Early life ==
Frances Shea was born on 23 September 1943 in Shoreditch, East London, to Frank and Elsie Shea. She grew up in a working-class household where her father worked as a docker. Shea was described by acquaintances and biographers as a sensitive and bright child with an interest in art and fashion.

After completing her secondary education, she sought a career in clerical work, eventually securing a position as a clerical secretary for a firm located on The Strand in central London. Her life remained relatively conventional until 1959, when, at the age of 16, she met Reggie Kray, who was ten years her senior. The introduction was made through her elder brother, Frank Shea, who was a close associate and driver for the Kray twins. Despite the age gap and her parents' initial reservations regarding Reggie's criminal reputation, the two began a long and often turbulent courtship that lasted six years before their marriage in 1965.

== Marriage ==
Shea married Reggie Kray on 19 April 1965 at St James's Church in Bethnal Green. The event was a significant occasion in the East End, drawing large crowds of spectators and heavy media interest. The wedding was famously documented by the renowned fashion photographer David Bailey, which further cemented the couple's status within the "Swinging Sixties" social scene of London. Following the ceremony, the couple honeymooned in Athens, Greece. Upon their return, they moved into a flat in Custom House, though the marriage was reportedly strained by the lifestyle associated with the Kray twins' criminal empire, known as "The Firm". Despite the public glamour of their union, Shea often found herself isolated from her own family as she navigated the complexities of her husband's high-profile and volatile reputation.

== Death and burial ==
Frances Kray died on 7 June 1967, aged 23. She was found dead in her brother Frank's flat at Wimbourne Court, Hackney. The subsequent coroner's inquest at Shoreditch ruled the cause of death as a barbiturate overdose, and recorded a verdict of suicide.

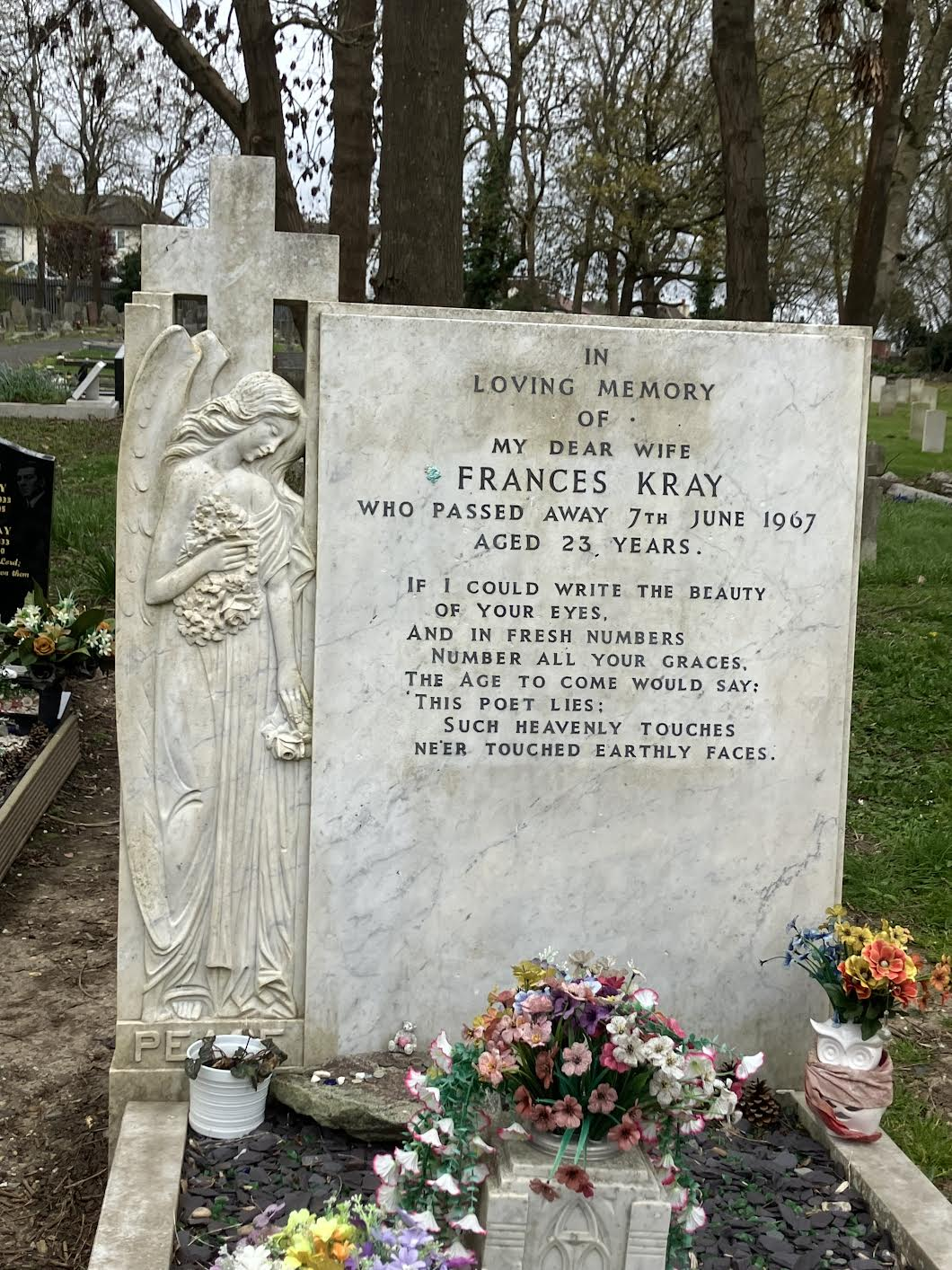
Frances Kray's tombstone in Chingford Mount cemetery

Kray was buried in June 1967 at Chingford Mount Cemetery, located in the London Borough of Waltham Forest, in the Kray family plot. Following her burial, a long-standing dispute occurred between the Shea and Kray families. Her mother, Elsie Shea, petitioned the Home Office in 1969 to have Frances's body exhumed and moved to a separate grave, to be buried under her maiden name, Shea. The request was denied because Reggie Kray, as her legal next of kin, refused to grant permission from prison. She remains buried in the same plot as Reggie, Ronnie, and Charlie Kray.

== In popular culture ==
Frances has been portrayed by several actors in films and TV programmes: in The Krays (1990), she was played by Kate Hardie; in Legend (2015) by Emily Browning; and in The Krays: Dead Man Walking (2018) by Triana Terry. In the episode of Evil Twins (a documentary series) titled "Twin Kings of London", she was portrayed by Maggie Wilder.
