= A Way of Life: Over Thirty Years of Blood, Sweat and Tears =

Autographical book by Reginald Kray

- Author: Reginald Kray
- Language: English
- Genre: autobiography
- Publisher: Sidgwick & Jackson
- Publication date: 2000
- Media type: Print (Hardcover and Paperback)
- Pages: 304
- ISBN: 0283073195

A Way of Life: Over Thirty Years of Blood, Sweat and Tears is an autobiographical book written by Reginald Kray describing his personal highs and lows throughout his 30 years inside the British prison system. First published in hardback in 2000 by Sidgwick & Jackson and in paperback by Pan Books in 2001.
