= John William Tripe =

John William Tripe

John William Tripe (26 February 1821 – 7 April 1892) was an English physician of the Victorian era and President of the Royal Meteorological Society (1871–72).

Tripe was born in London in 1821, one of 11 children born to Mary née Broad (1795–1874) and Dr John Tripe (1789–1841). He was educated at the Merchant Taylor's School before studying medicine at the London Hospital, where he was awarded two gold medals. He became a Licentiate of the Worshipful Society of Apothecaries (LSA) in 1843 before making further studies in medicine at the University of St Andrews from where he graduated as a Doctor of Medicine in 1846. He became MRCS (England) in 1848 and MRCP (Edinburgh) in 1879. He became a Licentiate in Midwifery (LM) in 1853. Tripe was Medical Officer of Health for Hackney from 1856 to his death in 1892. He married Elizabeth Thomson on 10 October 1850; she died in 1860. In 1864 he married Grace Wright (1841–1901), with whom he had two children: Mary Grace Tripe (1870–1941) and John Henry Tripe (1874–1913), who, like his father and grandfather, became a doctor.

Tripe joined the Royal Meteorological Society as a young man; he was elected a Fellow in 1856, and served on the council with a break of only a year from 1858 to his death in 1892. He held the office of President in 1871–72; of vice-president in 1860–61, 1863–64, 1869–70; and of Secretary in 1865–66, 1868 and 1873–1892.

John William Tripe died aged 71 in London in 1892 leaving £3,836 15s 7d in his will. He is buried with his second wife and his son in Chingford Mount Cemetery.

== Obituary ==
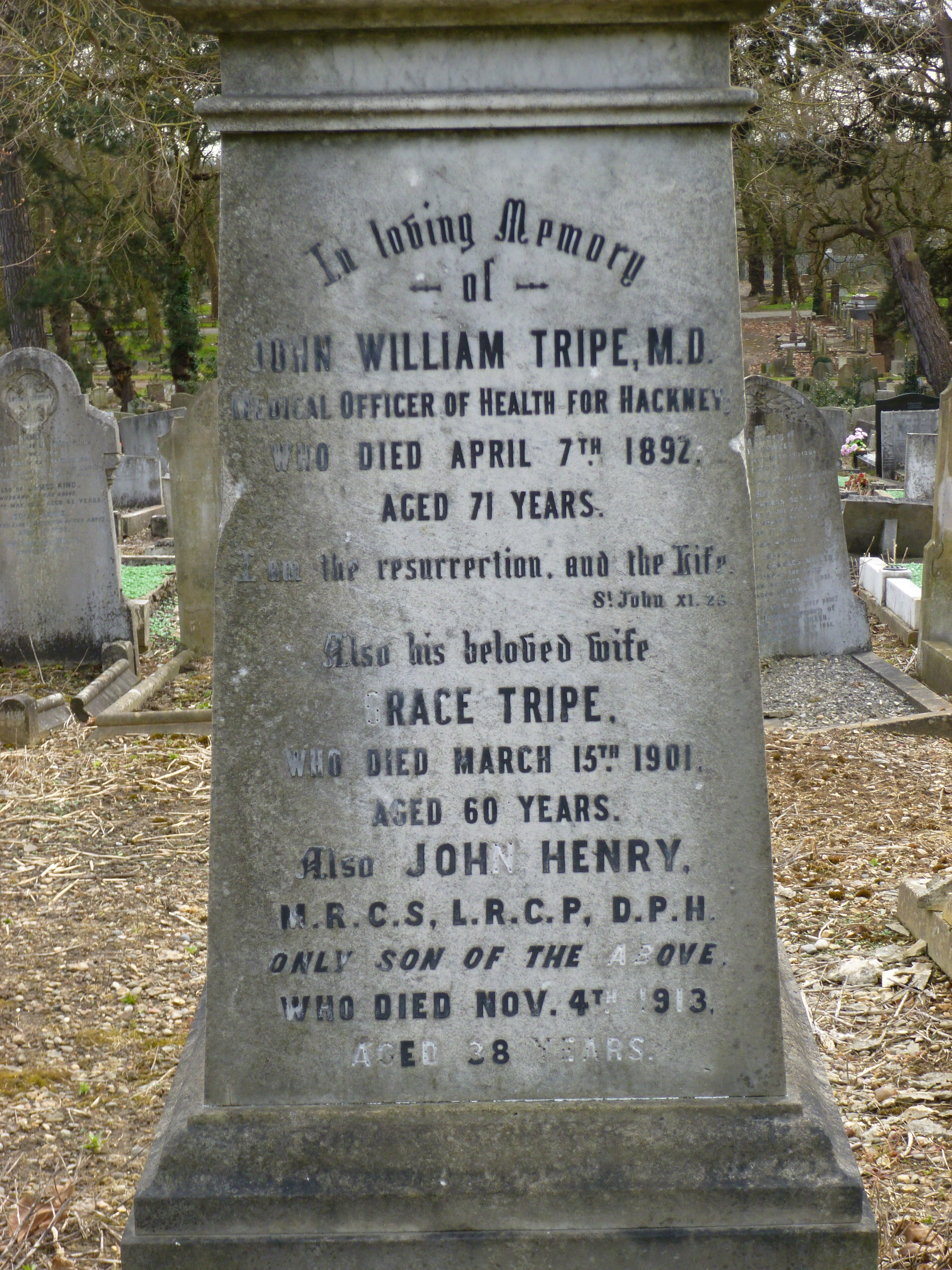
The grave of John William Tripe in Chingford Mount Cemetery

Tripe's obituary was published in the British Medical Journal on 30 April 1892:

"The career of Dr. Tripe, whose death at the age of 72 was announced in the British Medical Journal of 16 April, was so distinguished in its relation to the progress of hygiene that we feel it right to record some of his many claims to the esteem of the profession and the gratitude of those amongst whom he worked.

Following the passage of Sir Benjamin Hall's Act, which empowered the districts of the metropolis to appoint medical officers of health, Dr. Tripe was elected for Hackney, a position he held for the remainder of his life. Hackney was regarded as one of the best-served districts under his tenure. He devoted significant effort to improving the health of the population under his care. His work, however, extended beyond the boundaries of the parish. The position of medical officer of health attracted many young professionals seeking to establish their careers following the implementation of the Act. Some later moved into other, often more lucrative, fields. Tripe, however, focused on sanitary science as his primary area of study.

He was among those whose work contributed to the development of public medicine as an integral part of internal administration. Other figures, including Letheby, Odling, and Tidy, advanced the application of chemistry to hygiene. Simon, Seaton, Ballard, Buchanan, Dudfield, and Corfield also gained recognition for their contributions to the field.

For thirty-six years Dr. Tripe held office. His annual reports to his vestry were conspicuous for clearness of insight into his duties, and the faithful, efficient, and temperate manner in which his advice was set forth. The esteem in which he was held by his brother medical officers was declared by electing him President of their Association. The ever-lamented Professor Parkes soon discovered his worth, and associated him in the work of the British and Foreign Medico-Chirurgical Review. Under Parkes's editorship Tripe contributed valuable memoirs on 'Scarlatinal Dropsy and the Mortality from the Eruptive Fevers'; and, under Dr. Sieveking, he contributed a paper on 'The Relative Mortality of Males and Females under Five Years of Age', and one on 'Poisoning by Sausages'. Sir Edward Sieveking says of him: " I think all his articles would deserve reading at the present day, as they show much research and observation." But, as we have already intimated, his great merit consisted in throwing the light of the allied science of meteorologymore especially on the problems of hygiene.

He early in life joined the Royal Meteorological Society, and the part he played in it was no less honourable to himself than signal in its services to the Society. No one could be associated with him without being charmed with his manner-at once earnest and simple. His gentle wisdom and steadiness of purpose rarely failed to command the warm reception of his proposals. The Society was largely indebted to him for its prosperity; and this debt it was always ready to acknowledge. He was elected a Fellow in 1856, and served on the council with only one year's intermission from 1858 to the time of his death. He held the office of President in 1871–72; of vice-president in 1860–61, 1863–64, 1869–70; of Secretary in 1865–66, 1868, 1873–1892. He attended as Secretary not long before his death. He contributed to the Transactions of the Society: 'Some Observations on the Climate and Mortality of London in 1857, deduced from the Records of the Medical Officers of Health and the Returns of the Registrar-General'; (2) On the Meteorology and Mortality of 1858; (3) On the Medical Meteorology of the Metropolis during the Years 1859, 1860, and 1861'; (4) 'Presidential Addresses in 1872–73'; (5) 'On the Winter Climate of Some English Sea-side Health Resorts'; (6) 'On Some Relations of Meteorological Phenomena to Health'; (7) 'Ball Lightning Seen during a Thunderstorm on 11 July 1874'.

The appreciation expressed by Sir Edward Sieveking of his other writings applies with equal force to these. The Society, at its general meeting held on 20 April, expressed its sense of the loss it had sustained in the following resolution, proposed by the President (Dr. Theodore Williams), and supported by Mr. Symons, F.R.S., his fellow Secretary; Mr. Marriott, Assistant Secretary; and Dr. Robert Barnes:

"The Council and Fellows of the Royal Meteorological Society have heard with deep regret of the death of their esteemed Secretary, Dr. J. W. Tripe. Dr. Tripe was an M.D. of St. Andrews, M.R.C.P. of Edinburgh, M.R.C.S. of England. He was a student of the London Hospital. His scientific work had received honourable recognition from the French Society of Hygiene, which made him Foreign Associate; the Royal Society of Public Medicine of Belgium also elected him Honorary Fellow. The resolution of the Meteorological Society will be universally accepted as a just tribute to the memory of an able, honest, and successful worker. His personal charm will live in the hearts of his surviving friends. His face attracted the affection and esteem of all who came in contact with him, beaming as it did with the light of intelligence and goodness."
