= Nipper Read =

British police officer and boxing administrator (1925–2020)

- Born: Leonard Ernest Read; 31 March 1925; Nottingham, England
- Died: 7 April 2020 (aged 95)
- Occupations: Policeman and boxing administrator
- Spouses: Marion Millar (m. 1951; div. 1979) Pat Allen (m. 1980)
- Children: 1

Leonard Ernest "Nipper" Read (31 March 1925 – 7 April 2020) was a British police officer and boxing administrator.

== Early life ==
Leonard Ernest Read was born in Nottingham on 31 March 1925, the son of Leonard Read Snr., who worked for a leather company, and his wife Ida (née Morris). His mother died when he was four and he was sent to live with her brother. After their father remarried, Leonard and his two sisters and brother returned to live with their father and stepmother.

Read did well in school, always being one of the top three pupils in junior and senior school. He played the lead role in a school production of David Copperfield. He also learned to box, winning his first medal in 1937. He later joined the Grundy boxing club, where he was nicknamed "Nipper". Read had hoped to attend Nottingham High School and passed the entrance exam, but his father could not afford the uniform and fees for books. He left school at 14 and later in life regretted not being able to stretch himself academically.

Read began working in a Players cigarette warehouse in 1939, earning ten shillings a week, eight of which he gave to his stepmother.

== Career ==
Read was called up in 1943 and served as a petty officer in the Royal Navy during the Second World War.

Read could not join the Nottingham City Police which had a minimum height requirement of 6 feet (1.8 m). Instead, he joined the Metropolitan Police in 1947, which had a minimum height requirement of 5 feet 8 inches (1.73 m), telling the medical examiner he was still growing. Because of his small stature he was taken out of the uniform branch and made an aide to CID. His acting ability came in useful and he worked in disguise in several roles, on the basis that nobody would believe he was a police officer.

As a detective constable, Read was sent to Harlesden, where he worked under Bert "Suits" Hannam. He was then transferred to Paddington, where he worked with senior first-class sergeant Tommy Butler. Because of Butler's secretive nature, he had to learn from the other first-class sergeant, Frank Gloyne. While at Paddington he was involved on the periphery of the Jack Spot case, where the "King of the Underworld" sought protection from his rival Billy Hill.

Read was promoted to detective sergeant in 1958 and transferred to Chelsea to replace Raymond Purdy, who had been shot by the burglar and blackmailer Guenther Podola. While there he was seconded to the Buckinghamshire Constabulary after the Great Train Robbery. It was his introduction to the investigation of a major crime, but also to the infighting between officers investigating such a case. After this case he was promoted to detective inspector at Leman Street. He was detective chief superintendent of the Met's Murder Squad in 1967, and the efforts of detectives led by him were responsible for the conviction of Ronnie and Reggie Kray.

In a career spanning thirty years, only one murder case he investigated, the Babes in the Wood, remained unsolved during his career; the perpetrator confessed in 1998. Read retired from the police force in 1977.

Read held various positions as a boxing administrator, including chairman of the British Boxing Board of Control from 1976 to 2000, vice president of the World Boxing Council and vice-president of the World Boxing Association from 1989 to 2001. He also published an autobiography with the ghostwriter James Morton, Nipper (1991); the book was republished in 2001 under the name Nipper Read: The Man Who Nicked the Krays.

== Personal life ==
Read married Marion Millar in 1951; the couple divorced in 1979. In 1980, he married Pat Allen, who had worked with him on the Kray enquiry.

Read died on 7 April 2020, one week after his 95th birthday, while hospitalised for a foot infection. He was survived by his second wife and his daughter from his first marriage.

== In popular culture ==
- Read was the basis for the character Harry "Snapper" Organs, portrayed by Terry Jones, in the satirical documentary on the Piranha Brothers (themselves modelled on the Richardson Gang and the Kray twins) from the 1970 series 2 premiere episode of Monty Python's Flying Circus ("Face the Press")
- Read was portrayed by Christopher Eccleston in the film Legend (2015)
- Read was portrayed by Danny Midwinter in the films The Rise of the Krays (2015) and The Fall of the Krays (2016)
- Read was portrayed by Stephen Moyer in the film Code of Silence (2021)
- Read is a character in Simon Michael's novels The Final Shot and Nothing but the Truth, appearing under his own name
