= Legend (2015 film) =

2015 film by Brian Helgeland

- British theatrical release poster
- Directed by: Brian Helgeland
- Screenplay by: Brian Helgeland
- Based on: The Profession of Violence (1972 book) by John Pearson
- Produced by: Tim Bevan; Eric Fellner; Chris Clark; Quentin Curtis; Brian Oliver
- Starring: Tom Hardy; Emily Browning; David Thewlis; Duffy; Christopher Eccleston; Chazz Palminteri
- Cinematography: Dick Pope
- Edited by: Peter McNulty
- Music by: Carter Burwell
- Production companies: Cross Creek Pictures; StudioCanal; Working Title Films; Anton Capital Entertainment
- Distributed by: StudioCanal (International); Universal Pictures (US)
- Release dates: 3 September 2015 (London); 9 September 2015 (UK); 20 November 2015 (US); 20 January 2016 (France)
- Running time: 131 minutes
- Countries: United Kingdom; France; United States
- Language: English
- Budget: $25 million
- Box office: $43 million

Legend is a 2015 biographical gangster film written and directed by Brian Helgeland, adapted from John Pearson's 1972 book The Profession of Violence: The Rise and Fall of the Kray Twins. The film follows the Kray twins' career and relationship together through their convictions for murder and sentencing to life imprisonment in 1969. Tom Hardy plays both Reggie and Ron Kray in a dual role.

The film also stars Emily Browning, David Thewlis and Christopher Eccleston, with Colin Morgan, Chazz Palminteri, Paul Bettany, Tara Fitzgerald, Taron Egerton and Duffy in supporting roles.

An international co-production between British, French, and American companies, Legend premiered in London on 3 September 2015, before being released in the UK by StudioCanal on 9 September. The film received mixed reviews from critics, though Tom Hardy's dual performance was widely praised, and earned him a British Independent Film Award for Best Actor.

== Plot ==
In the 1960s, Reggie "Reg" Kray is a former boxer who has become an important part of the criminal underground in London. His twin brother Ron is locked in a psychiatric hospital and being treated for paranoid schizophrenia. Reggie uses threats to obtain the premature release of his brother. The twins unite their efforts to control a large part of London's criminal underworld, made easier when the head of the south London Richardson Gang (a.k.a. the Torture Gang) is imprisoned. One of their first efforts is to muscle in on the control of a local nightclub, using extortion and brutal violence.

Reg enters into a relationship with Frances, his driver's sister, whom he eventually marries. When he is imprisoned for a previous criminal conviction, which he cannot evade, she makes him swear that he will leave his criminal life behind. He never honours this oath because of the allure of crime. While Reg is in prison, Ron's mental instability and violent temperament result in severe financial setbacks at the nightclub, as well as his thinly-veiled hostility and jealousy towards Frances. It is almost forced to close after Ron scares away most of the customers. On the first night after Reg's release from prison, the brothers have an all-out fist fight, but they manage to patch things up, at least partially.

The reputation of the brothers has spread to the United States. They are approached by Angelo Bruno of the Philadelphia crime family who, on behalf of Meyer Lansky and the American Mafia, wants to engage them in a crime-syndicate deal. Bruno agrees to a fifty-fifty deal with Reg to split London's underground gambling profits in exchange for local protection by the brothers. Initially, this system is highly lucrative for the Kray brothers; however, Ron's paranoia and inclination towards violence causes problems for Reg's efforts to maintain control—Ron (who enjoys the violence of being a gangster) clashes with Reggie's restraint and insight. Ron's barely concealed volatility results in his publicly murdering George Cornell, an associate of the Torture Gang; when he goes to the Kray family home afterward, Reggie and Ron's mother asks Reggie to protect Ron: "He's your brother". As a result, Scotland Yard opens a full investigation of the Kray brothers.

Reg's marriage with Frances crumbles owing to his addiction to crime. Unable to bear Reg's false promises to reform and Ron's hatred of her, Frances starts consuming prescription drugs illegally. After Reggie beats and rapes her in a fit of rage, she leaves him. When Reg approaches her to reconcile, Frances seems to agree and they plan to visit Ibiza, but she kills herself with a drug overdose. Reg is ridden with guilt.

The twins continue their criminal activities. Ron pays petty criminal Jack "the Hat" McVitie to kill Leslie Payne, Reg's partner, who controls the legal side of the Krays' operations, as he does not trust Payne. Jack only wounds Payne, who turns on the brothers, informing on them to Detective Superintendent Leonard "Nipper" Read, the head of the investigation and a longtime nemesis of the Krays.

When Reg finds out, he brutally stabs McVitie to death with a knife during a party hosted by Ron. The testimony Payne has given results in Ron being arrested and charged with Cornell's murder. A police squad breaks down the door to Reg's flat in order to apprehend him for McVitie's murder; it is said they found him with two tickets to Ibiza still in his pocket.

Both brothers received criminal convictions for murder and sentences for life imprisonment. They died five years apart, Ron from a heart attack in 1995, and Reggie from bladder cancer in 2000.

== Cast ==
- Tom Hardy as Reggie Kray and Ron Kray, identical twin brothers who in the 1960s became notorious gangsters and led one of the most feared criminal organizations in the UK, known as The Firm.
- Emily Browning as Frances Shea, wife of Reggie Kray and younger sister of Frankie Shea (Reggie Kray's personal driver).
- David Thewlis as Leslie Payne, a well-known businessman and con-man who works as a business manager for the Kray Twins and The Firm.
- Christopher Eccleston as Nipper Read, the Detective Chief Superintendent of the Met's Murder Squad who led the manhunt that led to the arrest and conviction of the Kray Twins in 1969.
- Chazz Palminteri as Angelo "The Gentle Don" Bruno, a powerful Italian-American mafia boss and head of the Philadelphia crime family (one of the most powerful families in the Italian-American Mafia) who travels to London as an emissary and intermediary for Meyer Lansky (the head of National Crime Syndicate).
- Paul Anderson as Albert Donoghue, an Irish gangster, bank robber, and getaway driver who was a high-ranking member of The Firm, acting as Reggie Kray's right-hand man.
- Colin Morgan as Frankie Shea, older brother of Frances Shea and Reggie Kray's personal driver/brother-in-law.
- Mel Raido as Ian Barrie, an Anglo-Scottish gangster and getaway driver who was a high-ranking member of The Firm, acting as Ronnie Kray's right-hand man.
- Sam Spruell as Jack McVitie, a notorious English drug lord, contract killer and gangster who worked as a enforcer and hitman for The Firm.
- Tara Fitzgerald as Mrs Shea, mother of Frances and Frankie Shea and mother-in-law of Reggie Kray.
- Duffy as Timi Yuro, a famous American singer who was a frequent attraction at clubs controlled by the Kray twins in London and of whom Reggie Kray is a huge fan.
- Taron Egerton as Mad Teddy Smith, an openly gay gangster and psychopath who was a member of The Firm and alleged lover of Ronnie Kray.
- Charley Palmer Rothwell as Leslie Holt, a cat burglar, antique dealer and former boxer who was Lord Boothby's chauffeur and lover.
- Kevin McNally as Harold Wilson, the prime minister of the United Kingdom from 1964 to 1970 and 1974 to 1976.
- Alex Giannini as Antonio Caponigro, the consigliere of Angelo Bruno in the Philadelphia crime family.
- John Sessions as Lord Boothby, a British Conservative politician accused of having a relationship with Ronnie Kray.
- Robert Ashby as Arnold Goodman, a prominent attorney and fixer.
- Paul Bettany (uncredited) as Charlie Richardson, whose South London Richardson Gang (also known as the Torture Gang) engaged in a turf war with the Krays.

== Production ==
=== Development ===
On 12 October 2013, it was announced that Brian Helgeland had written a script and would be directing a film focusing on the life of Reggie Kray who, with identical brother Ronald, formed the notorious Kray twins. Helgeland said the film would concentrate on Reggie's attempts to control the psychopathic tendencies of his younger twin.

Helgeland spoke of hanging out in London with well-known Krays associate Freddie Foreman, saying, "I had drinks with him in his local haunt. When we finished he got up to go and they feted him at the bar. I said to him, 'what about the bill?' and he replied, 'we don't pay.'"

Helgeland attended the Cannes Film Festival with Working Title's Tim Bevan and Chris Clark to talk to potential buyers of the film and showing test footage of Hardy playing the twins.

=== Casting ===
On 18 April 2014, it was announced that Helgeland would write and direct the film, with the shooting being based in the United Kingdom and with Hardy starring as the male leads. Five days later, it was stated that Browning was in negotiations for a role as the film's female lead. Hardy was so set on playing Ronnie Kray that he proposed to Helgeland that if he gave him the role of Ronnie, Hardy would play the role of Reggie for free.

=== Filming ===
Crews and cast were spotted filming scenes at Falmouth Road, London, St Anne's Limehouse in Limehouse and in the Windmill Walk area around London Waterloo. Filming also took place in Caradoc Street in Greenwich, in the Cedra Estate on Cazenove Road and in Gibson Gardens, both of which are in Hackney.

Principal photography started on 12 June 2014.

== Release ==
Financing for Legend was provided by StudioCanal, which also distributed in the United Kingdom, France, New Zealand and Germany in addition to handling international sales, which started at the beginning of the Cannes Film Festival. On 30 April 2014, Cross Creek Pictures acquired the North American distribution rights to Legend from StudioCanal, with a planned 2015 theatrical release through Universal Pictures in its distribution deal with the studio. Sales to other territories such as Asia, Africa and much of Europe are being completed. The film was originally set for release in the US on 2 October 2015, but it was moved to 20 November 2015.

The film made its North American debut at the Toronto International Film Festival on 12 September 2015 at Roy Thomson Hall.

=== Marketing ===
On 13 June 2014, the first image of the film was published, featuring Hardy as the Kray twins. A promotional poster attracted publicity because it made a two-star review from The Guardian appear to be at least a four-star review by placing the two stars between the heads of the Krays.

=== Home media ===
Legend was released on DVD and Blu-ray in the United Kingdom on 25 January 2016 and in the United States on 1 March 2016.

== Reception ==
=== Critical reception ===
On the review aggregator website Rotten Tomatoes, 60% of 171 critics' reviews are positive, with an average rating of 5.9/10. The website's consensus reads: "As a gangster biopic, Legend is deeply flawed, but as a showcase for Tom Hardy—in a dual role, no less—it just about lives up to its title." Metacritic, which uses a weighted average, assigned the film a score of 55 out of 100, based on 31 critics, indicating "mixed or average" reviews.

=== Box office ===
Legend grossed US$28.0 million in the United Kingdom, and marked seven weeks in the Top 10 at the British box office. In addition, it grossed $1.9 million in Canada and the United States, and $13.1 million in other territories, for a worldwide total of $43.0 million, against a budget under $25 million.

=== Accolades ===
Year	Award	Category	Nominee(s)	Result	Ref.
2015	British Independent Film Awards	Best Performance by an Actor in a British Independent Film	Tom Hardy	Won	
2015	Detroit Film Critics Society	Best Actor	Tom Hardy	Nominated	
2015	Las Vegas Film Critics Society	Best Picture		Nominated	
2015	Satellite Awards	Best Actor – Motion Picture	Tom Hardy	Nominated	
2016	Empire Awards	Best British Film		Nominated	
2016	Empire Awards	Best Actor	Tom Hardy	Nominated	
2016	Houston Film Critics Society	Best Actor	Tom Hardy	Nominated	
2016	London Film Critics' Circle	Actor of the Year	Tom Hardy	Nominated	
2016	London Film Critics' Circle	British/Irish Actor of the Year	Tom Hardy	Won	
2016	Saturn Awards	Best International Film		Nominated	
2016	Toronto Film Critics Association	Best Actor	Tom Hardy	Won	
2017	Apolo Awards	Best Actor	Tom Hardy	Nominated	

== See also ==
- Category:Works about the Kray twins
