= Kray twins =

British criminal duo during 1950s and 1960s

Ronnie and Reggie Kray
- Reggie (left) and Ronnie Kray, photographed by David Bailey in 1965
- Born: 24 October 1933; Haggerston, London, England
- Died: Ronnie: 17 March 1995 (aged 61) Slough, Berkshire, England; Reggie: 1 October 2000 (aged 66) Norwich, Norfolk, England
- Occupations: Gangsters, nightclub owners
- Organization: The Firm
- Spouses: Reggie: Frances Shea (m. 1965; died 1967) Roberta Jones (m. 1997); Ronnie: Elaine Mildener (m. 1985; div. 1989) Kate Howard (m. 1989; div. 1994)
- Parent: Violet Kray (mother)
- Relatives: Charlie Kray (brother)

Kray Firm
- Years active: 1950s-1960s
- Territory: London
- Ethnicity: English
- Activities: Racketeering, extortion, robbery
- Allies: Bruno crime family
- Rivals: Richardson Firm

Ronald Kray (24 October 1933 – 17 March 1995) and Reginald Kray (24 October 1933 – 1 October 2000) were English identical twin brothers from Haggerston, East London, who were heavily involved in organised crime from the late 1950s until their arrest in 1968.

Their gang, known as the Firm, was based in Bethnal Green, where the Kray twins lived. They were involved in murder, armed robbery, arson, protection rackets, gambling and assaults. At their peak in the 1960s, the twins gained a certain measure of celebrity status by mixing with prominent members of London society, being photographed by David Bailey and interviewed on television.

The Krays were arrested on 8 May 1968 and convicted the following year as a result of the efforts of detectives led by Detective Superintendent Leonard "Nipper" Read. Each was sentenced to life imprisonment. Ronnie, upon being certified insane, was committed to Broadmoor Hospital in 1979 and remained there until his death in 1995 from a heart attack; Reggie was released from prison on compassionate grounds in August 2000, eight weeks before he died of cancer.

== Early life ==
Ronald and Reginald Kray were born on 24 October 1933 in Haggerston, East London, to Charles David Kray (1907–1983) and Violet Annie Lee (1909–1982). The Kray parents were thorough Eastenders—Charles from Shoreditch and Violet from Bethnal Green—and were apparently of mixed Irish, Austrian Jewish and Romanichal descent, although this has been disputed. The brothers were identical twins, with Reggie born ten minutes before Ronnie. Their parents already had a six-year-old son, Charles James (1927–2000). A sister, Violet (born 1929), died in infancy. The twins contracted diphtheria when they were three years old.

The Kray household was dominated by the twins' mother, who remained their most important influence during their childhood. Their father was a rag-and-bone man with a fondness for heavy drinking; his work led him to live a semi-nomadic lifestyle as he travelled all over southern England looking for junk to sell, and even when he was in London he frequented pubs more often than his home. The twins first attended Wood Close School in Brick Lane and then Daniel Street School, Bethnal Green. In 1938 the family moved from Stean Street in Haggerston to 178 Vallance Road in Bethnal Green.

Violet Kray was a minor celebrity in Bethnal Green, for giving birth to and raising a healthy pair of twins at a time when the child mortality rate was high among the British working class. In the interwar period, it was normal that one of the twins born into working-class families would die before adulthood, and it was most unusual that both the Kray twins survived, making their mother the object of much admiration in the local area, perhaps contributing to her perceived inflated ego. There was a feeling within Bethnal Green that there was an almost unnatural emotional closeness between the twins and their mother, who shunned the company of others.

Ronnie later stated about his childhood: "We had our mother, and we had each other, so we never needed no one else". Billy Wilshire, a cousin of the Krays who attended school with them, recalled: "It's hard to say exactly what it was, but they weren't like other children". The Krays' biographer, John Pearson, argued that their mother planted the seeds of the malignant narcissism that the twins would display as adults by encouraging her sons to think of themselves as being extraordinary, while spoiling their every whim.

During the Second World War, the Krays' father deserted from the British Army, having been conscripted in September 1939. He spent the next fifteen years living as a fugitive, being finally arrested in 1954. During this period, he was only irregularly involved in raising his family. Meanwhile, the twins were evacuated to East House in Hadleigh, Suffolk, with their mother and their older brother. The family remained in Hadleigh for about one year before moving back to London, as Violet missed her friends and family. While they were in Hadleigh, the twins attended Bridge Street Boys' School. In adulthood the twins would buy two homes in nearby Bildeston, one for themselves and another for their parents.

In a 1989 interview, Ronnie described Hadleigh as the twins' first time in the countryside, recalling that both were attracted to the "quietness, the peacefulness of it, the fresh air, nice scenery, nice countryside – different from London. We used to go to a big 'ill called Constitution Hill and used to go sledging there in the winter-time."

The influence of their maternal grandfather, Jimmy "Cannonball" Lee, caused the brothers to take up amateur boxing, then a popular pastime for working-class boys in the East End. Sibling rivalry spurred them on, and each achieved some success. Ronnie was considered to be the more aggressive of the twins, constantly getting into street fights as a teenager. The British scholar Jonathan Raban wrote that Ronnie had a "low IQ", but that he was an avid reader who especially liked books about T. E. Lawrence, Orde Wingate and Al Capone. Raban attributed much of Ronnie's "savage petulance" as a teenager to his rage over having to hide his bisexual tendencies. As well as this, the Krays hung around in the Blind Beggar pub in Whitechapel in East London.

=== Military service ===
The Kray twins were called up to do National Service in the British Army in March 1952. Although the pair reported to the depot of the Royal Fusiliers at the Tower of London, they attempted to leave after only a few minutes. When the corporal in charge tried to stop them, he was seriously injured by Ronnie when he punched him on the jaw. The Krays walked back to their East End home, where they were arrested the next morning by police and turned over to the army.

In September, while absent without leave (AWOL) again, the twins assaulted a police constable who tried to arrest them. They became among the last prisoners to be held at the Tower of London before being transferred to Shepton Mallet military prison in Somerset for a month to await court-martial. At Shepton Mallet they met Charlie Richardson, another inmate, who later formed the Richardson Gang, a rival of the Krays’ Firm. After their conviction, the twins were sent to the Buffs' Home Counties Brigade jail in Canterbury, Kent.

However, when it became clear that both would be dishonourably discharged from the army, the Krays' behaviour worsened. They dominated the exercise areas outside their one-man cells, threw tantrums, emptied a latrine bucket over a sergeant, dumped a canteen full of hot tea on another guard, handcuffed yet another guard to their prison bars with a pair of stolen handcuffs and set their bedding on fire. Eventually the twins were moved to a communal cell, where they assaulted their guard with a vase and escaped. After being quickly recaptured, the Krays spent their last night in military custody drinking cider, eating crisps and smoking cigarillos courtesy of the young national servicemen acting as their guards. The next day they were transferred to a civilian prison to serve sentences for the crimes they had committed while AWOL. Raban wrote that prison psychiatrists who examined Ronnie found him to be "educationally subnormal, psychopathic, schizophrenic and insane".

Despite their brief and disastrous military career, upon release, the Krays adopted an extremely militaristic style as Ronnie took to calling himself 'the Colonel', while their home at 178 Vallance Road was dubbed 'Fort Vallance'.

== Criminal careers ==
=== Nightclub owners ===
With their boxing careers ended by their criminal records and dishonourable discharges, the Kray twins turned to crime full-time. They bought a run-down snooker club in Mile End, where they started several protection rackets. By the end of the 1950s, they were working for Liverpool gangster Jay Murray and were involved in truck hijacking, armed robbery and arson, through which they acquired other clubs and properties. In 1960 Ronnie was imprisoned for eighteen months for running a protection racket. While Ronnie was in prison, Peter Rachman, head of a landlord operation, sold Reggie a nightclub called Esmeralda's Barn to ward off threats of further extortion. The location was where the Berkeley Hotel now stands.

Ownership of Esmeralda's Barn increased the Krays' influence in London's West End by making them celebrities as well as criminals. The twins adopted a norm according to which anyone who failed to show due respect would be severely punished, this usually consisted of excessive violence and harsh beatings. Both brothers notoriously laundered money through dog- and horse-tracks as well as through businesses, which led to several others being investigated during the mid-1960s for their part in the Krays' crimes. The twins were assisted by a banker named Alan Cooper, who wanted protection against the Krays' South London rivals, the aforementioned Richardson Gang.

Raban called Ronnie the "dimmer" of the two twins, writing that he was "a man whose grasp on reality was so slight and pathologically deranged that he was able to live out a crude, primarily coloured fiction, twisting the city into the shape of a bad thriller". Ronnie quite consciously modelled the style of the Firm on what he read about the Chicago underworld in Capone's time, for example getting his own personal barber to visit his flat to work on his hair because he had read somewhere that was the normal practice with Chicago gangsters in the 1920s.

=== Celebrity status ===
In the 1960s the Kray twins were widely seen as prosperous and charming celebrity nightclub owners and were part of the Swinging London scene. A large part of their fame was due to their non-criminal activities as popular figures on the celebrity circuit, being photographed by David Bailey on more than one occasion and socialising with lords, MPs, socialites and show-business characters, including Frank Sinatra, Peter Sellers, Joan Collins, Judy Garland, Diana Dors, George Raft, Sammy Davis Jr, Shirley Bassey, Liza Minnelli, Cliff Richard, Dusty Springfield, Jayne Mansfield, Richard Harris, Danny La Rue and Barbara Windsor.

They were the best years of our lives. They called them the swinging sixties. The Beatles and the Rolling Stones were rulers of pop music, Carnaby Street ruled the fashion world... and me and my brother ruled London. We were fucking untouchable.

— Ronnie Kray, My Story

Part of the Krays' newfound celebrity status was due to the widespread perception that the twins were men who had risen out of poverty into positions of great wealth and power by their own efforts. They were seen as an example, albeit a perverse one, of the meritocracy that was to replace the traditional class system. Furthermore the 1960s was a time when many social norms were being questioned, and the Krays were widely seen as rebels against what were perceived as sanctimonious and hypocritical traditional British values. The scholars Chris Jenks and Justin Lorentzen wrote that there was "a popular mistrust of the Establishment" in the 1960s and that as many young people "laughed Prime Minister Macmillan and President Johnson, their teachers and university lecturers and priests and moralists off the stage", the Krays were seen as folk heroes. This was a period of intense debates about consumerism, social mobility, sexuality, style and social tolerance, and the Krays were involved in all of them as symbols, either bad or good, of the changes taking place in British society.

The Krays greatly valued their image and cultivated the media by inviting journalists to take photographs of them with other celebrities at nightclubs or in making donations to charity. They went about in an obsessive way managing and promoting the image that they wanted, namely as benefactors who gave generously to charity and as men who had risen up from poverty to become rich and powerful. The sociologist Dick Hebdige wrote that the twins had "a sophisticated awareness of the importance of public relations matched only in the image-conscious field of American politics ... As we have seen, certain of the Krays' projects, when closely examined, take on a bizarre aspect more appropriate to the theatre than to the rational pursuit of profit by crime". In 1960 gambling in clubs was legalised in the United Kingdom, which for the first time allowed 'decent' people to gamble openly outside of betting on horse-racing. The Krays were the owners of four nightclubs where gambling was permitted, which not only allowed them to be seen as successful businessmen but also to socialise with 'decent' people who would have previously shunned the company of gangsters running a gambling den.

The Krays made a point of promoting a gangster chic image, with both dressed in a style that countless films had associated with gangsters, namely wearing "discreet, dark, double-breasted suits with tight-knotted ties and shoulder-padded overcoats. Combined with garish jewellery such as large gold rings, gold bracelet watches and diamond cuff links, the Krays conveyed a redoubtable image." The British scholar Ruth Penfold-Mounce described the twins as a classic example of the social bandit, criminals who became folk heroes because of the belief that they were standing up to a corrupt Establishment while also paradoxically being seen as upholding the better part of society's values. The twins were viewed in certain quarters as Robin Hood-type criminals whose crimes were seen as acceptable. Penfold-Mounce noted they combined an air of menace and violence with an image of "a romanticised air of heroic gentlemanliness, generosity and the apparent reinforcement of traditional social order parameters of conservatism and restraint." In this context the Krays made a point of stressing that there were limits to the values that they were willing to violate while promoting the image of themselves as the benefactors of society. For example they made a great point of stressing the image of being respectful towards women since they knew that the British public did not like men who were disrespectful. One former member of the Firm, Tony Lambrianou, stated that the positive image of the Krays was a myth, maintaining that the only people the brothers ever cared about were themselves.

Jenks and Lorentzen noted the image of the Krays had little to do with who the brothers actually were, describing the twins as considerably more vicious and selfish than the popular folk-hero image of them would allow. Admirers of the brothers stress their supposed Robin Hood characteristics, with the Krays alleged to have given away much of their ill-gotten wealth to the deserving poor of the East End; their respect for women; and as a force for order who engaged in only what were considered socially acceptable crimes such as theft while punishing those who engaged in what were considered socially unacceptable crimes such as rape. The East End at the time had its own informal rules, such as a deep distrust of the Metropolitan Police as exemplified by the popular saying "thou shalt not grass", which led to police complaining of a "wall of silence". Within the East End, where roguery was widely admired, Jenks and Lorentzen noted "symbolic heroes are elected through excess. The most audacious thefts, the most sadistic violence and an almost philosophical quest for glory in infamy are topmost in people's minds. An elision of style and brutality can emerge, as it did in the form of the Krays."

Conversely, the Krays were seen in other quarters as symbols of moral decay and evil, with the famous photographs of the brothers taken by David Bailey being viewed as "the phrenological archetypes of proletarian villainy". Jenks and Lorentzen wrote that the twins became symbols in the public mind of British organised crime itself, with the brothers being associated with "tales of excessive and gratuitous violence and to a time when London criminality appeared not only as organised as never before but also integrated into the Establishment and the vanguard of popular culture". Jenks and Lorentzen further maintained that the Krays' close association with the East End, an area viewed as a centre of "social disorganisation and moral decay", further contributed to the negative picture of the brothers.

Some critics of the Krays made xenophobic arguments that the twins were not of English stock but were instead the products of a mixture of Ashkenazi Jewish and Romany descent. In this context the Krays were presented as typical of the East End, which was viewed in certain quarters as an impoverished and lawless area that attracted many immigrants. Finally Jenks and Lorentzen argued that the rareness of identical twins made the brothers seem especially malevolent, giving them a freak-show image, since many found viewing two men who looked and sounded precisely the same to be disturbing and unnerving.

The closeness of the Krays made them seem sinister, as Lambrianou recalled in 1995: "You were never, ever on solid ground with them ... They played a little game of their own. There was an unspoken language; it was what they didn't say as much as what they did say. There's a myth that the Krays took care of their own, but I never saw it. The Krays were their own." Alongside this freak-show image were suggestions of what was viewed at the time as perverted sexuality. At a time when homosexuality was widely considered abnormal – especially in the underworld of the East End – Ronnie made a point of flaunting his relationships with men, which was considered to be quite shocking during the period. Reggie was ostensibly heterosexual but he had only one known relationship with a woman and was only briefly married; there were also rumours that he had had boyfriends as a teenager. The Krays were not asexual but the indeterminate nature of their sexuality contributed to their popular image of being in some vague way very perverse. The fact that the twins were successful gangsters while not subscribing to the standard heteronormative hard-men or lovable-rogue stereotypes associated with their criminal peers, while also rejecting the popular effeminate stereotype of gay men, led to a sense there was something unnatural about them. The sordid facts that were presented during the Krays' trial for murder led to their folk-hero image being eclipsed by a folk-villain image.

=== Lord Boothby and Tom Driberg ===
Tom Driberg, a Labour MP and gossip columnist for the Daily Express, was well acquainted with the Conservative peer Lord Boothby through dinner parties hosted by Lord Beaverbrook, the proprietor of the newspaper. Through his friend, the theatre director Joan Littlewood, Driberg had met Reginald Kray, who in turn introduced Boothby to Ronnie. Ronnie and Boothby entered into a homosexual relationship, in which the masochistic Boothby enjoyed being dominated by Ronnie, a sexual sadist. This aspect of Boothby's life was unknown to the general public, who knew him as a celebrity peer who frequently represented the Conservative Party on talk shows. For the purposes of blackmail, and the sense of power that came from associating with powerful men, Ronnie hosted parties for Boothby and other upper-class gay men where working class rent boys were made available for sex.

In July 1964, an exposé in the Sunday Mirror insinuated that Ronnie had begun a homosexual relationship with Boothby, at a time when sex between men was still a criminal offence in the United Kingdom. Police had leaked to the Sunday Mirror several photographs featuring Ronnie and Boothby posing together, along with photographs of them with Boothby's chauffeur Leslie Holt and Teddy Smith, a member of "the Firm" who was also the lover of Driberg. The photographs were not printed, but were alluded to in the headline "The Pictures We Must Not Print" along with the subtitle "Peer and Gangster: Yard Inquiry". Although no names were printed in the piece, the Krays threatened the journalists involved and Boothby threatened to sue the newspaper with the help of Labour leader Harold Wilson's solicitor, Arnold Goodman. In the face of this, the Sunday Mirror backed down, sacking its editor, printing an apology and paying Boothby £40,000 in an out-of-court settlement. Because of this, other newspapers were unwilling to expose the Krays' criminal activities. Decades later, Channel 4 established the truth of the allegations and broadcast a documentary on the subject called The Gangster and the Pervert Peer (2009).

Boothby called the £40,000 (over £1 million in 2024 values) he was awarded from the Sunday Mirror "tainted money", and though he professed to have donated the majority of the money to charity, it appears that the Krays took the bulk of the award. One of Boothby's first actions following the suit was to write a cheque for £5,000 to Ronnie. Ronnie had also launched a libel action of his own against Sunday Mirror columnist Cecil Harmsworth King for calling him a "homosexual thug" in one of his columns, but the judge dismissed the suit under the grounds that it was a "fair comment". Ronnie was furious about the dismissal, raging to a group of journalists: "Proves what I always said. One law for the fucking rich and another for the poor".

Police investigated the Krays on several occasions, but the twins' reputation for violence made witnesses afraid to testify. There was also a problem for both main political parties. The Conservatives were unwilling to press the police to end the Krays' power for fear that the Boothby connection would again be publicised, and Labour – having gained control of the House of Commons with an extremely thin majority and the prospect of a snap election in the very near future – did not want connections between Ronnie and Driberg to get into the public realm.

=== Alliance with the American Mafia ===
During the 1960s, the Kray twins formed an alliance with the Commission, the governing body of the American Mafia. The brothers were in contact with Meyer Lansky and Angelo Bruno, two U.S. gangsters who were looking to invest in London's nightclubs and casinos to engage in money laundering. Similar establishments in Havana had long served that purpose, but after the Cuban Revolution in 1959 led to their closure, the Mafia considered London as an alternative. The belief that the Krays were able to influence the British government by blackmailing political figures such as Boothby made them attractive as prospective partners. Both Lansky and Bruno were considered to be diplomatic figures by the standards of American organised crime, and were felt to be the most qualified to negotiate with the mercurial and irascible Krays.

The conduit between Lansky and the Krays was George Raft, a declining Hollywood actor whom the Krays idolised for his performance as the hitman Guino Rinaldo in the film Scarface (1932). With his career essentially over, Raft had moved to London in 1965 with the hope of finding roles in European films. Lansky had opened the Colony Sports Club in London and installed Raft as its nominal owner, partly to avoid the attention of British authorities and partly to gain the attention of gamblers. The club was marketed not so much at British gamblers but rather at older, wealthy American tourists. The Krays were hired to provide "protection" at the club, being paid £500 per week to provide thugs from "the Firm" to act as security. An attempted meeting between Ronnie, Lansky, and Bruno in New York was aborted when US immigration authorities denied him entry.

The following year, a Montreal branch of the Royal Bank of Canada was robbed of C$50,000 in bearer bonds. Similar robberies in Montreal resulted in a haul totaling C$1 million. The Montreal-based Cotroni crime family, the Canadian satellite of New York's Bonanno crime family, decided to sell the stolen bonds in Britain through the Krays. The twins sent over a corrupt businessman, Leslie "the Brain" Payne, to pick up the bonds for transport. Payne was able to cash the stolen bonds at a London brokerage house, netting a handsome profit for "the Firm". The success of the deal made the Krays the preferred British partners of the American Mafia, who used the twins a number of times afterwards in similar arrangements.

The business of redeeming the stolen bonds in London ultimately led to a break between Payne and the Krays. Payne charged that since he was the one taking all the risks to smuggle and redeem the bonds, he was entitled to a larger share of the profits. The Krays refused Payne's demand, which caused him to leave "the Firm". Payne did not contact the authorities, but the mere possibility that he might one day become a prosecution witness led the Krays to plot his murder. Payne, who fought in the Battle of Monte Cassino in 1944, ridiculed their threats of violence, which only made the twins angrier. Lacking the necessary connections with the City to keep redeeming the stolen bonds on their own, the Krays turned to Alan Bruce Cooper, a disreputable American businessman living in London.

=== George Cornell ===
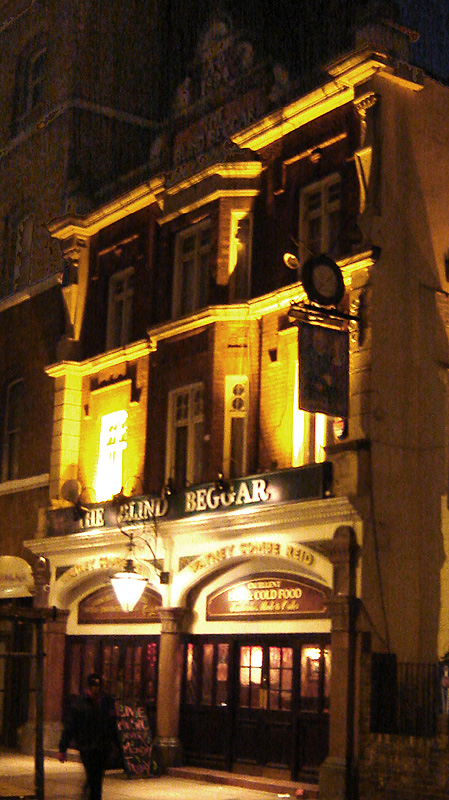
The Blind Beggar pub in 2005

Ronnie shot and killed George Cornell, a member of the Richardson Gang, at the Blind Beggar pub in Whitechapel on 9 March 1966. The day before, there had been a shoot-out at Mr. Smith's, a nightclub in Catford, involving the Richardsons and Richard Hart, an associate of "the Firm" who was shot dead. The shooting led to the arrest of nearly all the Richardson Gang. Cornell, by chance, was not present at Mr. Smith's and was not arrested.

Ronnie was drinking in another pub when he learned of Cornell's whereabouts. He went to the Blind Beggar with his driver, "Scotch Jack" John Dickson, and his assistant, Ian Barrie. Ronnie entered the pub with Barrie, walked straight to Cornell and shot him in the head in public view. Barrie, confused by what happened, fired five shots in the air warning onlookers not to report what had happened to police. Cornell died at 3:30 a.m. in hospital.

According to some sources, Ronnie killed Cornell because he referred to him as a "fat poof" (a derogatory term for a gay man) during a confrontation between the Krays and the Richardsons at the Astor Club on Christmas Day 1965. Richardson member Frankie Fraser was tried for the murder of Hart at Mr. Smith's, but was acquitted. Richardson member Ray "the Belgian" Cullinane testified that he saw Cornell kicking Hart. Witnesses would not co-operate with the police due to intimidation, and the trial ended inconclusively without pointing to any suspect in particular. In his 1988 memoir, Ronnie wrote: "I felt fucking marvellous. I have never felt so good, so bloody alive, before or since. Twenty years on and I can recall every second of the killing of George Cornell. I have replayed it in my mind millions of times".

The Krays' Mafia associates were unhappy about the Cornell murder, feeling that it was reckless on the part of Ronnie to shoot someone in public instead of assigning the task to a junior associate. With the help of Raft, Reggie was able to maintain the alliance, arguing "the Firm" was still the best business partners the Mafia could turn to in London. Raft and Reggie used the fact that none of the witnesses at the Blind Beggar were willing to testify against Ronnie as evidence of the degree of fear that the Krays inspired. Shortly afterwards, Raft was prevented from returning to the UK when a Home Office order listed him as an "undesirable", thereby costing the Krays their strongest ally within the Mafia.

=== Frank Mitchell ===
On 12 December 1966, the Krays helped Frank Mitchell, "the Mad Axeman", to escape from Dartmoor Prison. Ronnie had befriended Mitchell while they served time together in Wandsworth Prison. Mitchell felt that the authorities should review his case for parole, so Ronnie thought that he would be doing him a favour by getting him out of Dartmoor, highlighting his case in the media and forcing the authorities to act. Once Mitchell had escaped, the Krays held him at a friend's flat in Barking Road, East Ham. He was a large man with a mental disorder, and he was difficult to control. He disappeared, but the Krays were acquitted of his murder. Freddie Foreman, a friend of the Krays, claimed in his autobiography Respect that he shot Mitchell dead as a favour to the twins and disposed of his body at sea.

=== Jack "the Hat" McVitie ===
In October 1967, four months after the suicide of his wife Frances, Reggie was allegedly encouraged by his brother to kill Jack "the Hat" McVitie, a minor member of the Kray gang who had failed to fulfill a £1,000 contract, £500 of which had been paid to him in advance, to kill their former financial adviser, Leslie Payne. McVitie was lured to the home of Carol Skinner, known as 'Blonde Carol', a rented basement flat in Evering Road, Hackney, on the pretence of a party. Upon entering the premises, he saw Ronnie seated in the front room. Ronnie approached, letting loose a barrage of verbal abuse and cutting McVitie below his eye with a piece of broken glass. It is believed that an argument then broke out between the twins and McVitie. As the argument got more heated, Reggie pointed a handgun at McVitie's head and pulled the trigger twice, but the gun failed to discharge.

McVitie was then held in a bear hug by the twins' cousin, Ronnie Hart, and Reggie was handed a carving knife. He then stabbed McVitie in the face and stomach, driving the blade into his neck while twisting the knife, not stopping even as McVitie lay on the floor dying. Reggie had committed a very public murder, against someone who many members of the Firm felt did not deserve to die. In an interview in 2000, shortly after Reggie's death, Freddie Foreman revealed that McVitie had a reputation for leaving carnage behind him due to his habitual consumption of drugs and heavy drinking, and his having threatened to harm the twins and their family.

Tony and Chris Lambrianou and Ronnie Bender helped clear up the evidence of this crime, and attempted to assist in the disposal of the body. With McVitie's corpse being too big to fit in the boot of the car, it was wrapped in an eiderdown and put in the back seat. Tony Lambrianou drove the car with the body and Chris Lambrianou and Bender followed behind. Crossing the Blackwall tunnel, Chris lost Tony's car and spent up to 15 minutes looking around Rotherhithe. They found Tony, outside St Mary's Church, where he had run out of fuel, McVitie's body still inside the car. The body was left in the car and the three gangsters returned home. Bender then went on to phone Charlie Kray informing them that it had been dealt with. When the Krays heard where they had left McVitie's corpse, the twins were livid and desperately phoned Foreman, who was then running a pub in Southwark, to see if he could dispose of the body. With dawn breaking, Foreman found the car, broke into it and drove the body to Newhaven where, with the help of a trawlerman, the body was bound with chicken wire and dumped in the English Channel. This event started turning many people against the Krays, and some were prepared to testify to Scotland Yard as to what had happened, fearing that what happened to McVitie could easily happen to them.

=== Arrest, prosecution and imprisonment ===
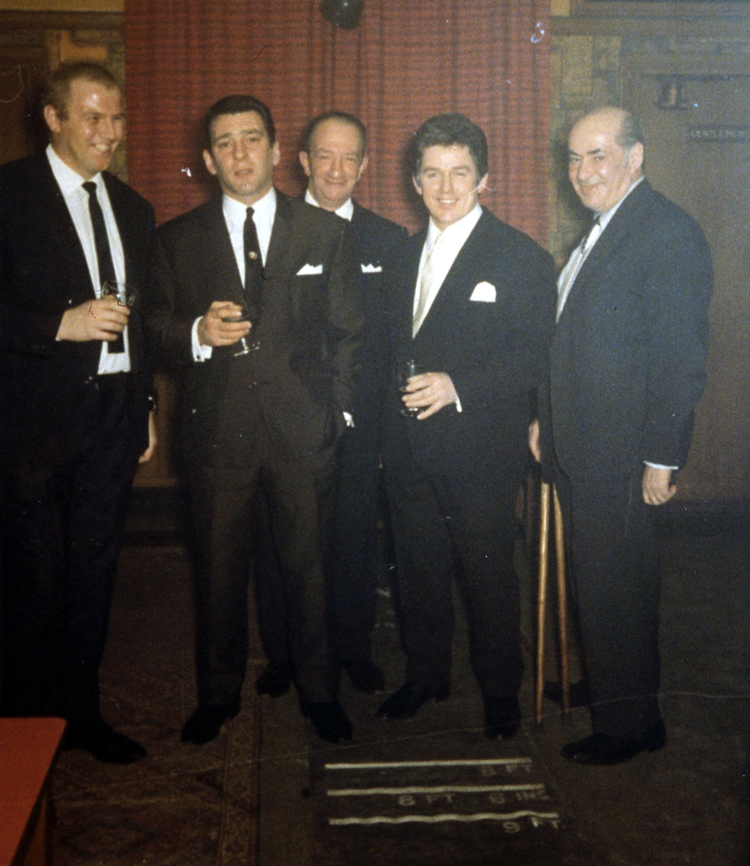
Photograph of Reginald Kray (second from left) taken in the months leading up to his trial in 1968. The evidence from this file and others resulted in him and his brother Ronald being sentenced to life imprisonment.

Detective Chief Superintendent Leonard "Nipper" Read of Scotland Yard was promoted to the Murder Squad and his first assignment was to bring down the Kray twins. During the first half of 1964, Read had been investigating their activities but publicity and official denials of Ron's relationship with Boothby made the evidence that he collected useless. Read went after the twins again in 1967 but frequently came up against the East End "wall of silence" which discouraged anyone from providing information to the police. They were represented in court by Nemone Lethbridge.

By the end of 1967 Read had built up enough evidence against the Krays. Early in 1968, the Krays employed Alan Bruce Cooper who sent Paul Elvey to Glasgow to buy explosives for a car bomb. Elvey was a radio engineer who put the pirate radio station Radio Sutch on the air in 1964, later renamed Radio City. After police detained him in Scotland, he confessed to being involved in three murder attempts. The evidence was weakened by Cooper, who claimed that he was an agent for the US Treasury Department investigating links between the American Mafia and the Kray gang. The attempted murders were his attempt to put the blame on the Krays.

Eventually Scotland Yard decided to arrest the Krays on the evidence already collected, in the hope that other witnesses would be forthcoming once the Krays were in custody. On 8 May 1968 the Krays and 15 members of the Firm were arrested. Exceptional measures were used to stop collusion between the accused. Nipper Read then secretly interviewed each of the arrested and offered each member of the Firm a deal if they testified against the others. Reggie Kray's right-hand man, Albert Donoghue, told the twins directly that he was not prepared to be cajoled into pleading guilty, to the anger of the twins. He then informed Read via his mother that he was ready to cooperate.

Ronnie Hart had initially not been arrested, and was not a name initially sought after by the police. With Donoghue's testimony, Hart was arrested. Offered the same terms as the others, Hart then told Read everything that had happened during McVitie's murder, although he did not know anything about what happened to the body. Although Read knew for certain that Ronnie Kray had murdered George Cornell in the Blind Beggar pub, no one had been prepared to testify against the twins out of fear. Upon finding out the twins intended to cajole him, 'Scotch Jack' Dickson also turned in everything he knew about Cornell's murder. Although not a witness to the murder he was an accessory, having driven Ronnie Kray and Ian Barrie to the pub. The police still needed a witness to the murder. Frank Mitchell's escape and disappearance were much harder to obtain evidence for, since the majority of those arrested were not involved with his planned escape and disappearance.

The twins' defence under their counsel John Platts-Mills consisted of flat denials of all charges and discrediting witnesses by pointing out their criminal past. Justice Melford Stevenson said: "In my view, society has earned a rest from your activities". The trial, which lasted from January to March 1969, was a media sensation. Such was the demand to attend the trial that a black market emerged for seats, with the price being £5 a day for a seat in the public gallery section of the courthouse. It was the longest murder hearing in the history of British criminal justice, during which Stevenson stated of the sentences: "I recommend [they] should not be less than thirty years". In March 1969, both were sentenced to life imprisonment (death having been abolished four years earlier as the mandatory sentence for murder), with a non-parole period of 30 years for the murders of Cornell and McVitie. Their brother Charlie was imprisoned for ten years for his part in the murders.

=== Later years ===
Ronnie and Reggie Kray were allowed, under a large police guard, to attend the funeral service of their mother Violet on 11 August 1982, following her death from cancer a week earlier. They were not allowed to attend her burial in the Kray family plot at Chingford Mount Cemetery. The funeral was attended by celebrities including Diana Dors and underworld figures known to the Krays. To avoid the publicity that had surrounded their mother's funeral, the twins did not ask for permission to attend their father's funeral in March 1983.

Ronnie Kray was a Category A prisoner, denied almost all liberties and not allowed to mix with other prisoners. He was eventually certified insane, his paranoid schizophrenia being tempered with constant medication: in 1979, he was committed, and lived the remainder of his life in Broadmoor Hospital in Crowthorne, Berkshire. Reggie Kray was locked up in Maidstone Prison for eight years (Category B). In 1997, he was transferred to Wayland Prison, a Category C prison, in Norfolk.

In 1985, officials at Broadmoor Hospital discovered a business card of Ronnie's that led to evidence that the twins, from separate institutions, were operating Krayleigh Enterprises (a "lucrative bodyguard and 'protection' business for Hollywood stars") together with their older brother Charlie Kray and an accomplice at large. Among their clients was Frank Sinatra, who hired 18 bodyguards from Krayleigh Enterprises on his visit to the 1985 Wimbledon Championships. Documents released under Freedom of Information laws revealed that although officials were concerned about this operation, they believed that there was no legal basis to shut it down.

== Personal lives ==
=== Ronnie ===
In his autobiography My Story (1993) and a comment to writer Robin McGibbon on The Kray Tapes, Ronnie stated: "I'm bisexual, not gay. Bisexual." In the 1960s, he also planned to marry a woman named Monica whom he had dated for nearly three years. He called her "the most beautiful woman he had ever seen." This is mentioned in Reggie's book Born Fighter. Furthermore, extracts are mentioned in Ronnie's own book, My Story; and in Kate Kray's books, Sorted; Murder, Madness and Marriage; and Free at Last.

Ronnie was arrested before he had the chance to marry Monica, and although she married his ex-boyfriend, 59 letters sent to her between May and December 1968 when he was imprisoned show that Ronnie still had feelings for her, and his love for her was very clear. He referred to her as "my little angel" and "my little doll". She also still had feelings for Ronnie. These letters were auctioned in 2010.

A letter Ronnie sent to his mother Violet from prison in 1968 also refers to Monica: "if they let me see Monica and put me with Reg, I could not ask for more." He went on to say, "Monica is the only girl I have liked in my life. She is a lovely little person as you know. When you see her, tell her I am in love with her more than ever." Ronnie subsequently married twice, marrying Elaine Mildener in 1985 at Broadmoor chapel (with Joey Pyle as best man), before the couple divorced in 1989, following which he married Kate Howard, whom he divorced in 1994. Kate Howard lived for a number of years in Headcorn, Kent, in Forge Lane.

In an interview with author John Pearson, Ronnie indicated he identified with the 19th-century soldier Charles George Gordon: "Gordon was like me, homosexual, and he met his death like a man. When it's time for me to go, I hope I do the same."

In his biography of the twins, The Profession of Violence, Pearson claims that Ronnie Kray admitted that he and Reggie discovered they were both gay in their adolescence, and would often have sex together, an activity which continued into their later life.

=== Reggie ===
Reggie married Frances Shea in 1965. She died by suicide in 1967. Bradley Allardyce, an inmate, claims that Reggie confessed to him that Ronnie had murdered Frances. In 1997, Reggie married Roberta Jones, whom he met while still in prison. She was helping to publicise a film she was making about Ronnie, who had died in the hospital two years earlier.

== Controversies ==
There was a long-running campaign, with some minor celebrity support, to have the twins released from prison, but successive Home Secretaries vetoed the idea, largely on the grounds that both Krays' prison records were marred by violence towards other inmates. The campaign gathered momentum after the release of a film based on their lives called The Krays (1990). Produced by Ray Burdis, it starred Spandau Ballet brothers Martin and Gary Kemp, who played the roles of Reggie and Ronnie respectively. Ronnie, Reggie and Charlie Kray received £255,000 for the film.

Reggie wrote: "I seem to have walked a double path most of my life. Perhaps an extra step in one of those directions might have seen me celebrated rather than notorious." Others point to Reggie's violent prison record when he was being detained separately from Ronnie and argue that in reality, the twins' temperaments were little different.

Reggie's marriage to Frances Shea (1943–1967) in 1965 had lasted for eight months when she left, although the marriage was never formally dissolved. An inquest came to the conclusion that she had committed suicide, but in 2002, an ex-lover of Reggie Kray's came forward to allege that Frances was murdered by a jealous Ronnie. Bradley Allardyce spent three years in Maidstone Prison with Reggie and explained, "I was sitting in my cell with Reg and it was one of those nights where we turned the lights down low and put some nice music on and sometimes he would reminisce. He would get really deep and open up to me. He suddenly broke down and said 'I'm going to tell you something I've only ever told two people and something I've carried around with me' – something that had been a black hole since the day he found out. He put his head on my shoulder and told me Ronnie killed Frances. He told Reggie what he had done two days after."

A television documentary, The Gangster and the Pervert Peer (2009), claimed that Ronnie Kray was a rapist of men. The programme also detailed his relationship with Conservative peer Lord Boothby, as well as a Daily Mirror investigation into Lord Boothby's dealings with the Kray brothers.

== The Kray legend ==
Jenks and Lorentzen argued that the Krays have entered the realm of a popular myth. The definition of 'myth' used by Jenks and Lorentzen is that formulated by Peter Burke in a 1989 essay "History as a Social Memory", where he defined a 'myth' as follows: "I am incidentally, using that slippery term 'myth' not in the positivist sense of 'inaccurate history', but in the richer, more positive sense of a story with symbolic meanings, made up of stereotyped incidents and involving characters who are larger than life, whether they are heroes or villains". Jenks and Lorentzen argued the Krays have become the embodiment of "a particular version of East End history" and as a symbol of a "dark criminal past" associated with the East End.

The relative rarity of identical twins made the Krays stand out as there were numerous other gangster brother teams in the East End in the 1950s–1960s such as the Richardson brothers, the Nash brothers, the Dixon brothers, the Wood brothers, the Malone brothers, the Webb brothers and the Lambrianou brothers, but only the Krays live on in popular memory with the rest forgotten. The fame/infamy of the Krays is such that as Jenks and Lorentzen noted that even today a "vast number" of East Enders "continue to claim an association with the Twins or their family (often despite impossible biographical or temporal discrepancies)". Jenks and Lorentzen argued the Krays have become a 'myth' because in the popular memory the Krays have "became a distillation of the violence, the horror, and the misery that the cultural compass of the East End has meant to the conventional moral order".

The American scholar Homer Pettey noted that there have been more films made about the Krays than other British gangsters. Pettey argued that popularity of the Krays as cinematic subjects reflected the image of the twins as the embodiment of the "dark sides of British national identity", as symbols of a streak of national perversity, ferocity and cruelty that stands in marked contrast to the normal positive images of the national identity of Britain presented in films. Pettey wrote "To extrapolate from their careers elements of British national identity, however, is not so far-fetched as it might seem. The Kray twins not only cultivated these popular cultural icons of their era, but they also wanted to become media icons ... These sadistic twins initiated and accepted media practices that re-presented, re-mythologized and re-contextualized their lives". However, the fact that the Krays' criminal career came to an end with their convictions in 1969 allows their story, however unsavoury and unpleasant it might be, to be presented on a reassuring note as the forces of law and order finally did triumph.

Part of the appeal of the legend of the Krays is that their story ended with the "dark side" of life that they represented being vanquished. Pettey wrote: "In general, twins' lives fascinate because of their rarity in culture; their singularity forms the stuff of foundational myths, and lends itself to speculations about repetition, dualities and paradoxes. For Ron and Reggie Kray, local East End and London media lore hinted at two personalities, the gangster and the gentleman, the schizophrenic sadist and the clear-headed businessman, and the promiscuous homosexual and the monogamous married man."

== Deaths ==
Ronnie suffered a heart attack at Broadmoor Hospital on 15 March 1995, and died two days later at the age of 61 at Wexham Park Hospital in Slough, Berkshire. Reggie was allowed out of prison in handcuffs to attend the funeral.

Charlie Kray, Ronnie and Reggie's older brother, was released from prison in 1975, after serving seven years of his 10-year sentence for his role in their gangland crimes. Charlie was sentenced to 12 years' imprisonment in 1997 for conspiracy to smuggle cocaine in an undercover drug sting. He died in prison of natural causes on 4 April 2000, aged 72, with Reggie allowed out of prison to attend his older brother's funeral.

During his incarceration, Reggie Kray became a born-again Christian. He was diagnosed with terminal bladder cancer in 2000. He was released from Wayland Prison on 26 August 2000 on compassionate grounds, at the discretion of Home Secretary Jack Straw. Reggie died from cancer, aged 66, on 1 October 2000. The final weeks of his life were spent with his wife of three years, Roberta, in a suite at the Townhouse Hotel at Norwich, after he left the Norfolk and Norwich Hospital on 22 September 2000. Ten days after his death, he was buried beside his brother Ronnie in Chingford Mount Cemetery. During the funeral, crowds of thousands lined up to applaud.

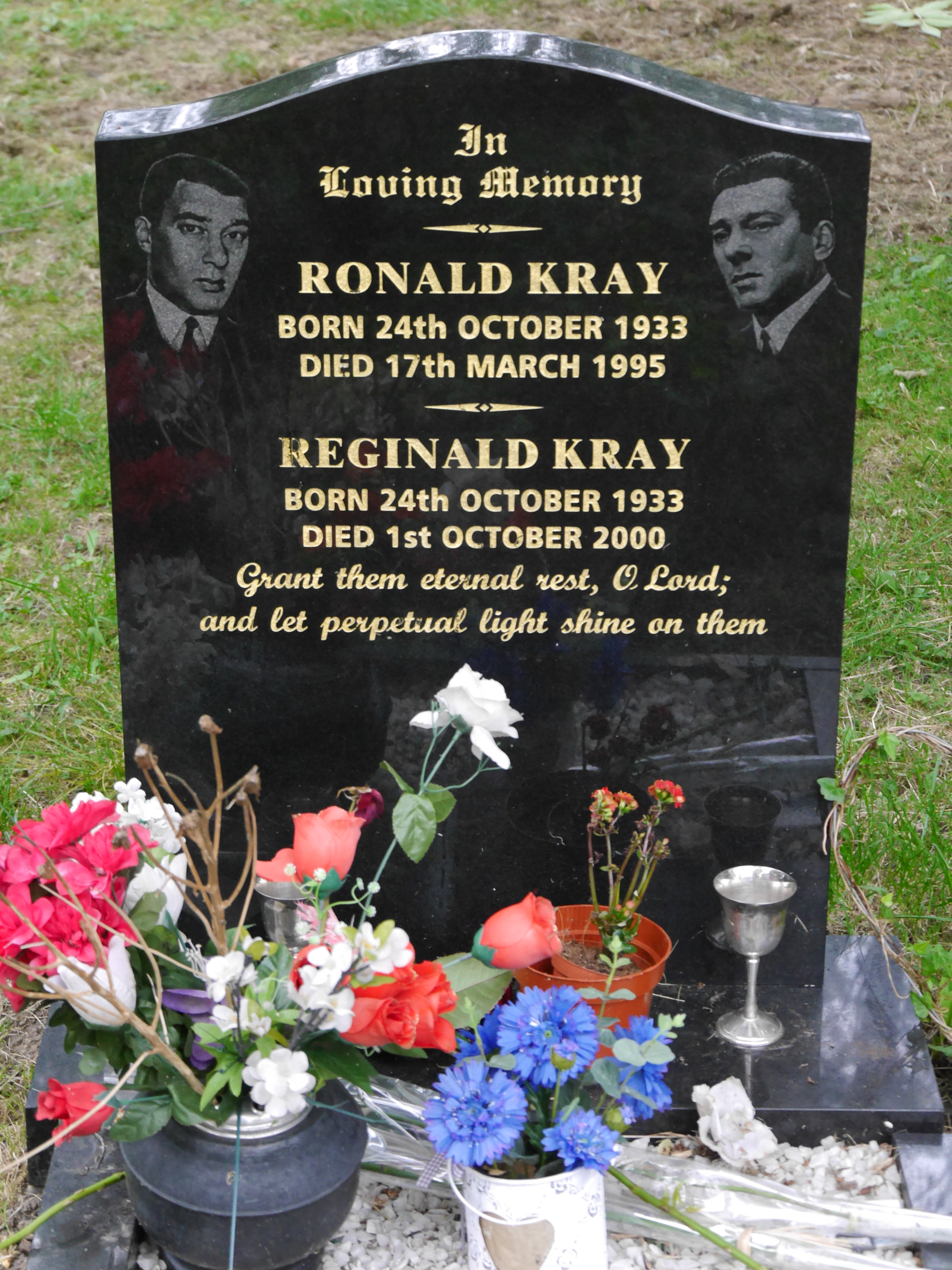
Ronnie and Reggie Kray's grave, Chingford

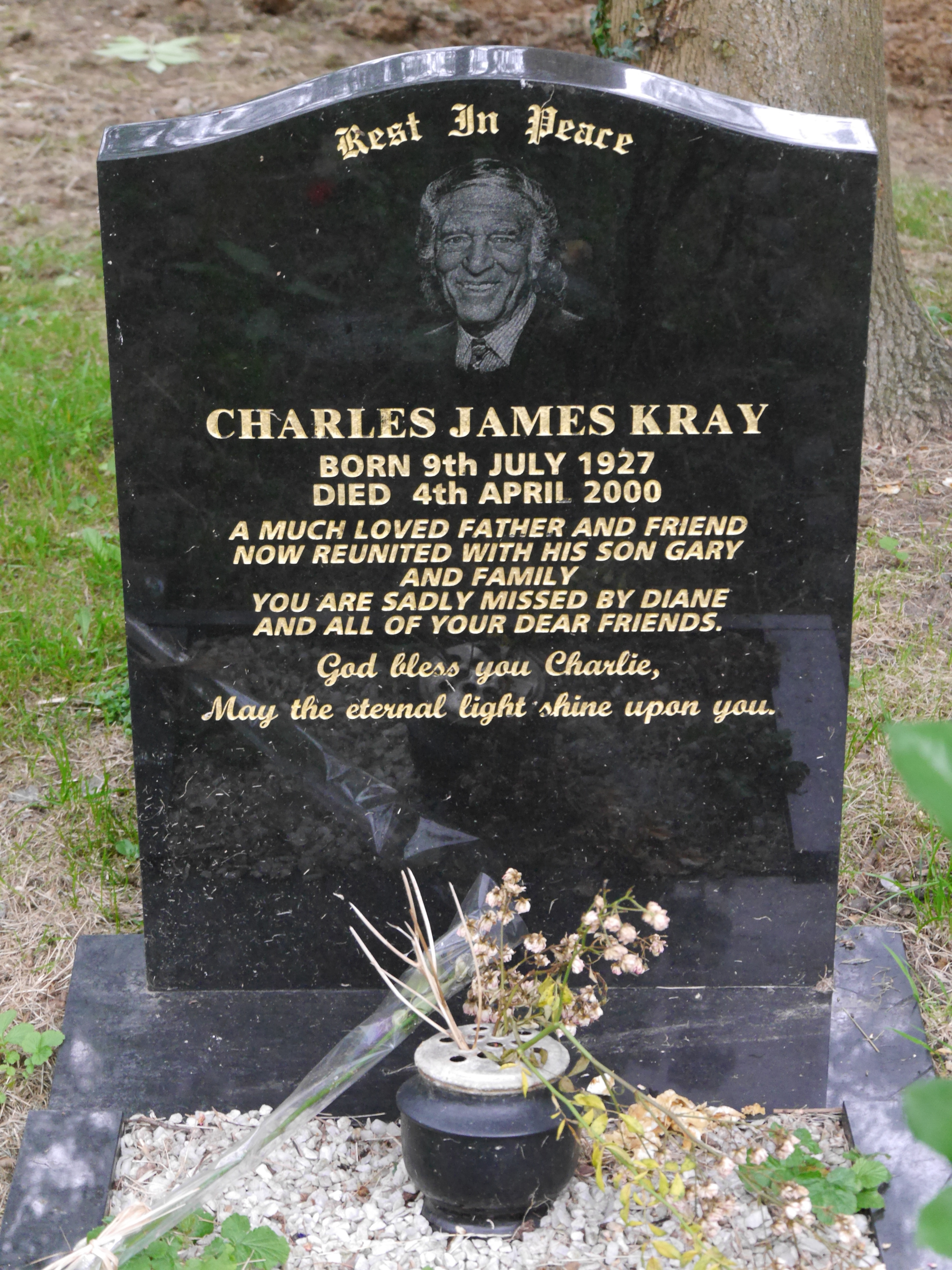
Charlie Kray's grave, Chingford

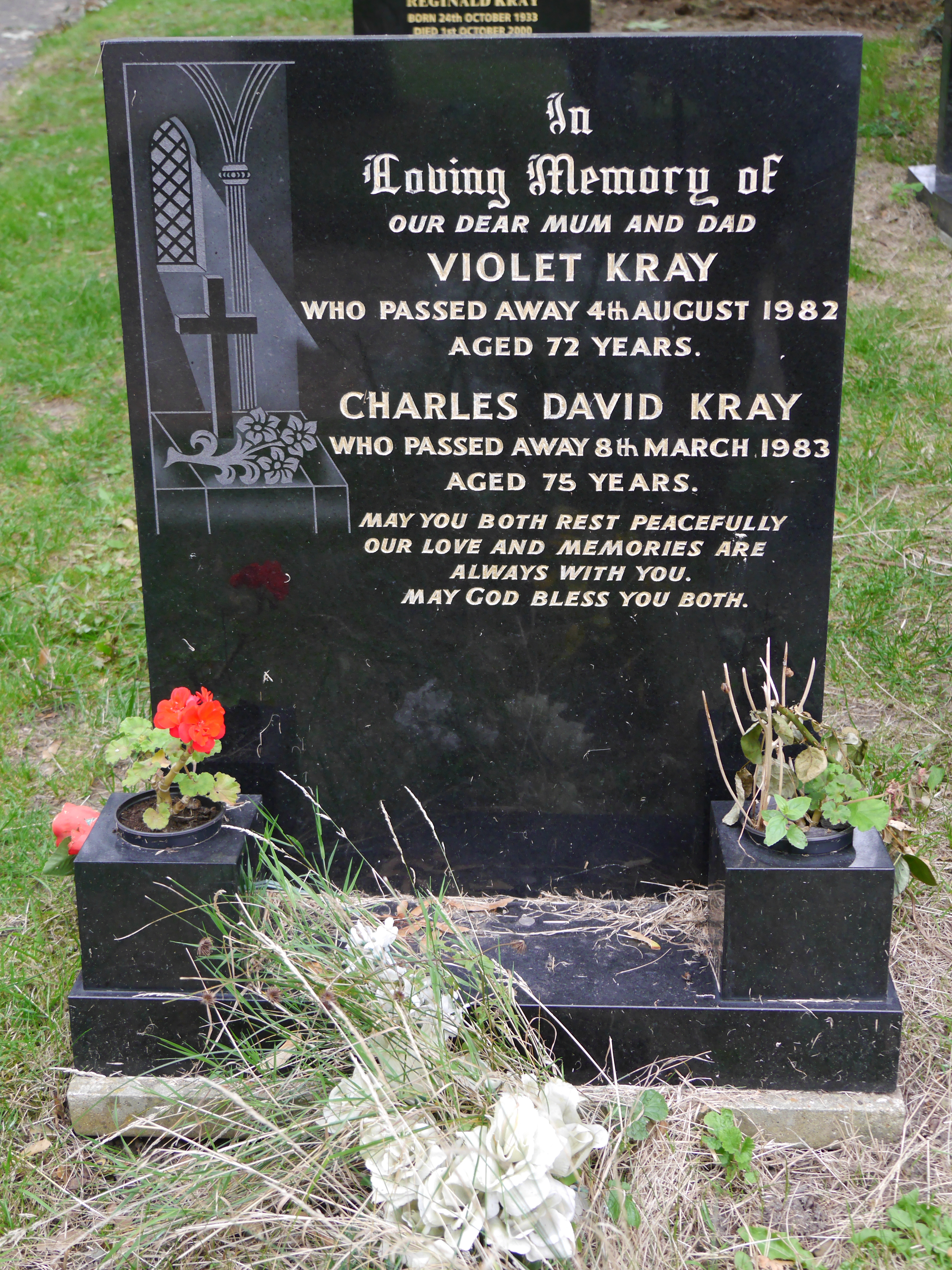
The grave of Violet and Charles Kray, parents of Charlie and of the Kray twins, Chingford

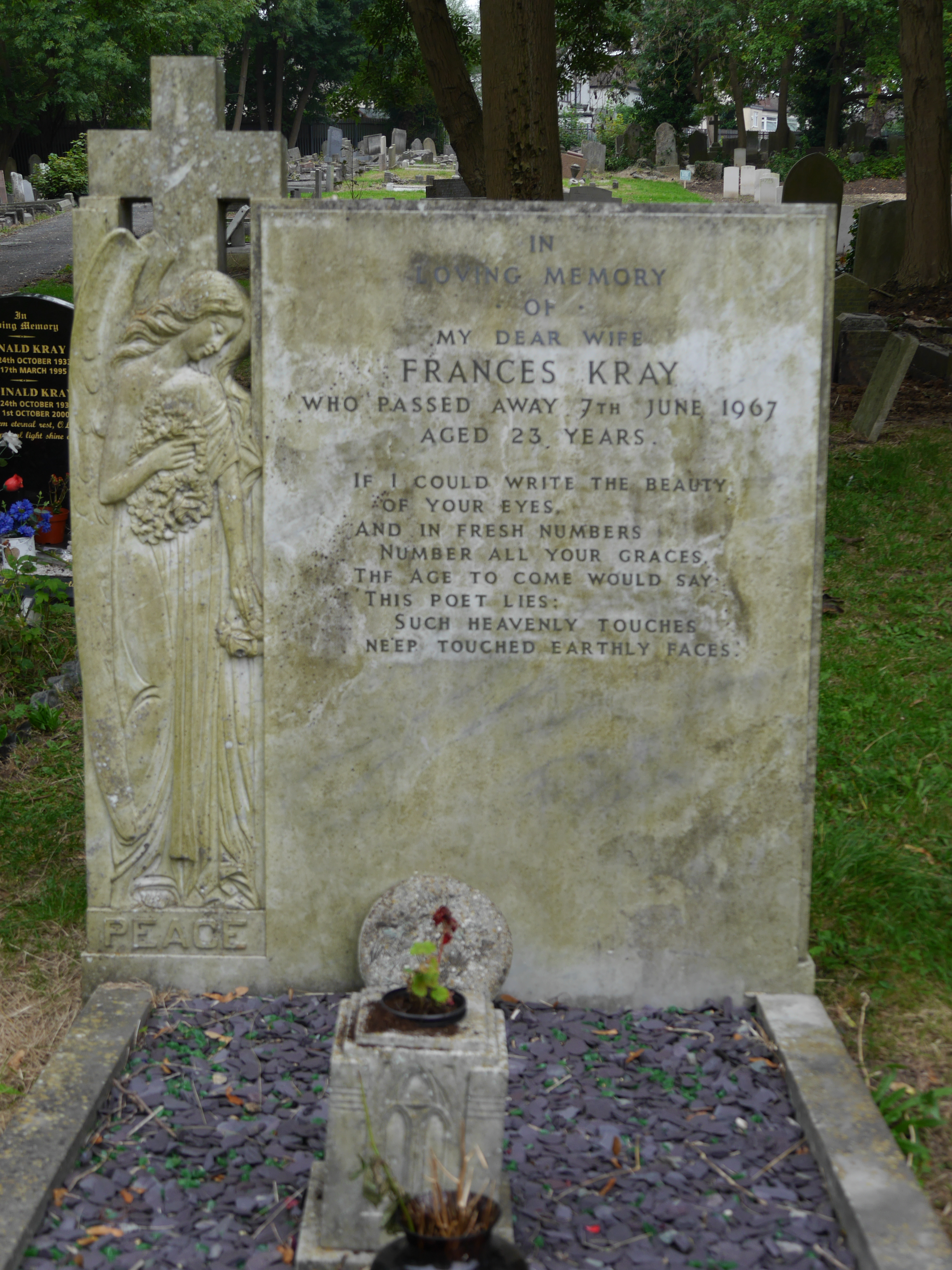
The grave of Frances Kray, Reggie's wife, Chingford

== Media ==
The Kray twins have seeded an extensive bibliography, leading to many autobiographical accounts, biographical reconstructions, commentaries, analysis, fiction and speculation.

=== Film and TV ===
- Piranha Brothers, a 1970 Monty Python sketch, was inspired by the Krays.
- The Krays (1990), a film biopic starring musicians Gary and his real life brother Martin Kemp of Spandau Ballet, as Ronnie and Reggie respectively.
- Legend (2015), a biopic starring Tom Hardy as both Ronnie and Reggie
- The Rise of the Krays (2015), a low budget film starring Simon Cotton as Ronnie and Kevin Leslie as Reggie
- The Fall of the Krays (2016), a low budget sequel to the earlier 2015 film, again starring Simon Cotton as Ronnie and Kevin Leslie as Reggie
- The Krays: Dead Man Walking (2018) focused on Frank Mitchell's escape from prison and death.
- Code of Silence (2021), focusing on Leonard "Nipper" Read's final effort to get the Kray brothers convicted, starring Ronan Summers as both Ronnie and Reggie.
- The Krays: New Blood, a currently unreleased sequel to the 2018 film, this time focused on Frances Shea's death.

In addition to films explicitly about the twins, James Fox met Ronnie whilst the twins were held at HM Prison Brixton as part of his research for his role in the 1970 film Performance, and Richard Burton visited Ronnie at Broadmoor as part of his preparation for his role as a violent gangster in the 1971 film Villain.

=== Literature ===
- Pearson, John (1972). The Profession of Violence: The Rise and Fall of the Kray Twins. New York: Saturday Review Press. ISBN 9780841502505. Biography.
- Kray, Charles (1976). Me and my Brothers. Everest Publishing. ISBN 0905018141. Autobiography.
- Kray, Reggie; Kray, Ronnie (1988). Our Story. Sidgwick & Jackson. ISBN 0283995254. Autobiography.
- Kray, Reggie (1990). Born Fighter. Random House. ISBN 0099878100. Autobiography.
- Kray, Ronnie (1993). My Story. Pan. ISBN 033033507-3. Autobiography.
- Kray, Reggie (2000). A Way of Life: Over Thirty Years of Blood, Sweat and Tears. Pan Macmillan. ISBN 0330485113. Autobiography.

=== Theatre ===
Two plays were produced in the 1970s that were based on thinly veiled versions of the Krays:

- Alpha Alpha, by Howard Barker in 1972
- England England, a musical by Snoo Wilson with music by Kevin Coyne and directed by Dusty Hughes in 1977, starring Bob Hoskins and Brian Hall in the lead roles.

=== Music ===
- The song "Last of the Famous International Playboys" (1989) by English musician Morrissey was inspired by what he saw as media glamourisation of the Krays, and refers to both brothers by name in the lyrics. Reggie Kray mentioned the song in his autobiography, stating: "I liked the tune, but the lyrics in their entirety were lacking a little." Morrissey responded: "I can't get away from critics."

== Books and articles ==
- Hebdige, Dick (1974). The Kray Twins: A Study of a System of Closure. Birmingham: University of Birmingham Press.
- Jenks, Chris; Lorentzen, Justin (2004). "The Kray Fascination". In Chris Jenks (ed.). Urban Culture Critical Critical Concepts in Literary and Cultural Studies Volume 4. London: Routledge. pp. 3–24. ISBN 9780415304993.
- Pearson, John (2010). Notorious The Immortal Legend of the Kray Twins. New York: Random House. ISBN 9781409099963.
- Penfold-Mounce, Ruth (2010). Celebrity Culture and Crime The Joy of Transgression. London: Palgrave Macmillan. ISBN 9780230248304.
- Pettey, Homer (2018). "The Kray Twins and Biographical Media". In R. Barton Palmer, Homer B. Pettey (ed.). Rule, Britannia! The Biopic and British National Identity. New York: State University of New York Press. pp. 1–22. ISBN 9781438471112.
- Raban, Jonathan (2004). "The Emporium of Styles". In Chris Jenks (ed.). Urban Culture Critical Concepts in Literary and Cultural Studies Volume 1. London: Routledge. pp. 229–248. ISBN 9780415304979.
