= Jack McVitie =

English criminal (1932–1967)

- Born: Jack Dennis McVitie; 19 April 1932; Battersea, London, England
- Died: 29 October 1967 (aged 35); Clapton, Hackney, London, England
- Cause of death: Stabbed to death by Reggie Kray
- Other name: "Jack the Hat"
- Spouse: Marie Marney (m. 1950)
- Children: 1

Jack Dennis McVitie (19 April 1932 – 29 October 1967), best known as Jack the Hat, was an English criminal from London during the 1950s and 1960s. He had acted as an enforcer and hitman for the Kray twins before being murdered by Reggie Kray in 1967.

His murder is famous for having triggered the imprisonment and downfall of the Krays.

== Life ==
Jack McVitie was born in 1932, the son of a labourer and charwoman. McVitie married Marie Marney in Surrey in 1950. He fathered one son named Tony. The nickname "the Hat" is said to be because of a trilby hat that he wore to cover up his hair loss.

== Criminal history ==
McVitie's first criminal conviction was in October 1946, when he was convicted of stealing a watch and cigarettes at Buntingford Juvenile Court. Associates from his early career described him as affable with flashes of cruelty.

A known drug trafficker by the 1960s, he had been an associate of the Kray twins for some time and, although never a permanent member of The Firm, was regularly employed to commit various crimes on their behalf. He was valued by them for his ability to intimidate bookmakers, drinking club owners and rivals. He was paid in cash, drugs and the prestige of a seat at their night club tables.

In 1967, Ronnie Kray paid McVitie £500 in advance to kill ex-friend and business partner Leslie Payne, promising he would give another £500 when the job was finished, amid fears that Payne was about to inform the police of his criminal activities. McVitie, with his friend Billy Exley driving, set off to shoot Payne, but were unsuccessful.

By this time Exley suffered from heart trouble and McVitie was heavily dependent on drugs. Arriving at Payne's home in Tulse Hill, McVitie hammered loudly on the front door, which luckily for Payne was opened by his wife. "He's not in," she said. "That's all right," said McVitie and he and Exley left. Instead of repaying the money, McVitie kept it. This incident led, in part, to McVitie's death.

== Death ==
With McVitie's drink and drug use growing ever greater, he started going around the pubs of London taunting the Krays and saying that he was going to kill them, which both twins soon heard about. Joey Pyle, a friend of McVitie since childhood, contacted him half a dozen times to tell him to stop: "If you carry on like this," he told him, "one day you're gonna get it".

On 29 October 1967, McVitie was lured to a party at the home of Carol Skinner at 97 Evering Road, Hackney. Also invited were several of his underworld associates and their families. The Krays had secretly arrived at the party first and had spent an hour clearing away guests. A drunk McVitie arrived just before midnight. Reggie Kray's initial plan to shoot McVitie upon entry failed when his gun jammed. McVitie tried to escape through a window, but he was pulled back in by the legs. Reggie Kray stabbed McVitie repeatedly in the face, chest and stomach as part of a brief but violent struggle. The twins quickly fled the scene and McVitie's body, which could not fit in the car boot was wrapped in an eiderdown, and then left outside St Mary's Church, Rotherhithe by Tony and Chris Lambrianou, Keith Askem and Ronnie Bender, who were minor members of the Firm.

When the Krays discovered the whereabouts of the corpse, they ordered it to be immediately moved, probably because of the proximity of friend and associate Freddie Foreman. The body was never recovered, although in an interview in 2000 (which featured Reggie Kray giving a frank account of the activity of the Firm 12 days before his death) Foreman admitted to throwing McVitie's body from a boat into the sea at Newhaven, Sussex. "Jack got silly," reflected Pyle. "He knew he was going to get it. At the end of the day I can't blame the Twins for what they did. If someone goes around saying they are going to kill you, then you don't have a lot of choice – you have to do them first. But Jack should never have died the way he did. He died like a fucking rat."

== Justice ==
Following McVitie's murder, the Krays and several other members of their gang were finally arrested by the Scotland Yard police officers who had been watching their exploits for years. At the Old Bailey on 4 March 1969, both were found guilty of murder and sentenced to life imprisonment with a recommendation that they should each serve a minimum of 30 years. Ronnie's murder conviction was for the murder of a rival gangster, George Cornell, whom he shot dead in March 1966.

The jury took 6 hours and 55 minutes to reach their unanimous verdict. Never before at the Old Bailey had such a long and expensive trial taken place. The Krays' elder brother Charlie, together with Freddie Foreman (who helped move the body) and Cornelius Whitehead, were all found guilty of being accessories to McVitie's murder.

The glamour associated with the Krays grew with both writing best-selling books about their lives while in prison. In 1990, a full-length biographical film entitled The Krays was released (featuring real-life brothers Martin and Gary Kemp as the Kray twins). Jack McVitie was portrayed by actor Tom Bell in this film before also featuring in the 2004 film Charlie, this time depicted by Marius Swift. In the 2015 film about the Krays, Legend, starring Tom Hardy as both Kray brothers, McVitie is played by Sam Spruell.

== See also ==
- Lists of solved missing person cases

== Sources ==
- DeVito, Carlo. The Encyclopedia of International Organized Crime. New York: Facts on File Inc., 2005; ISBN 0-8160-4848-7
