= Richardson Gang =

London-based English crime gang

- Founded by: Charles Richardson
- Founding location: London, United Kingdom
- Years active: 1950s–1960s
- Territory: South London
- Ethnicity: Mainly English
- Criminal activities: Narcotics; Extortion; Money laundering; Torture; Robbery; Assault
- Rivals: Kray Firm

The Richardson Gang was an English crime gang based in South London, in the 1960s. Also known as the "Torture Gang", they had a reputation as some of London's most sadistic gangsters. Their alleged specialties included pulling teeth out using pliers, cutting off toes using bolt cutters and nailing victims to floors using 6-inch nails.

== Prominent members ==
=== Charlie and Eddie Richardson ===
Charles William "Charlie" Richardson (18 January 1934 – 19 September 2012) was born in Brentford, Middlesex to Eileen Elizabeth Mary (née Allen) and Charles Frederick Richardson, who had married the previous year in Camberwell, South London. The family soon moved back to Camberwell, where younger brother, Edward G. "Eddie" Richardson (21 January 1936 – 14 August 2026), was born followed by youngest sibling, Elaine (born 1940). Charlie and Eddie turned to a life of crime after their father deserted the family.

=== George Cornell ===
An important member of the Richardson gang was George Cornell. Cornell was heavily involved in drug dealing, in purple hearts and dexys, uppers, downers and cannabis. He was also involved in pornography and may have been associated with criminal Jimmy Humphreys, whose arrest led to the exposure of corrupt police officials in 1971, including Commander Ken Drury of the Flying Squad.

Humphreys was under investigation by another squad, and Drury refused to acknowledge his association with Humphreys even after Drury reportedly received a "Wish you were here" holiday postcard from him. Cornell was originally a member of an East End gang called "The Watney Streeters" and later became involved with the Krays. However, he changed sides around 1964 and allied himself with the Richardsons. Cornell was unstable and unpredictable, and nearly caused an all-out war between the two gangs before his death when Ronnie Kray shot and killed him in 1966.

=== "Mad" Frankie Fraser ===
Frankie Fraser teamed up with the Richardson gang in the early 1960s. His criminal career began at age 13 with theft.

During World War II his crimes escalated, including shopbreaking and desertion. He was a known associate of gangster Billy Hill throughout the 1950s. After joining the Richardsons, he served as their enforcer. Reportedly, Fraser's favourite brand of punishment was extracting teeth with pliers.

Over his long criminal career, Fraser spent 40–42 years in prison. He died in 2014 of complications from surgery.

=== Other members ===
Other members of the gang included the hitman Jimmy Moody, Derek "Del" Peterman, Roy Hall (who operated the electric generator), Bartholomew "Barry" Harris (a getaway driver), Albert Longman, Ron Lawrence (a getaway driver and enforcer), Harry Rawlins, Alan Morse/Rigby, Tony Lawrence,Frank Bailey, Harry Banks, Tommy Clark, Ron "Ronnie" Large, James Kemmery, and Mick O'Brien.

== Methods ==
On one occasion, a collector of "pensions" (protection money from publicans and others), was punished after being twice warned by the Richardsons for pocketing the money and spending it at Catford dog track. He was nailed to the floor of a warehouse near Tower Bridge for nearly two days, during which time gang members (for example, driver Harry Beard) frequently urinated on him.

== Feud with the Krays ==
The Richardson gang and the Kray twins were engaged in a turf war in the mid-to-late 1960s. Charlie Richardson and George Cornell had first met the Krays while in Shepton Mallet Prison.

Tensions came to a head in 1965–66. During a Christmas party at the Astor Club in December 1965, Cornell called Ronnie Kray a "fat poof" and a fight ensued.

On 7 or 8 March 1966, Richard Hart, one of the Krays' associates, was shot dead, intentionally or otherwise, during a brawl involving the Richardson Gang at Mr Smith's Club in Rushey Green, Catford. Mr Smith's was owned by Manchester-based businessmen Dougie Flood (a club/hotel/leisure business owner and alleged member of the Quality Street Gang) and Bill Benny. They had asked Eddie Richardson and Frankie Fraser to "protect" the club in exchange for gaming machines being placed there. That night members of the Richardson gang were drinking at Mr Smith's. Members of another South London gang led by Billy Hayward were present that night, including Peter Hennessey.

On the night in question, both gangs were "drinking and chatting quite happily". That was according to a guest who was with his girlfriend in the bar but was suddenly ushered out of the club soon after midnight. At around 1.00am, Eddie Richardson told Peter Hennessey and the others to "drink up" and leave. In response, Hennessey called Eddie Richardson a "half-baked fucking ponce" and shouted that he could "take you any fucking time you like". Richardson and Hennessey began exchanging blows. Other fistfights had started when gun shots rang out.

Several years after the incident, an unnamed gangster who was in the club at the time said that it was "like Dodge City". It was said that Hart was shot on or near the bottom of the stairs as he was making his getaway. For many years Fraser was held responsible for murdering Hart. Fraser always vehemently denied it. It is alleged that Billy Gardner confronted Fraser, asking, "You tooled up, Frank?", and shot Fraser through the thigh with a .38 pistol. Eddie Richardson, Frankie Fraser and others ended up in Lewisham Hospital. They denied all knowledge of the incident when questioned by police. Hennessey sustained a bayonet wound to his scalp. Hennessey, Gardner and others sought help from Freddie Foreman after the altercation.

Although most of the gang were arrested, some were put up by Foreman until things had blown over. Fraser had been officially declared insane at least twice previously. It has been suggested though that Fraser acquired his "Mad Frankie" sobriquet from this incident. Apparently, a Hayward associate named Henry Botton saw Fraser kicking Hart in the head and shouted, "You're fucking mad, Frank. You're fucking bonkers." The whole incident at Mr Smith's caused the arrest of nearly all of the Richardson gang.

Fallout continued the next day. A member of the Richardson gang, Jimmy Andrews, was injured in the affray and went for treatment at the Royal London Hospital in Whitechapel the day after. This was where George Cornell, one of the few members of the Richardson gang who were not in jail or hospital, and an old friend of Andrews, went to visit him. That evening at about 8:30 Cornell was inside The Blind Beggar public house sited about 300m from the hospital entrance. Ronnie Kray arrived with two associates and shot Cornell through the head at close range, killing him. One of several local businessmen, in the saloon bar at the time, said he heard Cornell's last words: "Well, look what the dog's brought in."

== "Torture Trial" ==
=== Basis ===
The downfall of the Richardsons began because of mounting testimony to the police. The incident at Mr Smith's and the later arrests helped seal their fate.

In July 1965, one of the gang's victims reported the crime to the police. The victim told the tale of being severely beaten and bruised after being found guilty of disloyalty by a kangaroo court; he then had to mop up his own blood using his own underpants.

A member of the Richardson gang, Johnny Bradbury, turned Queen's Evidence. Bradbury was convicted of murdering a business associate named Waldeck in South Africa, allegedly on orders from Charlie Richardson. When sentenced to hang, Bradbury offered to inform on the Richardson gang in exchange for a pardon and immunity. This was arranged by a special squad of the CID, led by Inspector Gerald MacArthur. (Note: Under MacArthur's leadership, the Hertfordshire force was investigating the Richardsons because the Home Office could not trust the Metropolitan Police, many of whom were in the pay of the Richardsons and other London gangs. By 1966, the Metropolitan Police was allegedly so corrupt that the then Home Secretary, Roy Jenkins, was considering replacing up to 70% of the CID and other specialist branches with CID from Manchester, Kent, Devon & Cornwall and Birmingham. When Robert Mark became Police Commissioner in 1972, he succeeded Sir John Waldron. More than 400 CID officers and 300 uniformed police officers were "retired" early. Not long after Mark's appointment, Drury, Wally Virgo, Head of the Serious Crimes Squad, and other senior officers were sent to prison for corruption.)

Other victims of the Richardsons were granted immunity from prosecution in other crimes if they turned Queen's Evidence. With the assistance of the Home Office, which arranged different identities and passports, several witnesses fled the country immediately after the trial. A few went to South Africa and others to Spain or Mallorca; many did not return to the United Kingdom for a considerable time.

=== Arrests and trial ===
Charlie Richardson was arrested for grievous bodily harm on 30 July 1966, the World Cup final day. Eddie Richardson was sent to prison for five years for affray. There were also stories of Charlie being connected to the South African Bureau of State Security and an attempt to tap then-Prime Minister Harold Wilson's telephone. In July 1966, police arrested the remaining members of the Richardson gang following a series of raids in South London.

Accurately dubbed as to allegations, the "Torture Trial" convened at the Old Bailey at the beginning of April 1967. The Richardsons were found guilty of fraud, extortion, assault and grievous bodily harm. Charlie Richardson was sentenced to 25 years in prison, and Eddie had ten years added to his existing sentence. Charlie Richardson was not freed until July 1984.

== Aftermath ==
In 1980, after many attempts to obtain release, Charlie Richardson escaped from an open prison. He went "on the trot" for almost a year, even dressing as Santa Claus and giving out presents to children to publicise his requests for release. He openly drank with friends and old associates (including police officers) at several pubs on the Old Kent Road before fleeing to Paris, where he gave an interview to a journalist.

He was arrested with five other men in Earl's Court on suspicion of possession of drugs, having just been seen coming out of a sex shop which was known to be controlled by the Richardson family. His identity only came to light once arrested and in police custody in Kensington when his probation officer contacted the police, having been informed by other gang members that he had been arrested. In 1983, Charlie was able to go on day release to help the handicapped and was allowed to spend a weekend with his family. Charlie was finally released in July 1984.

In 1990, Eddie Richardson was sentenced to 35 years after being convicted of involvement in a £70 million cocaine and cannabis heist. He was released after 12 years, bringing his total number of years served to 23.

The brothers fell out badly after Eddie accused Charlie of fraudulent business deals during Eddie's time in prison.

Charlie Richardson died of peritonitis in September 2012. A heavy smoker, he had suffered from emphysema for several years.

=== White Horse public house ===
There are pictures of the Richardson gang in the White Horse pub (now a community run venture) in Upton, Norfolk. The gang chose this as their rural "bolt hole" whenever they were under investigation in London. It is alleged that a lot of local houses were built with Richardson gang money, all cash-in-hand, and then sold legitimately, thereby laundering the gang's ill-gotten gains.
