= Chingford Mount Cemetery =

Cemetery in Waltham Forest, Greater London

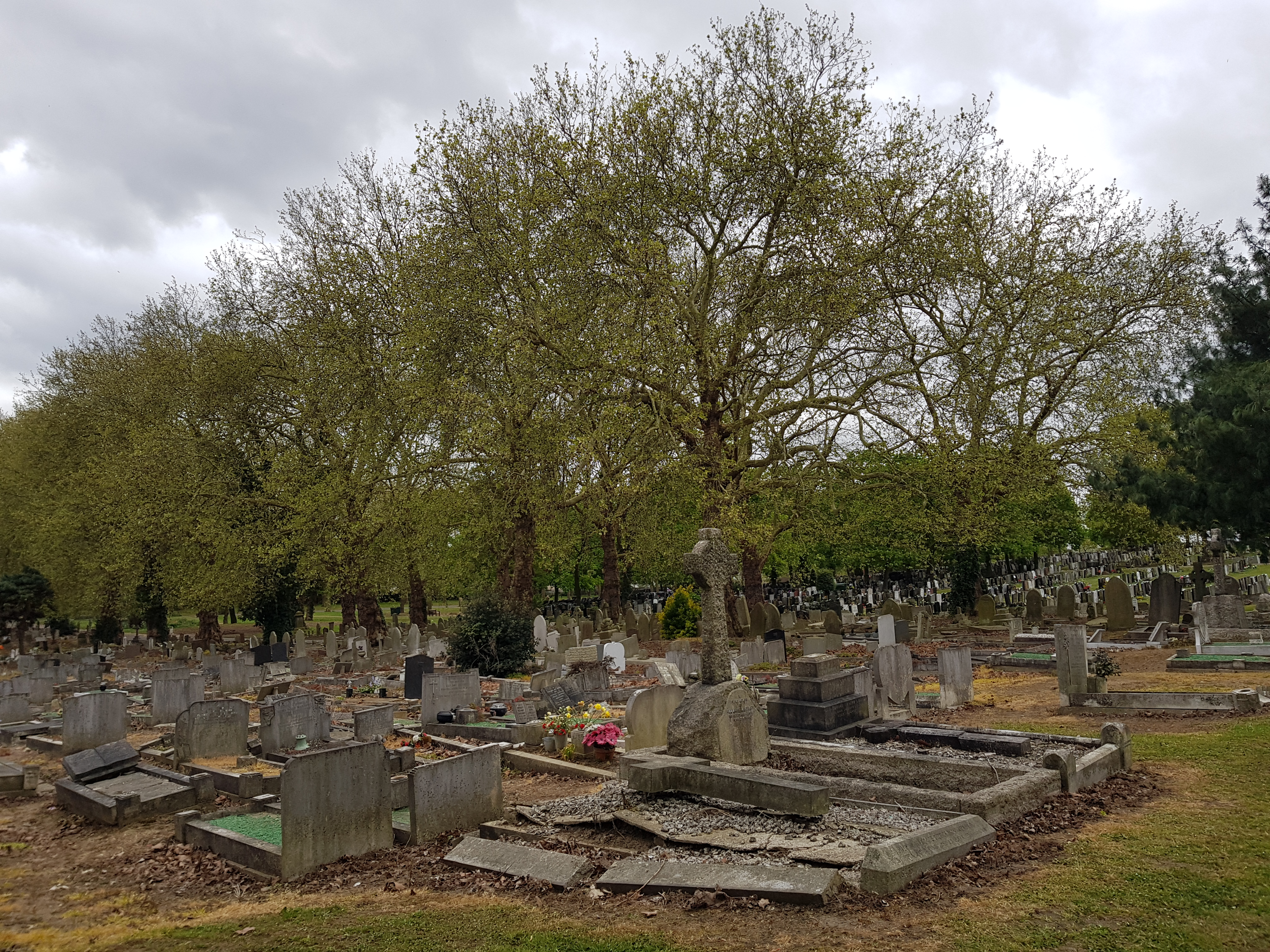
- Interactive map of Chingford Mount Cemetery

Details
- Established: May 1884
- Country: England
- Coordinates: 51°37′20″N 0°00′41″W
- Type: non-denominational
- Size: 41 1/2 acres (16.8 hectares)
- Find a Grave: Chingford Mount Cemetery

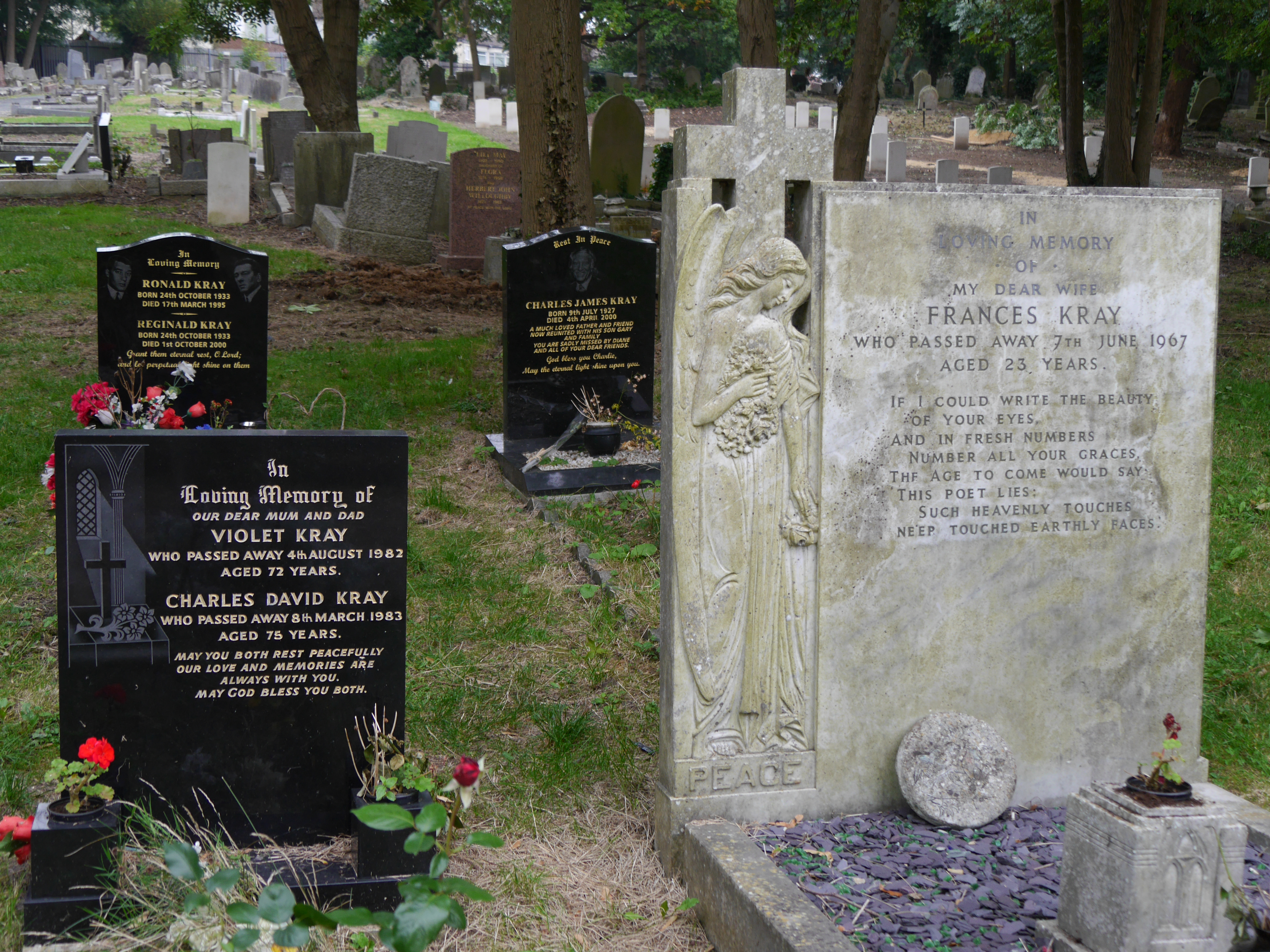
Kray family graves

Chingford Mount Cemetery is a non-denominational cemetery in Chingford Mount, in the London Borough of Waltham Forest.

The main entrance is opposite Chingford Old Church. Opened in May 1884, 41 1/2 acres (16.8 hectares) in size, it was laid out on the site of the house and grounds of Caroline Mount. Chingford Mount Cemetery was opened as a sister-site to the already established Abney Park Cemetery, which had opened in 1840 as part of the Magnificent Seven Cemeteries which circled London. The cemetery includes a crematorium.

Abney Park opened in response to the burial conditions of cemeteries in the inner city. Originally a joint-stock company and inheriting the mantle of Bunhill Fields, the company was made over in 1884 and run as a commercial venture. Chingford Mount was the first new site to open under this regime, followed by Hendon Park and Greenford. Following the collapse of the managing company in the 1970s, plans were submitted to turn over unused parts of the burial ground for redevelopment as housing. Objections from local residents halted this plan and the cemetery is now under the care of the London Borough of Waltham Forest.

Among those buried in the cemetery are sculptor John Bacon, the Kray twins and other members of their crime family, the meteorologist John William Tripe, Benjamin Pollock, founder of Pollock's Toy Museum and Benjamin Pollock's Toy Shop, and the stage and film actor Leslie Phillips. The cemetery contains the war graves of 139 Commonwealth service personnel of World War I and 182 of World War II, with the names of those whose graves have no headstones being listed on a low screen wall surrounding the War Graves Plot in Section F13.

The cemetery is home to a variety of trees and wildlife.
