= George Cornell =

English gangster (1927–1966)

- Born: George Myers; 13 November 1927; Stepney, London
- Died: 10 March 1966 (aged 38); Whitechapel, London
- Cause of death: Shot by Ronnie Kray
- Occupation: Scrap metal dealer
- Spouse: Olive Hudd (m. 1955)
- Children: 3
- Allegiance: Richardson Gang

George Cornell (né Myers; 13 November 1927 – 10 March 1966) was an English criminal and member of The Richardsons, who were scrap metal dealers and criminals from South London.

Cornell was shot and killed by Ronnie Kray at The Blind Beggar public house in Whitechapel in the East End of London. Kray was sentenced to life imprisonment three years later for the murder and remained in Broadmoor Hospital until his death from a heart attack on 17 March 1995.

== Early life ==
George Myers was born in the old boundary of St-George-in-the-East on 13 November 1927, to unwed parents, one of seven or eight children.

George and his siblings reportedly changed their surname by deed poll from Myers to Cornell, for their stepfather Joseph Cornell who married their mother, Mary Ann Garrett.

From the age of 12, Cornell often worked as a Billingsgate fish porter, and then at the nearby docks where he ran credit rackets and became friends with Lennie Hamilton and Billy Frost.

Cornell did his National Service with Billy Wiltshire, the Kray twins' cousin.

== Criminal history ==
On 30 October 1944, his first conviction (as George Myers) came for stealing chickens. In May 1945, he was imprisoned for three years for garage-breaking and larceny after stealing goods.

In 1950 (as George Cornell), he received his first prison sentence, of fifteen months, after being convicted at the Central Criminal Court for unlawful wounding and malicious damage.

In 1952, Cornell received fines for assault and wilful damage. In 1953, Cornell was imprisoned for shop breaking (stealing cigarettes and razor blades). He also assaulted two police officers and used insulting words and behaviour, getting off with a 40 shilling fine.

Cornell went on to face several more spells in prison, one for malicious wounding when he is believed to have slashed a woman's face with a blade. His last spell in prison was in 1963.

Cornell was originally a member of an East End gang called The Watney Streeters, and later became involved with the Kray twins. However he changed sides around 1964 and allied himself with The Richardsons, led by Keith Askem and brothers Charlie and Eddie Richardson.

Cornell, along with The Richardsons colleague and friend "Mad" Frankie Fraser, became an enforcer for the Richardsons and was primarily used by them for talks with the Krays. Meetings were often held in pubs such as The Grave Maurice.

== Death ==
On 9 March 1966, Cornell and his friend Albie Woods entered The Blind Beggar pub, ordered some light ales and then sat upon stools next to the bar. At around 8:30 pm, both men were approached by Ronnie Kray and a Kray associate, Ian Barrie; upon seeing him, Cornell smiled and said sardonically, "Well, just look who's here". As a warning to the barmaid and the few others in the pub, Barrie fired two shots into the ceiling, while Kray walked towards Cornell, took out a 9mm Luger, and calmly shot him once in the top of the forehead, above his right eye. The men turned and departed to a waiting car on the street.

Cornell slumped against a nearby pillar, the bullet, apparently, passing straight through him. He was taken to a nearby hospital, where he died around 3:30 am the following day, aged 38. Cornell was buried in Camberwell New Cemetery, South London.

The news spread rapidly. Although Ronnie Kray was identified by several eyewitnesses as he calmly left the public house, no one would agree to testify against him and the police were forced to release him from custody. Cornell was most prominently known for reportedly being the first victim of Ronnie Kray.

== Old Bailey trial and after ==
On 4 March 1969, Ronnie Kray was unanimously found guilty by a jury at the Old Bailey of the murder of Cornell. Reggie Kray was also found guilty of murdering Jack McVitie, who was killed in 1967. They were both sentenced to life imprisonment.

Ronnie Kray died on 17 March 1995 at the age of 61 at Wexham Park Hospital in Slough, Berkshire. He had suffered a heart attack at Broadmoor Hospital two days earlier. Reggie Kray died on 1 October 2000 at the age of 66 after being released from prison on compassionate grounds from terminal cancer.
