= Edgar Allan Poe Award for Best Fact Crime =

Annual American literary award

The Edgar Allan Poe Award for Best Fact Crime, established in 1948, is presented to nonfiction hardcover, paperback, or electronic books about mystery. The category, part of the Edgar Awards includes both true crime books, as well as books "detailing how to solve actual crimes."

The Edgar Allan Poe Award for Best Fact Crime winners are listed below.

== Recipients ==
=== 1940s ===
1940s Best Fact Crime winners
Year	Author	Title	Result	Ref.
1948	Edward D. Radin	Twelve Against the Law	Winner	
1949	Marie Rodell (editor)	Regional Murder	Winner	

=== 1950s ===
1950s Best Fact Crime winners
Year	Author	Title	Result	Ref.
1950	Joseph Henry Jackson	Bad Company	Winner	
1951	Edward D. Radin	Twelve Against Crime	Winner	
1951	William T. Brannon	N/A (Note: Brannon was nominated "for general excellence in fact crime writing".)	Shortlist	
1952	St. Clair McKelway	True Tales from the Annals of Crime and Rascality	Winner	
1952	W. T. Brannon	Lady Killers	Shortlist	
1953	Erle Stanley Gardner	Court of Last Resort	Winner	
1954	John Bartlow Martin	Why Did They Kill?	Winner	
1955	Charles Boswell and Lewis Thompson	The Girl with the Scarlet Brand	Winner	
1956	Manly Wade Wellman	Dead and Gone	Winner	
1956	Lillian de la Torre	The Truth About Belle Guness	Shortlist	
1956	Robert J. Donovan	The Assassins	Shortlist	
1957	Charles Samuels and Louise Samuels	Night Fell on Georgia	Winner	
1957	William Bradford Huie	Ruby McCollum, The Woman in the Suwanne Jail	Shortlist	
1957	Hugh Ross Williamson	Historical Whodunits	Shortlist	
1958	Harold R. Danforth and James D. Horan	The D.A.'s Man	Winner	
1958	Lenore Glen Offord and Joseph Henry Jackson	The Girl in the Belfry	Shortlist	
1958	Henry Goddard, edited by Patrick Pringle	Memoirs of a Bow Street Runner	Shortlist	
1959	Wenzell Brown	They Died in the Chair	Winner	
1959	Edward D. Radin	The Deadly Reasons	Shortlist	
1959	Sam Kollman as told to Hillel Black	The Royal Vultures	Shortlist	
1959	Edgar Lustgarten	The Murder and the Trial	Shortlist	
1959	Berton Donovan	The Incurable Wound	Shortlist	

=== 1960s ===
1960s Best Fact Crime winners
Year	Author	Title	Result	Ref.
1960	Thomas Gallagher	Fire at Sea	Winner	
1960	Eugene B. Block	Great Train Robberies of the West	Shortlist	
1961	Miriam Allen deFord	The Overbury Affair	Winner	
1961	Sir Sydney Smith	Mostly Murder	Shortlist	
1961	Christianna Brand	Heaven Knows Who	Shortlist	
1962	Barrett Prettyman, Jr.	Death and the Supreme Court	Winner	
1962	Paul Holmes	The Sheppard Murder Case	Shortlist	
1962	Edward D. Radin	Lizzie Borden: The Untold Story	Shortlist	
1962	George Waller	Kidnap	Shortlist	
1963	Francis Russell	Tragedy in Dedham	Winner	
1964	Gerold Frank	The Deed	Winner	
1964	Brad Williams	Flight 967	Shortlist	
1964	Peter Wyden	The Hired Killers	Shortlist	
1965	Anthony Lewis	Gideon's Trumpet	Winner	
1965	William Kunstler	The Minister and the Choir Singer	Shortlist	
1965	Norman Lewis	The Honored Society	Shortlist	
1965	Wayne G. Broehl, Jr.	The Molly Maguires	Shortlist	
1965	Arthur H. Lewis	Lament for the Molly Maguires	Shortlist	
1966	Truman Capote	In Cold Blood	Winner	
1966	Harry Golden	A Little Girl is Dead	Shortlist	
1966	Michael V. DiSalle with Lawrence G. Blochman	The Power of Life and Death	Shortlist	
1966	Miriam Allen deFord	Murderers Sane and Mad	Shortlist	
1966	Jürgen Thorwald	The Century of the Detective	Shortlist	
1967	Gerold Frank	The Boston Strangler	Winner	
1967	Julian Symons	Crime and Detection	Shortlist	
1967	Elwyn Jones	The Last Two to Hang	Shortlist	
1968	Victoria Lincoln	A Private Disgrace	Winner	
1968	Margaret Kreig	Black Market Medicine	Shortlist	
1968	Selwyn Raab	Justice in the Back Room	Shortlist	
1968	Curt Gentry	Frame-Up	Shortlist	
1969	John Walsh	Poe the Detective	Winner	
1969	John Frasca	The Mulberry Tree	Shortlist	
1969	Norman Zierold	Three Sisters in Black	Shortlist	

=== 1970s ===
1970s Best Fact Crime winners
Year	Author	Title	Result	Ref.
1970	Herbert B. Ehrmann	The Case that Will Not Die	Winner	
1970	Don T. Block	Scottsboro	Shortlist	
1970	Bernard Lefkowitz and Kenneth Gross	The Victims	Shortlist	
1970	Fred C. Shapiro	Whitmore	Shortlist	
1971	Mildred Savage	A Great Fall	Winner	
1971	Girard Chester	The Ninth Juror	Shortlist	
1971	Ramsey Clark	Crime in America	Shortlist	
1972	Sandor Frankel	Beyond a Reasonable Doubt	Winner	
1972	Robert Sullivan	The Disappearance of Dr. Parkman	Shortlist	
1972	William A. Clark	The Girl on the Volkswagen Floor	Shortlist	
1973	Stephen Fay, Lewis Chester, and Magnus Linkletter	Hoax	Winner	
1973	A. C. Greene	The Santa Claus Bank Robbery	Shortlist	
1973	Gordon Thomas and Max Morgan-Witts	Shipwreck	Shortlist	
1973	T. P. Slattery	They Got to Find Me Guilty Yet	Shortlist	
1974	Barbara Levy	Legacy of Death	Winner	
1974	Louis Nizer	The Implosion Conspiracy	Shortlist	
1974	Paulette Cooper	The Medical Detectives	Shortlist	
1974	John Pearson	The Profession of Violence	Shortlist	
1974	Ed Cray	Burden of Proof	Shortlist	
1975	Vincent Bugliosi and Curt Gentry	Helter Skelter	Winner	
1975	Gerald Meyer	The Memphis Murders	Shortlist	
1975	Ernest Tidyman	Dummy	Shortlist	
1976	Tom Wicker	A Time to Die	Winner	
1976	Gene Miller	Invitation to a Lynching	Shortlist	
1976	Isser Harel	The House on Garibaldi Street	Shortlist	
1977	Thomas Thompson	Blood and Money	Winner	
1977	Edward Keyes	The Michigan Murders	Shortlist	
1977	Margaret Anne Barnes	Murder in Coweta County	Shortlist	
1978	George Jonas and Barbara Amiel	By Persons Unknown	Winner	
1978	Lacey Fosburgh	Closing Time: The True Story of the Goodbar Murder	Shortlist	
1978	Clark Howard	Six Against the Rock	Shortlist	
1978	Vin McLellan and Paul Avery	The Voice of Guns	Shortlist	
1978	Roberta S. Feuerlicht	Justice Crucified	Shortlist	
1979	Vincent Bugliosi and Ken Hurwitz	Til Death Do Us Part	Winner	
1979	Jack W. Baugh and Jefferson Morgan	Why Have They Taken Our Children?	Shortlist	
1979	Charles Silberman	Criminal Violence	Shortlist	
1979	Alan Weinstein	Perjury	Shortlist	

=== 1980s ===
Year	Author	Title	Result	Ref.
1980	Robert Lindsey	The Falcon and the Snowman	Winner	
1980	Shana Alexander	Anyone's Daughter	Shortlist	
1980	Gary Cartwright	Blood Will Tell	Shortlist	
1980	Stephen H. Gettinger	Sentenced to Die	Shortlist	
1980	Clark Howard	Zebra	Shortlist	
1981	Fred Harwell	A True Deliverance	Winner	
1981	John Dinges and Saul Landau	Assassination on Embassy Row	Shortlist	
1981	Thomas Hawser	The Trial of Policeman Thomas Shea	Shortlist	
1982	Robert W. Greene	The Sting Man	Winner	
1982	Ellen Godfrey	By Reason of Doubt	Shortlist	
1982	Gregory Wallance	Papa's Game	Shortlist	
1982	Seymour Reit	The Day They Stole the Mona Lisa	Shortlist	
1982	Daniel Keyes	The Minds of Billy Milligan	Shortlist	
1983	Richard Hammer	The Vatican Connection	Winner	
1983	Ernest Tidyman	Big Bucks	Shortlist	
1983	William Randolph Stevens	Deadly Intentions	Shortlist	
1983	David McClintick	Indecent Exposure	Shortlist	
1983	Myron Farber	Somebody is Lying: The Story of Doctor X.	Shortlist	
1984	Shana Alexander	Very Much a Lady	Winner	
1984	Lawrence O'Donnell	Deadly Force	Shortlist	
1984	B.C. Hall and Bob Lancaster	Judgement Day	Shortlist	
1984	Jack Olsen	Son	Shortlist	
1984	William Wright	The Von Bulow Affair	Shortlist	
1985	Mike Weiss	Double Play: The San Francisco City Hall Killings	Winner	
1985	John Cornwell	Earth to Earth	Shortlist	
1985	Jim Atkinson and John Bloom	Evidence of Love: A True Story of Passion and Death in the Suburbs	Shortlist	
1985	David Black	Murder at the Met	Shortlist	
1985	Jane Pejsa	The Molineux Affair	Shortlist	
1986	Stephen M.L. Aronson and Natalie Robins	Savage Grace	Winner	
1986	Jonathan Coleman	At Mother's Request: A True Story of Money, Murder, and Betrayal	Shortlist	
1986	Shana Alexander	Nutcracker: Money, Madness, Murder: A Family Album	Shortlist	
1986	Gordon Burn	Somebody's Husband, Somebody's Son: The Story of the Yorkshire Ripper	Shortlist	
1986	Ludovic Kennedy	The Airman and the Carpenter: The Lindbergh Kidnapping and the Framing of Richard Hauptmann	Shortlist	
1986	Brian Kates	The Murder of a Shopping Bag Lady	Shortlist	
1987	Carlton Stowers	Careless Whispers: The True Story of a Triple Murder and the Determined Lawman Who Wouldn't Give Up	Winner	
1987	Johnny France and Malcolm McConnell	Incident at Big Sky: Sheriff Johnny France and the Mountain Men	Shortlist	
1987	Alan Prendergast	The Poison Tree: A True Story of Family Violence and Revenge	Shortlist	
1987	Daniel Keyes	Unveiling Claudia: A True Story of Serial Murder	Shortlist	
1987	Nicholas Pileggi	Wiseguy: Life in a Mafia Family	Shortlist	
1988	Richard Hammer	CBS Murders	Winner	
1988	Robert Mayer	Dreams of Ada	Shortlist	
1988	Loretta Schwartz-Nobel	Engaged to Murder	Shortlist	
1988	Stephen Singular	Talked to Death	Shortlist	
1988	Ira Berkow	The Man Who Robbed the Pierre	Shortlist	
1989	Harry N. MacLean	In Broad Daylight	Winner	
1989	Robert Lindsey	A Gathering of Saints	Shortlist	
1989	Pete Earley	Family of Spies: Inside the John Walker Spy Ring	Shortlist	
1989	Lindsey Gruson and John Hubner	Monkey on a Stick	Shortlist	
1989	Paul Eddy, Hugo Sabogal, and Sara Walden	The Cocaine Wars	Shortlist	

=== 1990s ===
1990s Best Fact Crime winners
Year	Author	Title	Result	Ref.
1990	Jack Olsen	Doc: The Rape of the Town of Lovell	Winner	
1990	Joseph Wambaugh	The Blooding: The True Story of the Narborough Village Murders	Shortlist	
1990	Linda Wolfe	Wasted: The Preppie Murder	Shortlist	
1990	Peter Elkind	The Death Shift: The True Story of Nurse Genene Jones and the Texas Baby Murders	Shortlist	
1990	Darcy O'Brien	Murder in Little Egypt	Shortlist	
1991	Peter Maas	In a Child's Name	Winner	
1991	John Cummings and Ernest Volkman	Goombata	Shortlist	
1991	Ken Englade	Beyond Reason	Shortlist	
1991	Barry Siegel	A Death in White Bear Lake	Shortlist	
1992	David Simon	Homicide: A Year on the Killing Streets	Winner	
1992	Christopher Joyce and Eric Stover	Witnesses from the Grace: The Stories Bones Tell	Shortlist	
1992	Joseph F. O'Brien and Andris Kurins	Boss of Bosses: The Fall of the Godfather: The FBI and Pauk Castellano	Shortlist	
1992	James B. Stewart	Den of Thieves	Shortlist	
1992	Charles C. Thompson II and James P. Cole	Death of Elvis: What Really Happened	Shortlist	
1993	Harry Farrell	Swift Justice	Winner	
1993	Jana Bommersbach	The Trunk Murderess: Winnie Ruth Judd	Shortlist	
1993	Thomas H. Cook	Blood Echoes	Shortlist	
1993	Ann Rule	Everything She Ever Wanted	Shortlist	
1993	Jim Schutze	My Husband's Trying to Kill Me	Shortlist	
1994	Bella Stumbo	Until the Twelfth of Never	Winner	
1994	Noel Behn	Lindbergh: The Crime	Shortlist	
1994	Steven Naifeh and Gregory White Smith	Final Justice	Shortlist	
1994	Jack Olsen	The Misbegotten Son	Shortlist	
1994	David Protess and Rob Warden	Gone in the Night	Shortlist	
1995	Joe Domanick	To Protect and to Serve	Winner	
1995	Jerry Bledsoe	Before He Wakes	Shortlist	
1995	Edward Humes	Mississippi Mud	Shortlist	
1995	Dennis McDougal	In the Best of Families	Shortlist	
1995	Eileen McNamara	Breakdown	Shortlist	
1996	Pete Earley	Circumstantial Evidence	Winner	
1996	John Douglas and Mark Olshaker	Mindhunter	Shortlist	
1996	T. J. English	Born to Kill	Shortlist	
1996	James Neff	Unfinished Murder	Shortlist	
1996	Jim Schutze	By Two and Two	Shortlist	
1997	Darcy O'Brien	Power to Hurt	Winner	
1998	Carlton Stowers	To the Last Breath	Winner	
1998	Jerry Bledsoe	Death Sentence	Shortlist	
1998	Rich Cohen	Tough Jews	Shortlist	
1998	Timothy Dumas	Greentown	Shortlist	
1998	Richard A. Serrano	One of Ours	Shortlist	
1999	Richard Firstman	The Death of Innocents	Winner	
1999	Bernard Lefkowitz	Our Guys: The Glen Ridge Rape and the Secret Life of the Perfect Suburb	Shortlist	
1999	Ben MacIntyre	The Napoleon of Crime: The Life and Times of Adam Worth, Master Thief	Shortlist	
1999	Ann Rule	Bitter Harvest: A Woman's Fury, a Mother's Sacrifice	Shortlist	
1999	John C. Tucker	May God Have Mercy: A True Story of Crime and Punishment	Shortlist	

=== 2000s ===
2000s Best Fact Crime winners and shortlists
Year	Author	Title	Result	Ref.
2000	James B. Stewart	Blind Eye	Winner	
2000	Ann Rule	And Never Let Her Go	Shortlist	
2000	James St. James	Disco Bloodbath	Shortlist	
2000	Edward Humes	Mean Justice	Shortlist	
2000	Jim Fisher	The Ghosts of Hopewell	Shortlist	
2001	Dick Lehr and Gerard O'Neill	Black Mass: The Irish Mob, The FBI, & A Devil's Deal	Winner	
2001	Don Foster	Author Unknown: On the Trail of Anonymous	Shortlist	
2001	John Evangelist Walsh	Moonlight: Abraham Lincoln and the Almanac Trial	Shortlist	
2001	Jeanne Boylan	Portraits of Guilt: The Woman Who Profiles the Faces of America's Deadliest Criminals	Shortlist	
2001	Joshua Armstrong and Anthony Bruno	The Seekers: A Bounty Hunter's Story	Shortlist	
2002	Kent Walker	Son of a Grifter	Winner	
2002	Jonathan H. Pincus	Base Instincts: What Makes a Killer Kill?	Shortlist	
2002	Roy Hazelwood and Stephen G. Michaud	Dark Dreams: Sexual Violence, Homicide and the Criminal Mind	Shortlist	
2002	Joe Jackson	Leavenworth Train: A Fugitive's Search for Justice in the Vanishing West	Shortlist	
2002	James Neff	The Wrong Man: The Final Verdict in the Dr. Sam Sheppard Murder Case	Shortlist	
2003	Joseph Wambaugh	Fire Lover	Winner	
2003	Albert Borowitz	Blood and Ink: International Guide to Fact-Based Crime Literature	Shortlist	
2003	James Ruddick	Death at the Priory: Sex, Love and Murder in Victorian England	Shortlist	
2003	Douglas Century and Rick Cowan	Takedown: The Fall of the Last Mafia Empire	Shortlist	
2003	John Taylor	The Count and the Confession	Shortlist	
2004	Erik Larson	The Devil in the White City	Winner	
2004	Steve Oney	And the Dead Shall Rise: The Murder of Mary Phagan & the Lynching of Leo Frank	Shortlist	
2004	Steve Hodel	Black Dahlia Avenger – The True Story	Shortlist	
2004	Dick Lehr and Mitchell Zuckoff	Judgement Ridge: The True Story Behind the Dartmouth Murders	Shortlist	
2004	David Pietrusza	Rothstien: The Life, Times, & Murder of the Criminal Genius Who Fixed the 1919 World Series	Shortlist	
2005	Edward Dolnick	Conviction: Solving the Moxley Murder: A Reporter and a Detective's Twenty-Year Search for Justice	Winner	
2005	Suzanne O'Malley	Are You There Alone?: The Unspeakable Crime of Andrea Yates	Shortlist	
2005	Julian Rubinstein	Ballad of the Whiskey Robber: A True Story of Bank Heists, Ice Hockey, Transylvanian Pelt Smuggling, Moonlighting Detectives, and Broken Hearts	Shortlist	
2005	D.P. Lyle	Forensics for Dummies	Shortlist	
2005	Ann Rule	Green River, Running Red: The Real Story of the Green River Killer – America's Deadliest Serial Murderer	Shortlist	
2005	Marissa N. Batt	Ready for the People: My Most Chilling Cases as Prosecutor	Shortlist	
2006	Edward Dolnick	Rescue Artist: A True Story of Art, Thieves, and the Hunt for a Missing Masterpiece	Winner	
2006	Jed Horne	Desire Street: A True Story of Death and Deliverance in New Orleans	Shortlist	
2006	John Emsley	The Elements of Murder: The History of Poison	Shortlist	
2006	Michael Finkel	True Story: Murder, Memoir, Mea Culpa	Shortlist	
2006	Diane Fanning	Written in Blood	Shortlist	
2007	James L. Swanson	Manhunt: The 12-Day Chase for Lincoln's Killer	Winner	
2007	Sebastian Junger	A Death in Belmont	Shortlist	
2007	Kate Clark Flora Joseph K. Loughlin	Finding Amy: A True Story of Murder in Maine	Shortlist	
2007	Robin Odell	Ripperology: A Study of the World's First Serial Killer	Shortlist	
2007	Terri Jentz	Strange Piece of Paradise	Shortlist	
2007	Daniel Stashower	The Beautiful Cigar Girl: Mary Rogers, Edgar Allan Poe and the Invention of Murder	Shortlist	
2008	Vincent Bugliosi	The Assassination of President John F. Kennedy	Winner	
2008	Kevin Flynn	Relentless Pursuit: A True Story of Family, Murder, and the Prosecutor Who Wouldn't Quit	Shortlist	
2008	Bruce Watson	Sacco and Vanzetti: The Men, The Murders and the Judgment of Mankind	Shortlist	
2008	Stanley Alpert	The Birthday Party	Shortlist	
2009	Howard Blum	American Lightning: Terror, Mystery and the Birth of Hollywood, and the Crime of the Century	Winner	
2009	Simon Baatz	For the Thrill of It: Leopold, Loeb and the Murder that Shocked Chicago	Shortlist	
2009	T.J. English	Havana Nocturne: How the Mob Owned Cuba and Then Lost it to the Revolution	Shortlist	
2009	Jonathan Lopez	The Man Who Made Vermeers: Unvarnishing the Legend of Master Forger Hans van Meegeren	Shortlist	
2009	Kate Summerscale	The Suspicions of Mr. Whicher	Shortlist	

=== 2010s ===
2010s Best Fact Crime winners and shortlists
Year	Author	Title	Result	Ref.
2010	Dave Cullen	Columbine	Winner	
2010	Jeff Guinn	Go Down Together: The True, Untold Story of Bonnie and Clyde	Shortlist	
2010	Laney Salisbury Aly Sujo	Provenance: How a Con Man and a Forger Rewrote the History of Modern Art	Shortlist	
2010	Dick Lehr	The Fence: A Police Cover-Up Along Bostons Racial Divide	Shortlist	
2010	R. A. Scotti	Vanished Smile: The Mysterious Theft of Mona Lisa	Shortlist	
2011	Ken Armstrong Nick Perry	Scoreboard, Baby: A Story of College Football, Crime and Complicity	Winner	
2011	Scott Higham Sari Horwitz	Finding Chandra: A True Washington Murder Mystery	Shortlist	
2011	Hampton Sides	Hellhound on his Trail: The Stalking of Martin Luther King, Jr. and the International Hunt for his Assassin	Shortlist	
2011	Alex Heard	The Eyes of Willie McGee: A Tragedy of Race, Sex, and Secrets in Jim Crow South	Shortlist	
2011	Douglas Starr	The Killer of Little Shepherds: A True Crime Story and the Birth of Forensic Science	Shortlist	
2012	Candice Millard	Destiny of the Republic: A Tale of Madness, Medicine and the Murder of a President	Winner	
2012	Paul Collins	The Murder of the Century: The Gilded Age Crime That Scandalized a City and Sparked the Tabloid Wars	Shortlist	
2012	T. J. English	The Savage City: Race, Murder, and a Generation on the Edge	Shortlist	
2012	Steve Miller	Girl, Wanted: The Chase for Sarah Pender	Shortlist	
2012	Mark Seal	The Man in the Rockefeller Suit: The Astonishing Rise and Spectacular Fall of a Serial Imposter	Shortlist	
2013	Paul French	Midnight in Peking	Winner	
2013	Gilbert King	Devil in the Grove: Thurgood Marshall, the Groveland Boys, and the Dawn of a New America	Shortlist	
2013	Ben Macintyre	Double Cross: The True Story of the D-Day Spies	Shortlist	
2013	P. D. Lyle	More Forensics and Fiction: Crime Writers' Morbidly Curious Questions Expertly Answered	Shortlist	
2013	Richard Lloyd Parry	The People Who Eat Darkness: The True Story of a Young Woman Who Vanished from the Streets of Tokyo – and the Evil that Swallowed Her Up	Shortlist	
2014	Daniel Stashower	The Hour of Peril: The Secret Plot to Murder Lincoln Before the Civil War	Winner	
2014	Paul Collins	Duel with the Devil: The True Story of How Alexander Hamilton and Aaron Burr Teamed Up to Take on America's First Sensational Murder Mystery	Shortlist	
2014	Michael D'Antonio	Mortal Sins: Sex, Crime, and the Era of Catholic Scandal	Shortlist	
2014	Charles Graeber	The Good Nurse: A True Story of Medicine, Madness and Murder	Shortlist	
2014	Cate Lineberry	The Secret Rescue: An Untold Story of American Nurses and the Medics Behind Nazi Lines	Shortlist	
2015	William J. Mann	Tinseltown: Murder, Morphine, and Madness at the Dawn of Hollywood	Winner	
2015	Kevin Cook	Kitty Genovese: The Murder, the Bystanders, the Crime that Changed America	Shortlist	
2015	Carl Hoffman	The Savage Harvest: A Tale of Cannibals, Colonialism, and Michael Rockefeller's Tragic Quest for Primitive Art	Shortlist	
2015	Lacy M. Johnson	The Other Side: A Memoir	Shortlist	
2015	Harold Schechter	The Mad Sculptor: The Maniac, the Model, and the Murder that Shook the Nation	Shortlist	
2016	Allen Kurzweil	Whipping Boy: The Forty-Year Search for My Twelve-Year-Old Bully	Winner	
2016	Eric Bogosian	Operation Nemesis: The Assassination Plot that Avenged the Armenian genocide	Shortlist	
2016	T. J. English	Where the Bodies Were Buried: Whitey Bulger and the World That Made Him	Shortlist	
2016	Val McDermid	Forensics: What Bugs, Burns, Prints, DNA and More Tell Us About Crime	Shortlist	
2016	John Temple	American Pain: How a Young Felon and his Ring of Doctors Unleashed America's Deadliest Drug Epidemic	Shortlist	
2017	Kate Summerscale	The Wicked Boy: The Mystery of a Victorian Child Murderer	Winner	
2017	Vincent diMaio Ron Franscell	Morgue: A Life in Death	Shortlist	
2017	Laurence Leamer	The Lynching: The Epic Courtroom Battle that Brought Down the Klan	Shortlist	
2017	Paul Thomas Murphy	Pretty Jane and the Viper of Kidbrooke Lane: A True Story of Victorian Law and Disorder: The Unsolved Murder that Shocked Victorian England	Shortlist	
2017	Eli Sanders	While the City Slept: A Love Lost to Violence and a Young Man's Descent into Madness	Shortlist	
2018	David Grann	Killers of the Flower Moon: The Osage Murders and the Birth of the FBI	Winner	
2018	Jeff Guinn	The Road to Jonestown: Jim Jones and Peoples Temple	Shortlist	
2018	Monica Hesse	American Fire: Love, Arson, and Life in a Vanishing Land	Shortlist	
2018	Bill James	The Man From the Train: The Solving of a Century-Old Serial Killer Mystery	Shortlist	
2018	Brad Ricca	Mrs. Sherlock Holmes: The True Story of New York City's Greatest Female Detective and the 1917 Missing Girl Case that Captivated a Nation	Shortlist	
2019	Robert W. Fieseler	Tinderbox: The Untold Story of the Up Stairs Lounge Fire and the Rise of Gay Liberation	Winner	
2019	Jonathan Green	Sex Money Murder: A Story of Crack, Blood, and Betrayal	Shortlist	
2019	Carl Hoffman	The Last Wild Men of Borneo: A True Story of Death and Treasure	Shortlist	
2019	Kirk Wallace Johnson	The Feather Thief: Beauty, Obsession, and the Natural History Heist of the Century	Shortlist	
2019	Michelle McNamara	I'll Be Gone in the Dark: One Woman's Obsessive Search for the Golden State Killer	Shortlist	
2019	Alex Perry	The Good Mothers: The True Story of the Women Who Took on the World's Most Powerful Mafia	Shortlist	

=== 2020s ===
2020s Best Fact Crime winners and shortlists
Year	Author	Title	Result	Ref.
2020	Axton Betz-Hamilton	The Less People Know About Us: A Mystery of Betrayal, Family Secrets, and Stolen Identity	Winner	
2020	Karen Abbott	The Ghosts of Eden Park: The Bootleg King, the Women Who Pursued Him, and the Murder that Shocked Jazz-Age America	Shortlist	
2020	Maureen Callahan	American Predator: The Hunt for the Most Meticulous Serial Killer of the 21st Century	Shortlist	
2020	Peter Houlahan	Norco '80: The True Story of the Most Spectacular Bank Robbery in American History	Shortlist	
2020	James Polchin	Indecent Advances: A Hidden History of True Crime and Prejudice Before Stonewall	Shortlist	
2021	Eric Eyre	Death in Mud Lick: A Coal Country Fight Against the Drug Companies that Delivered the Opioid Epidemic	Winner	
2021	Mark A. Bradley	Blood Runs Coal: The Yablonski Murders and the Battle for the United Mine Workers of America	Shortlist	
2021	Emma Copley Eisenberg	The Third Rainbow Girl: The Long Life of a Double Murder in Appalachia	Shortlist	
2021	Sierra Crane Murdoch	Yellow Bird: Oil, Murder, and a Woman's Search for Justice in Indian Country	Shortlist	
2021	Ariel Sabar	Veritas: A Harvard Professor, a Con Man, and the Gospel of Jesus's Wife	Shortlist	
2022	Elon Green	Last Call: A True Story of Love, Lust, and Murder in Queer New York	Winner	
2022	Margalit Fox	The Confidence Men: How Two Prisoners of War Engineered the Most Remarkable Escape in History	Shortlist	
2022	Ann Hagedorn	Sleeper Agent: The Atomic Spy in America Who Got Away	Shortlist	
2022	Ellen McGarrahan	Two Truths and a Lie: A Murder, a Private Investigator, and Her Search for Justice	Shortlist	
2022	Benjamin T Smith	The Dope: The Real History of the Mexican Drug Trade	Shortlist	
2022	Curtis Wilkie	When Evil Lived in Laurel: The "White Knights" and the Murder of Vernon Dahmer	Shortlist	
2023	Erika Krouse	Tell Me Everything: The Story of a Private Investigation	Winner	
2023	Kathleen Hale	Slenderman	Shortlist	
2023	Kathryn Miles	Trailed	Shortlist	
2023	Shahan Mufti	American Caliph	Shortlist	
2023	Daniel Stashower	American Demon	Shortlist	
2024	Nathan Masters	Crooked: The Roaring '20s Tale of a Corrupt Attorney General, a Crusading Senator, and the Birth of the American Political Scandal	Winner	
2024	Kim Cross	In Light of All Darkness: Inside the Polly Klaas Kidnapping and the Search for America's Child	Shortlist	
2024	Zeke Faux	Number Go Up: Inside Crypto's Wild Rise and Staggering Fall	Shortlist	
2024	John Glatt	Tangled Vines: Power, Privilege, and the Murdaugh Family Murders	Shortlist	
2024	Barbara Rae-Venter	I Know Who You Are: How an Amateur DNA Sleuth Unmasked the Golden State Killer and Changed Crime Fighting Forever	Shortlist	
2024	Joe Sexton	The Lost Sons of Omaha: Two Young Men in an American Tragedy	Shortlist	
2025	Steven Johnson	The Infernal Machine: A True Story of Dynamite, Terror, and the Rise of the Modern Detective	Winner	
2025	Frank Figliuzzi	Long Haul: Hunting the Highway Serial Killers	Shortlist	
2025	Deb Miller Landau	A Devil Went Down to Georgia: Race, Power, Privilege, and the Murder of Lita McClinton	Shortlist	
2025	Gregg Olsen	The Amish Wife: Unraveling the Lies, Secrets, and Conspiracy that Let a Killer Go Free	Shortlist	
2025	Earl Swift	Hell Put To Shame: The 1921 Murder Farm Massacre and the Horror of America's Second Slavery	Shortlist	
2025	Michael Wolraich	The Bishop and the Butterfly: Murder, Politics, and the End of the Jazz Age	Shortlist	
2026	Caroline Fraser	Murderland: Crime and Bloodlust in the Time of Serial Killers	Winner	
2026	Mariah Blake	They Poisoned the World: Life and Death in the Age of Forever Chemicals	Shortlist	
2026	Michael Cannell	Blood and the Badge: The Mafia, Two Killer Cops, and a Scandal That Shocked the Nation	Shortlist	
2026	Gregg Olsen	Out of the Woods: A Girl, a Killer, and a Lifelong Struggle to Find the Way Home	Shortlist	
2026	Hallie Rubenhold	Story of a Murder: The Wives, the Mistress, and Dr. Crippen	Shortlist	
