= David Hirshey =

American sportswriter

- Born: New York, New York
- Education: Dickinson College
- Occupations: Editor (literary); Sportswriter

David Hirshey is an American book editor and sportswriter. The senior vice president and executive editor of HarperCollins from 1998-2016, he was previously an editor for Esquire and the New Yorker. At Esquire, he worked with writers including Martin Amis, Richard Ben Cramer, Frederick Exley, Richard Ford, David Halberstam, Norman Mailer and Tom Robbins.

An expert on soccer, Hirshey has written extensively on the sport for The New York Times, Deadspin, The Wall Street Journal, the Los Angeles Times and The Washington Post. He co-wrote The ESPN World Cup Companion: Everything You Need To Know About The Planet's Biggest Sports Event, and appeared in Once in a Lifetime: The Extraordinary Story of the New York Cosmos. In 2022, he co-edited Pride of a Nation: A Celebration of the U.S. Women's National Soccer Team, which Soccer America described as "the most compelling book ever written about any American soccer program.

== Early life and education ==
Hirshey was born in New York City. His father, Max Hirshey, a former youth international soccer player, was the president of Swarovski Crystal US and his mother, Mara Hirshey, was a writer. Hirshey attended Dickinson College, where he played varsity soccer for four years and wrote a weekly sports column for the student newspaper. He graduated with a BA in English.

== Career ==
=== New York Daily News, Esquire ===
Following his graduation, Hirshey was hired as a reporter at The New York Daily News, where he covered major sporting events including The Olympics, The US Open, and the World Series. In 1975 he broke the story that Pelé was coming to New York to play for the New York Cosmos. In 1978, he was named editor of the paper's Sunday News Magazine. In that position, he worked with writers including Jimmy Breslin and Pete Hamill. Five of Hirshey's articles for the Daily News were anthologized in Houghton Mifflin's annual Best Sports Stories of the Year.

Hirshey was hired by Esquire as a senior editor in 1984. Two years later he was promoted to articles editor, and in 1991 was named deputy editor. In addition to editing long form pieces in the magazine, he oversaw the annual "Dubious Achievement Awards" issue, which was described by The Washington Post as "hands down, the funniest year end issue of them all."

=== The New Yorker, Harper Collins ===
After leaving Esquire in 1997, Hirshey was hired as an editor at the New Yorker, where he assigned, developed and edited articles on future trends in politics, science, business, entertainment, culminating with "The Next Issue."

In 1998, he was named executive editor and vice president of HarperCollins Publishers. Promoted to senior vice president and executive editor in 2007, Hirshey specialized in politics, current affairs, sports, memoir, pop culture, and humor. Among others, Hirshey acquired and edited Seymour Hersh's Chain of Command: The Road from 9/11 to Abu Ghraib, Robert Kolker's Lost Girls: An Unsolved Mystery, Jane Leavy's Sandy Koufax: A Lefty's Legacy, Sarah Silverman's The Bedwetter: Stories of Courage, Redemption and Pee, Dan Barry's Bottom of the 33rd: Hope, Redemption, and Baseball's Longest Game, which won the 2013 Pen Award for literary sportswriting, and Allen Kurzweil's Whipping Boy: The Forty-Year Search for My Twelve-Year-Old Bully, the 2016 Edgar Award winner for best crime non-fiction. In May 2016, Hirshey announced that he would leave HarperCollins to relocate to Los Angeles. In late 2016 he was named a contributing editor at Esquire.

=== Kicking and Screaming, Eight by Eight ===
From 2010 through 2017, Hirshey wrote the weekly soccer column Kicking and Screaming for ESPN.com, In 2018, he became writer-at-large for the soccer magazine Eight by Eight. His 2019 interview with Megan Rapinoe went viral and ignited a Twitter feud with then-president Donald Trump.

== Bibliography ==
=== Selected bibliography as editor ===
- Jane Leavy (2002), Sandy Koufax: A Lefty's Legacy, HarperCollins, ISBN 9780060195335
- Jane Leavy (2010), The Last Boy: Mickey Mantle and the End of America's Childhood, HarperCollins, ISBN 9780060883522
- Dan Barry (2012), Bottom of the 33rd: Hope, Redemption, and Baseball's Longest Game, HarperCollins, ISBN 9780062014481
- Dan Barry (2016), The Boys in the Bunkhouse: Servitude and Salvation in the Heartland, HarperCollins, ISBN 9780062372130
- Seymour M. Hersh (2004), Chain of Command: The Road from 9/11 to Abu Ghraib, HarperCollins, ISBN 9780060195915
- Michael Finkel (2005), True Story: Murder, Memoir, Mea Culpa, HarperCollins, ISBN 9780060580476
- Will Blythe (2006), To Hate Like This Is To Be Happy Forever, Harper Collins, ISBN 9780060740238
- Jeff MacGregor (2005), Sunday Money: Speed! Lust! Madness! Death! a Hot Lap Around America with NASCAR, HarperCollins, ISBN 9780060094713
- George Tenet (2007), At The Center of The Storm: My Years at the CIA, HarperCollins, ISBN 9780061147784
- Sarah Silverman (2012), The Bedwetter: Stories of Courage, Redemption and Pee, HarperCollins, ISBN 9780061856433
- Robert Kolker (2013), Lost Girls: An Unsolved American Mystery, HarperCollins, ISBN 9780062183637
- Scott Saul (2014), Becoming Richard Pryor, HarperCollins, ISBN 9780062183637
- Jeff Passan (2016), The Arm: Inside the Billion-Dollar Mystery of the Most Valuable Commodity in Sports, HarperCollins, ISBN 9780062400369
- Ariel Leve (2016), An Abbreviated Life: A Memoir, HarperCollins, ISBN 9780062269454
- Pete Townshend (2012), Who I Am: A Memoir, HarperCollins, ISBN 9780062127242
- Scott Raab (2011), The Whore of Akron: One Man's Search for the Soul of LeBron James, HarperCollins, ISBN 9780062066367
- Nate Jackson (2013), Slow Getting Up: A Story of NFL Survival from the Bottom of the Pile, HarperCollins, ISBN 9780062108029
- Allen Kurzweil (2015), Whipping Boy: The Forty-Year Search for My Twelve-Year- Old Bully, HarperCollins, ISBN 9780062269485
- Jason Zinoman (2017) Letterman: The Last Giant of Late Night HarperCollins, ISBN 0062377213
- Gwendolyn Oxenham (2022), "Pride of a Nation. A Celebration of the U.S. Women's National Soccer Team", Penguin Random House ISBN 9781984860842

=== Bibliography as co-author ===
- Bodo, Peter & David Hirshey with Pelé (1977), Pele's New World, Norton, ISBN 0-393-08758-1
- Messing, Shep & David Hirshey (1978), The Education of An American Soccer Player, Dodd, Mead and Company, ISBN 0-396-07568-1
- Hirshey, David and Roger Bennett (2010) The ESPN World Cup Companion: Everything You Need to Know About the Planet's Biggest Sports Event, ESPN, ISBN 034551792X

== Filmography ==
- Once in a Lifetime: The Extraordinary Story of the New York Cosmos (2006)
