= In Vivo (disambiguation) =

In vivo may refer to:

- In vivo, experimentation using a whole, living organism
- In Vivo (novel), a 1964 novel by Mildred Savage
- In Vivo (EP), a 2003 album by rap group Loco Locass
- NVivo, a qualitative data analysis software
