= Killing of Eula Love =

1979 police shooting in Los Angeles, California

- Date: January 3, 1979
- Location: South Los Angeles
- Participants: Lloyd O’Callaghan; Edward Hopson; Eula Mae Love
- Deaths: 1
- Charges: None

Eulia Mae Love (commonly referred to as Eula Love) was a 39-year-old African-American mother and widow who was shot and killed on January 3, 1979, by officers of the Los Angeles Police Department. Although Love's death sparked outcry in South Los Angeles, the Los Angeles County District Attorney exonerated both of the police officers involved in the shooting on April 17, 1979.

== Death ==
Six months before the incident, Love's husband, William, died of sickle cell anemia, leaving Love financially strapped and solely responsible for the care of their three young daughters. On the day of the shooting, Love had an altercation with a service person from the Southern California Gas company sent to her house to collect an overdue utility bill. After going to the store to cash a check to pay the bill, Love returned home to find additional personnel from the gas company, who had called the police on her. Further upset by the new utility workers, Love went into her house and came out with a knife. When police arrived, Love threatened the officers with a boning knife.

In response, the two officers, Edward Hopson and Lloyd O'Callaghan, fired twelve shots at Love, striking her eight times at close range, killing her instantly. The officers alleged they shot her in self-defense.

== Aftermath ==
The killing generated widespread coverage in the local news media and sparked public outrage, which led the Los Angeles Police Commission to conduct its own investigation of the shooting. Black Angelenos' confidence in the LAPD declined precipitously in 1979 due in part to this case, according to Allen John Scott's book The City: Los Angeles and Urban Theory at the End of the Twentieth Century. The report led to "significant reforms in the Department's procedures on use of force."

The academic journal Crime and Social Justice later reprinted the Police Commission's report on the circumstances of the shooting. Journal editors expressed the opinion that "her killing is a crime against humanity." Journalist Joe Domanick (author of two books on the department) described Love's shooting as emblematic of the "bad old days" of the Los Angeles Police Department.

Love's death has been cited as the event that put the phrase "officer-involved shooting" into widespread use by mainstream media outlets.

This incident inspired the 1980 L.A. Rebellion feature film Gidget Meets Hondo by Bernard Nicolas.
