= The Profession of Violence =

1972 John Pearson book

- First edition book cover by Weidenfeld & Nicolson, photo taken by A Cappella Books.
- Author: John Pearson
- Series: The Kray Twins
- Genre: Biography
- Publisher: Weidenfeld & Nicolson (1972) (1st ed.); Harper Collins (2015) (5th ed.)
- Publication date: November 16, 1972
- Awards: 1974 Edgar Allan Poe Award for Best Fact Crime (Nomination)
- ISBN: 978-0-29-799584-5
- Followed by: The Cult of Violence: The Untold Story of the Krays (2001)

The Profession of Violence: The Rise and Fall of the Kray Twins is a 1972 biography of the Kray twins by John Pearson. It details the life of the twins from their births, childhood, criminal careers, and eventual arrest. It was nominated for the 1974 Edgar Allan Poe Award for Best Fact Crime. It was followed by The Cult of Violence: The Untold Story of the Krays in 2001 and Notorious: The Immortal Legend of the Kray Twins in 2010. The book was adapted into the film Legend in 2015.

== Conception ==
John Pearson says in the fifth edition book's introduction that Frank Taylor, Editor-in-Chief at McGraw Hill which published The Life of Ian Fleming, had contacted him while Pearson was in Italy in 1967 to write the biography of the Kray twins at their behest.

He then flew to London and was taken to an Elizabethan mansion where he met the Krays over dinner. Pearson recalls asking Reggie about the bandage around his thumb to which Reggie said it was because of a gardening accident; the real cause was Reggie's murder of Jack McVitie a few weeks earlier.

Pearson then says he had multiple sessions with the twins the following months, asking them about their lives. The two had bought him a flat in Bethnal Green where they grew up.

The last time Pearson saw the Krays prior to their arrest was at their mother's flat in April 1968. He describes the meeting as uncomfortable as by that point the twins had grown suspicious of others and Pearson who they thought was working for the MI5. The twins were sitting in their armchairs, playing with their boa constrictor they named "Nipper Read." They would be arrested a few weeks later by the snake's namesake.

Pearson then notes that only after their arrests did people start talking candidly about them. This was when he learned of the Krays' connection to Lord Boothby. It was not until Boothby's death in 1986 that Pearson could safely publish what he knew.

== Contents ==
The book comprises seventeen chapters, beginning with the birth of the Kray twins to their arrest in May 1968.

== Reception ==
The book received acclaim on its release. Paul Dalby of the Bristol Evening Post described the book as "exhaustively researched" and "horrifying." Tom Clayton of the Daily Telegraph called the book a "scrupulous dossier of the Twins weird career." Terry Mapes of the News Journal said the book was "potent" and "skillfully written." Gordon Smith and Judy Powell, writing for the Burton Observer and Chronicle, describes the book as "clearly written" and "powerful," with parts reading like "a violent novel."

The book was described as "the bible of the butcheoisie." It was nominated for the 1974 Edgar Allan Poe Award for Best Fact Crime.

== Film adaptation ==
The book was adapted to film in 2015. Pearson praised Tom Hardy's portrayal of the Twins and stated "[the Twins] would have loved it."
