= Le Québec est mort, Vive le Québec ! =

Le Québec est mort, vive le Québec!

Studio album by Loco Locass
- Released: June 12, 2012
- Genres: Rap, Hip hop
- Length: 72:18
- Language: French
- Label: Audiogram

Loco Locass chronology
Amour Oral	Le Québec est mort, vive le Québec!

Le Québec est mort, vive le Québec! is the third studio album released by Quebec rap group Loco Locass. It was published June 12, 2012, with 14 tracks total. This disc follows their hit album Amour Oral, published 8 years earlier, in 2004.

== Track listing ==
No.	Title	Length
1.	"[Wi]"	4:06
2.	"Le mémoire de Loco Locass"	3:51
3.	"La trahison des marchands"	3:06
4.	"Secondaire"	3:56
5.	"Du joufflu"	4:39
6.	"Tout le monde est malheureux"	3:58
7.	"Kevin et Gaétan"	4:58
8.	"Tous les jours"	3:22
9.	"M'accrocher?" (version tourmentée)	4:46
10.	"Occupation double"	4:28
11.	"Le but (Allez Montreal)"	5:22
12.	"La perle"	2:51
13.	"Les géants"	4:58
14.	"Wendigo"	16:02

== Singles ==
Le But (Allez Montreal)
