= Cirie =

Cirie may refer to:

- Cirié, a town in Italy
- Cirie (novel), a 2002 novel by Mildred Savage
- Cirie Fields (born 1970), American reality TV personality
