= The Five: The Untold Lives of the Women Killed by Jack the Ripper =

2019 non-fiction book by Hallie Rubenhold

- Author: Hallie Rubenhold
- Language: English
- Subject: Mary Ann Nichols, Annie Chapman, Elizabeth Stride, Catherine Eddowes, and Mary Jane Kelly
- Genre: Biography
- Publisher: Doubleday
- Media type: Print (hardback & paperback)
- ISBN: 9781328663818

The Five: The Untold Lives of the Women Killed by Jack the Ripper is a book by British historian Hallie Rubenhold, published by Doubleday in 2019. The book examines the lives of the "canonical five", the five women largely believed to have been killed by Jack the Ripper in the Whitechapel murders. Rubenhold claims that only two of the five women, Mary Jane Kelly and Elizabeth Stride, were sex workers. In some cases, Rubenhold claims the women may have been targeted by the Ripper just because they were homeless.

== Critical reception ==
Author Frances Wilson of The Guardian called the book "important" and praised its illumination of the lives of the women, as well as challenging long-held assumptions. Joanna Scutts of The Washington Post said that by "restoring 'the five' to humanity and dignity, Rubenhold's book becomes a passionate indictment of the true-crime genre, with its fixation on the minds of murderers and its shallow, glancing sympathy for the dead." The Times reviewer Gerard DeGroot said "The Five is an attempt at rehabilitation. ... seeks to restore to these victims the dignity "brutally taken away"." and that "Conjecture looms large in this book for the simple reason that, but for their murders, these women were members of the anonymous poor. Little is known about any of them." He adds that occasional uncertainty does not change the important truth that these women had hard lives because of poverty. The Times writer Joan Smith listed the book among the 10 best true crime books in 2025.

Wendy Smith, also writing for The Washington Post, described the book as "a blistering counter-narrative to the 'male, authoritarian, and middle class' legend of a demonic superman preying on prostitutes". Smith further says that, "[Rubenhold] has a point about the legions of books that speculate endlessly about Jack the Ripper’s identity while displaying scant interest in the five human beings he viciously dispatched. Her riveting work, both compassionate group portrait, and stinging social history, finally gives them their due." Kirkus Reviews said "Rubenhold urges us to see the victims as just that and not as the 'fallen women' of the received record." Her book strays from the common gory re-tellings of Jack the Ripper's femicides and instead adopts "a compassionate but unsentimental style" when describing the lives of the victims, wrote Jad Adams for Literary Review: "This is because she wants to look not at how they died but at how they lived."

Criminologist Paul Bleakley said that Rubenhold's unapologetically feminist approach had "disrupted the very foundations of Ripperology." and that "Rubenhold has used historical criminology to add new dimensions to the Ripper case, courting the ostracism of Ripperologists to reassert the primacy of victims in the historical narrative and, in turn, shift our approach to crime history." Historian Drew Gray said while parts of her book made Rubenhold open to criticism by knowledgeable researchers, "there has never been such a high profile and well written" book on these women. The Routledge Handbook of Jack the Ripper Studies (2025) said that while it has flaws, The Five is undeniably important, highlighting gender issues and complexities in the Ripper story.

According to Rubenhold, she received "trolling" from Ripperologists over the book, has been compared to Holocaust denier David Irving, and accused of having a cynical, feminist agenda. She stated "There's also a very misogynist undercurrent to all of this, in some cases this is a need to view the world in terms of Madonnas and whores, or good women and women who were asking for it." Literary critic Stephanie Merritt said that "Jack the Ripper is neither a hero nor a saint, but some Ripperologists feel that his enigma lends a macabre glamour, and to shift the story away from sex to the more mundane Victorian social issues of poverty, homelessness and addiction, as Rubenhold has done, is to interfere unforgivably in a narrative they feel belongs to them."

== Awards ==
The Five was shortlisted for the Wolfson History Prize in 2020 and won the 2019 Baillie Gifford Prize valued at £50,000.
