= Reg Gadney =

English painter

- Born: Reginald Bernard John Gadney; 20 January 1941; Cross Hills, West Riding of Yorkshire, England
- Died: 1 May 2018 (aged 77)
- Known for: Thriller writer Painter; Lecturer; Art historian
- Spouse: Fay Maschler
- Children: Two; Three stepchildren
- Father: Bernard Gadney
- Awards: BAFTA

Reginald Bernard John Gadney (20 January 1941 – 1 May 2018) was a painter, thriller-writer and an occasional screenwriter or screenplay adaptor. Gadney was also an officer in the Coldstream Guards in the 1960s and later wrote the biopic screenplay Goldeneye (about author Ian Fleming) which was filmed in 1989, directed by Don Boyd with Charles Dance playing Ian Fleming. Gadney cameoed as the real-life James Bond, the man who lent his name to Fleming's eponymous spy.

== Life ==
Gadney, the son of the rugby player, Bernard Gadney, was born during a secondary air raid on 20 January 1941. His was father was the headmaster at Malsis School in Cross Hills, West Riding of Yorkshire, and Gadney was born in Dorm 10 in the school when Luftwaffe bombers, returning across the Pennines from a raid in either Liverpool or Manchester, dumped their surplus fuel on the cricket pitch. Gadney was encouraged to paint by his mother, but his early years were entrusted to a German nanny until wartime regulations saw her interned as an "undesirable alien." Gadney attended Dragon School in Oxford and then Stowe in Buckinghamshire before being commissioned as a second lieutenant in the Coldstream Guards in 1960, where he formed a lasting friendship with Simon Parker-Bowles. He was promoted to lieutenant in 1961. Gadney often joked about his time in the army, stating that it was suggested that it would make a man out of him; Gadney always said that it failed to do that.

Whilst in the army, Gadney served in Libya, France and Norway. The latter post saw him working as an attaché and he also qualified as an instructor in winter warfare and Arctic survival. His friendship with Parker-Bowles continued throughout their lives, despite them often not living close to one another. Memorably, on one Changing of the Guard at Buckingham Palace, watched by a temporarily crippled Queen Mother, Gadney gave the wrong order and instead of swapping over guards they all marched away at the same time leaving no guard behind. The commander was apoplectic and gave both Gadney and Parker-Bowles a dressing down, but Gadney and Parker-Bowles later received a message from the Queen Mother that stated "...how terribly nice it was to see the ceremony done differently." Gadney left the active list of the Coldstream Guards in 1962, but remained on the reserve of officers until 1968.

After leaving the army, Gadney attended St Catharine's College, Cambridge and then won a scholarship to the Massachusetts Institute of Technology. He later taught at the Royal College of Art becoming a Fellow and Pro-Rector. He also worked as the deputy controller of the National Film Theatre.

Gadney won a BAFTA in 1983 for his seven-part television serial about John F. Kennedy starring Martin Sheen. In 1989, Gadney's screenplay Goldeneye, a biopic of author Ian Fleming, was shot on location in the Caribbean with Charles Dance playing Fleming. One of Gadney's stipulations was that it should be part filmed in the Caribbean so that he could get a free holiday out of it. It was Dance's suggestion that Gadney play the real-life character of James Bond, who, in the screenplay, Fleming found birdwatching on his Jamaican estate. (Note: In real life, Fleming had met Bond before and owned one of his books, even going so far as writing to Bond to ask his permission to name his fictional spy after the ornithologist.) Fleming took the man's name for his fictional character of James Bond. Gadney used to tell people he was the fifth James Bond who he portrayed between Timothy Dalton and Pierce Brosnan. He also adapted Iris Murdoch's novel The Bell and Minette Walters' novel The Sculptress for television.

He died of pancreatic cancer in early May 2018 and his funeral was held on 22 May 2018 at St Marylebone Parish Church.

== Personal life ==
Gadney was married twice; firstly to Annette Kobak and secondly to the restaurant critic Fay Maschler, whom he met at a party in 1992. He had two children from his first marriage and three step children from his marriage to Maschler.

== Works ==
Gadney became a full-time writer in 1984, but he still painted, especially portraits in his later life, people he knew personally.

=== Screenplays ===
- Forgive Our Foolish Ways (1980)
- The Bell (1982)
- Kennedy (1983)
- Goldeneye (1989)
- Iran; Days of Crisis (1991)
- The Sculptress (1996)

=== Books (fiction) ===
- Drawn Blanc (1970)
- Somewhere in England (1971)
- Seduction of a Tall Man (1972)
- Something worth Fighting For (1974)
- The Cage (1977)
- Just When We are Safest (1995)
- Mother, Son and Holy Ghost (1999)
- The Achilles Heel (1996)
- Strange Police (2000)
- The Scholar of Extortion (2003)
- Immaculate Deception (2006)
- Albert Einstein Speaking (2018)

=== Books (non-fiction) ===
- Cry Hungary! Uprising 1956 (1986)
- Diana: The Final Journey (2007)
