= Groupes de Pamplemousse =

2008 compilation album

Compilation album by Various artists
- Released: February 6, 2008
- Genre: Various
- Label: Jajou Productions
- Producer: Audrey Benoît

Groupes de Pamplemousse is a compilation album released during Suicide Prevention Week in Quebec, Canada. The songs tackle the issue of suicide, and benefits from the album help Suicide Prevention Centres throughout Quebec.

== Track listing ==
1. "Il pleure dans mon cœur", performed by Kate McGarrigle and Martha Wainwright
  (lyrics by Verlaine, music by Rufus Wainwright)
2. "Comme un fou", performed by Le Premier ciel Les Respectables
3. "C'était l'hiver", performed by Les Porn Flakes and Éric Lapointe
4. "Comme un cave", performed by Kaïn
5. "Chu tu seul à soir", performed by Simon J and The Fuckingrüvin Virtual Dumb Band
6. "Chanson d'innocence", performed by Luck and& Pierre Mervil
7. "Le Répondeur", performed by Louis et le Voyageur
8. "Marie-Louise", performed by Loco Locass
9. "Y a tu kelkun?", performed by 3 gars su'l sofa
10. "Chic planète", performed by Gaïa
