= Parrish (film) =

1961 film directed by Delmer Daves

- Theatrical release poster
- Directed by: Delmer Daves
- Written by: Delmer Daves
- Based on: Parrish; 1958 novel by Mildred Savage
- Produced by: Delmer Daves
- Starring: Troy Donahue; Claudette Colbert; Karl Malden; Dean Jagger; Connie Stevens; Diane McBain; Sharon Hugueny
- Cinematography: Harry Stradling Sr.
- Edited by: Owen Marks
- Music by: Max Steiner
- Color process: Technicolor
- Production company: Warner Bros. Pictures
- Distributed by: Warner Bros. Pictures
- Release date: May 4, 1961
- Running time: 138 minutes
- Country: United States
- Language: English
- Budget: $1.5 million
- Box office: $4.2 million (US/Canada rentals)

Parrish is a 1961 American drama film adapted from Mildred Savage's 1958 novel of the same name. Written, produced and directed by Delmer Daves, the film stars Troy Donahue, Claudette Colbert (in her final theatrical film role), Karl Malden, Dean Jagger, Connie Stevens, Diane McBain, Sharon Hugueny, Sylvia Miles, Madeleine Sherwood and Hayden Rorke.

== Plot ==
Parrish McLean and his widowed mother Ellen arrive at Sala Post's tobacco plantation in Connecticut, where Ellen has been hired to chaperon Sala's daughter, Alison. Sala however refuses to let Parrish live with him, thus Parrish is forced to leave. He is soon hired to work in Sala's tobacco fields, and moves in with fellow crop worker Teet Howie, who lives with his wife's family.

Parrish falls for Lucy, one of the field hands, but she is reluctantly seeing someone else. Back on the plantation, Parrish works over night to replant new tobacco after wireworms devastate a tobacco field. He then goes to see his mother, where he meets and falls in love with Alison. While Parrish is transporting seedbeds, he converses with Paige, the daughter of Judd Raike, a rival businessman. Paige reports the news to her father and her two brothers, Edgar and Wiley, who believe Sala will be forced to sell the field.

Impressed with Parrish's diligence, Sala allows him to move in with Ellen. Parrish does not move in immediately, which upsets Alison, who then dates Wiley. Judd arrives at Sala's residence, where Ellen greets him, but Sala refuses to sell the field to him. Ellen later chaperones Alison at a hotel, where she writes to Parrish that she and Judd are dating. Parrish resents their relationship when he learns about Judd's past history. Nevertheless, Ellen marries Judd.

After the wedding, Parrish returns to the field, where Lucy tells him she is pregnant. Later that night, Alison invites Parrish to see her tomorrow night. Parrish however declines as he plans to attend a harvest party with Lucy. Upset at his rejection, Alison expresses her contempt for Parrish. By winter time, Lucy has given birth to a son, to which Parrish learns Edgar is the father.

The Raikes host a Christmas party, where Parrish uses Edgar's paternity to blackmail him into warmly accepting Ellen as his new stepmother. Parrish accepts a job for his stepfather as a field checker and report the field conditions back to Judd every night. After a while, Judd is furious when one tobacco field has been infected with blue mold, which went unnoticed by Parrish.

Meanwhile, Judd pushes Edgar to acquire a tobacco field from Tully, a farmer, who refuses to sell. One night, while Parrish checks the fields, Edgar burns Tully's field. The next morning, Parrish, repulsed by his stepfather's business tactics, quits his job and joins the U.S. Navy. Alison refuses to wait for Parrish and marries Wiley.

For the next two years, Parrish and Paige correspond through letters. Parrish leaves the Navy and volunteers to work for Sala, who has given up trying to fight Judd. The field hands who worked for Sala have since left. Instead, Sala leases 20 acres (8.1 ha) of land to Parrish, on the condition he hires field hands to work for him. Parrish is unable to hire field hands as they fear reprisals from Judd. Paige then enlists her classmates to work weekends in the fields.

Over time, Teet and Lucy return. Infuriated by Parrish's defiance, Edgar tries to set fire to his fields. Parrish puts out the fire and fights Edgar into submission as the field hands watch. Judd watches by without raising a hand to protect his son, and when Edgar returns, he drives off. Parrish, respected by his field hands, returns to grow tobacco with Paige at his side.

== Cast ==
- Troy Donahue as Parrish McLean
- Claudette Colbert as Ellen McLean
- Karl Malden as Judd Raike
- Dean Jagger as Sala Post
- Connie Stevens as Lucy
- Diane McBain as Alison Post
- Sharon Hugueny as Paige Raike
- Dub Taylor as Teet Howie
- Hampton Fancher as Edgar Raike
- David Knapp as Wiley Raike
- Saundra Edwards as Evaline Raike
- Sylvia Miles as Eileen
- Bibi Osterwald as Rosie
- Madeleine Sherwood as Addie
- Hayden Rorke as Tom Weldon

Other notable appearances include Frank Campanella as Foreman, Terry Carter as Cartwright, Don Dillaway as Max Maine, Gertrude Flynn as Miss Daly, Vincent Gardenia in a bit part, House Jameson as Oermeyer, and Carroll O'Connor as Firechief.

== Production ==
By May 1958, Warner Bros. had bought the film rights to Mildred Savage's novel even before it was published, for a figure reported to be between $160,000 and $200,000. When the novel was published later in October, Edmund Fuller of The New York Times called it an "impressive debut".

Joshua Logan was initially hired to direct the film, with John Patrick to write the script. Clark Gable was mentioned as a possible male lead. A nationwide talent search was launched to cast the title role. By March 1959, Anthony Perkins and Natalie Wood was announced as potential lead roles. Delmer Daves then became involved as director, which saw Troy Donahue cast in the lead role.

Parts of the movie were shot in East Windsor and Poquonock (Windsor), Connecticut. Mildred Savage, on whose novel the film was based, was a frequent visitor to the set. She was quoted during filming as saying:

My central theme — and fortunately Mr. Daves agrees about this — is that young people today are neither "beat" or "lost". I wanted to show an affirmative hero who may be confused because of his youth and sex troubles, but who is still masculine, unaffected and optimistic — able to get ahead on his own two feet. The idea of setting this story in the tobacco industry came last. It seemed sensible to put a vigorous, healthy young man to work in the soil.

Delmer Daves differentiated the film from his earlier A Summer Place:

There I tried to dramatize the terrible end of communication between parents and children. Here, in this day of mass identification, I show the need for a young man to establish his individual liberty against the world's increasing push towards conformity.

It was Claudette Colbert's first film in six years. "I didn't really intend to make another picture", she admitted at the time. "I took this one because I felt it had a point of view. The mother wants to break the silver cord and lead a normal sex life of her own."

"Working with these kids is a little tough sometimes", said Karl Malden of the film's youthful cast. "Still, they're eager and they're learning. And we can always do retakes if something goes wrong."

== Soundtrack ==
Max Steiner composed the film score. On this film he made use of his belief that "every character should have a theme." The Warner Bros. Records soundtrack (WS-1413) recording used five of the film's main themes in both a short version and a concerto versions. In addition to the "Tobacco Theme", (for tobacco heir Parrish McLean), "Paige's Theme", "Allison's Theme", "Lucy's Theme", and "Ellen's Theme;" the soundtrack included Steiner's song "Someday I'll Meet You Again" (from Passage to Marseille). Max Steiner conducted the Warner Bros. Orchestra. Side 2 of the soundtrack album featured George Greeley as guest pianist, playing three of the film themes, together with two other Steiner film themes, Tara's Theme (from Gone With The Wind) and the Theme from A Summer Place. George Greeley was also featured on several singles issued by Warner Brothers.

== Reception ==
Bosley Crowther of The New York Times dismissed the characters as "artificial people, these romantically exaggerated folks who sweep through this status-conscious story, which is sufficiently exaggerated in itself—from the bird-brained and unbucolic hero to the meanest farm-girl with the low-cut blouse. Not one of them is representative of credible humanity."

Harrison's Reports called the film "Very good" and felt it "has all the "chemistry" of a hit, despite its soap opera story line. There's plenty of romance (Parrish is involved with three young women; his mother with a local tycoon), suspense, action and local color. Lacking is comic relief."

Larry Tubelle of Variety wrote the film is "a long, plodding account of man vs. monopoly in Connecticut's tobacco game. Although slickly produced, charming to the eye in its pictorial appreciation of New England's scenic beauty and carefully cast with a mixture of solid veteran troupers and a host of pretty, mostly blue-eyed colts and fillies weaned in Warner Bros. television-indoctrinated stable, the film, for all its length, rarely gets beneath the skin of its characters and eventually begins to sag under the bulk of too many climaxes and followed by too many dramatic plateaus."

Time magazine wrote the film "is supposed to prove that 'our youth is neither beat nor lost.' Instead, as represented by some featherweight personalities out of Warner’s TV training camp, American youth is merely sullen, sadistic and sex-obsessed."

A 1965 New York Times article listed Parrish among other films as "pure camp".

In 1967, Donahue described the film as the most satisfying of his movies to date. "I had the best script and the best opportunity as an actor", he said. "Not too many of those came my way."

== See also ==
- List of American films of 1961
