= Parrish (novel) =

1958 novel by Mildred Savage

- Author: Mildred Savage
- Language: English
- Publisher: Simon & Schuster
- Publication date: 1958
- Publication place: United States
- Media type: Print (hardback & paperback)

Parrish is the 1958 debut novel by Mildred Savage. The novel was originally published in hardback by Simon & Schuster in 1958. The novel is a bildungsroman of a young man, the titular Parrish Maclean, as he works his way out of the grueling work in Connecticut River Valley tobacco fields during the 1940s and 1950s. The novel was adapted into a 1961 film, which starred Troy Donahue as the title character as well as Claudette Colbert and Karl Malden.

The contemporary review in The New York Times called the novel "an impressive debut," comparing the novel to Edna Ferber's Giant.
