= Fay Maschler =

British journalist (born 1945)

Fay Maschler MBE
- Born: Fay Goldie Coventry; 15 July 1945 (age 80); British India
- Spouses: Tom Maschler (m. 1970; div. 1987) Reg Gadney (m. 1992; died 2018)

Fay Goldie Maschler MBE (née Coventry; 15 July 1945) is a British journalist who was the restaurant critic of London's Evening Standard newspaper for nearly 50 years. She won a contest for the position in 1972, when her tenure was supposed to last for three months. In December 2020, the Evening Standard announced that Maschler would leave the role of its chief restaurant critic after 48 years, to be succeeded by Jimi Famurewa, but would continue as a contributor. She was subsequently appointed restaurant critic of Tatler magazine.

Maschler was born in British India and moved to Surrey, England in 1947. When she was 12, her family moved to Old Greenwich, Connecticut, where she learned to cook. She was married to the publisher Tom Maschler from 1970 to 1987. She was latterly married to Reg Gadney, the thriller writer and painter; he died in early May 2018. She and Tom Maschler had three children, Ben, Hannah and Alice; they were divorced in 1987 and he died in 2020.

In 2004, Maschler was awarded an MBE for services to journalism. Two photographic portraits of Maschler are held in the collection of the National Portrait Gallery, London.
