= Kaïn =

Canadian folk rock group

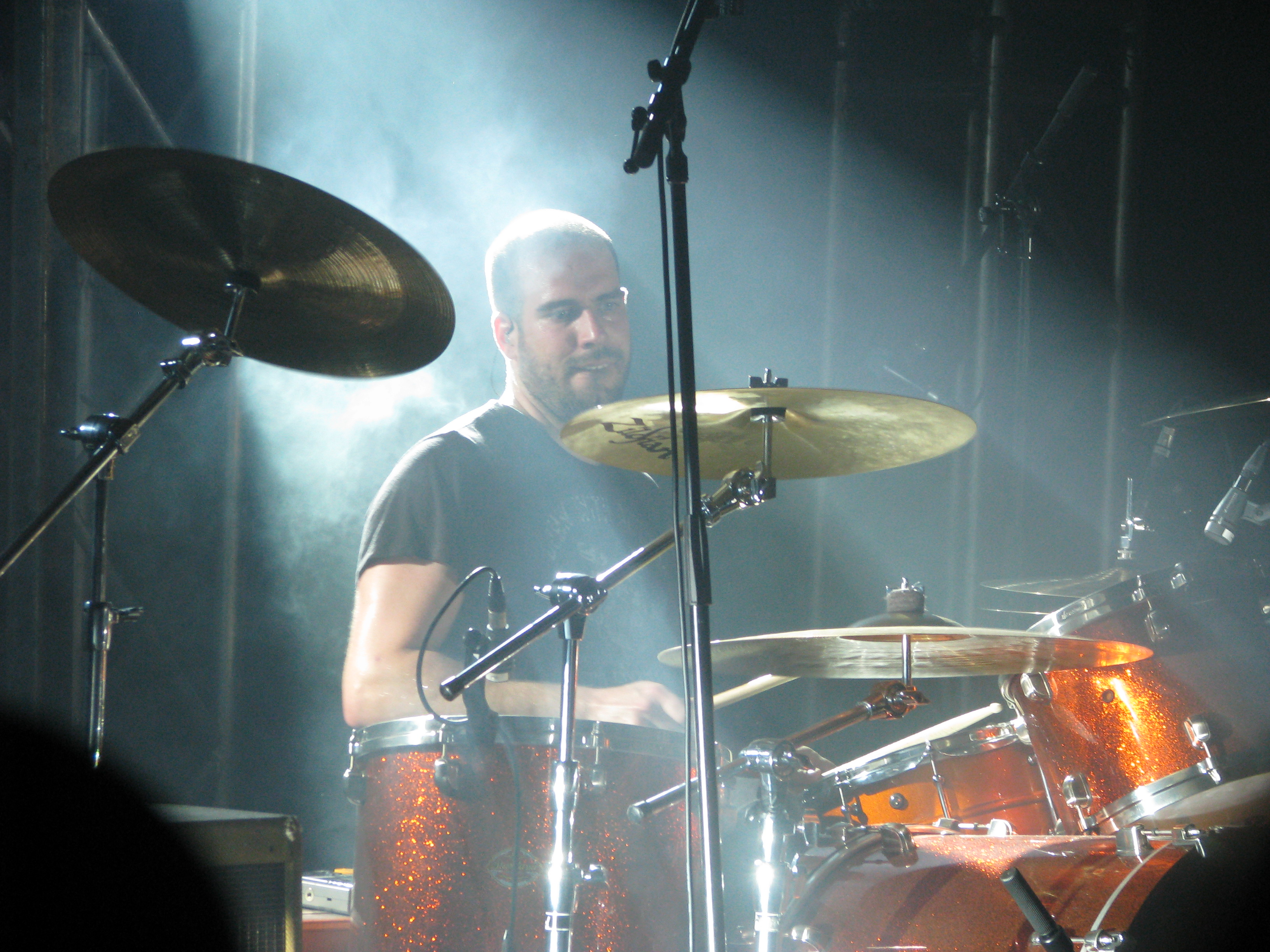
- Kaïn performing in 2008

Background information
- Origin: Drummondville, Quebec, Canada
- Genres: Folk rock
- Years active: 1999–present)
- Label: Les Disques Passeport
- Awards: ADISQ – Best group 2006; SOCAN – Most played song 2006 "Mexico", "Comme dans le Temps"
- Members: Steve Veilleux; Éric Maheu; John-Anthony Gagnon-Robinette
- Past members: Pascal Tessier; Yannick Blanchette; Patrick Lemieux
- Website: kain.ca

Kaïn is a folk rock group from Drummondville, Quebec, Canada. The group of four is made up of Steve Veilleux (vocals, electric, and acoustic guitar), Yannick Blanchette (drums and vocals), Patrick Lemieux (electric and acoustic guitar, banjo, harmonica, and vocals), and Éric Maheu (bass guitar). Their style is a blend of rock and roll with Quebec folk music.

== History ==
The group formed in 1999. The founding members were Veilleux, Planchette, Lemieux, and guitarist Pascal Tessier. They first signed a contract with Les Disques Passeport in 2003. They released their first album, Pop Culture, in 2004 from the recording company Les Disques Passeport, a small company in Montreal, Quebec.

The band's second album, Nulle part ailleurs, was released in 2005. Tessier left the band at about this time and bassist Éric Maheu joined. The album spent over 100 weeks in the top twenty in the francophone top 100 chart.

After the band's fourth album, Le Vrai Monde, was released in 2011, the band went on a tour of festivals and theatres.

== Members ==
Veilleux, whose father played the accordion and the violin, himself started playing guitar and writing music at a young age. Blanchette also came from a family of musicians; he had in 1990 co-founded the metal music band Subversion. Lemieux studied blues and rock music at Cégep in Drummondville. Maheu, formerly of the band La Chicane, started with a solo career, and recorded commercials for Burger King.

== Discography ==
=== Studio albums ===
- 2004: Pop Culture
- 2005: Nulle part ailleurs
- 2007: Les saisons s'tassent No. 3 CAN
- 2011: Le vrai monde No. 7 CAN
- 2013: Pleurer pour rire No. 15 CAN
- 2017: Welcome bonheur No. 22 CAN
- 2019: Je viens d'ici - 20 years anniversary album - Label; Disques Musicor - Released; Octobre 4, 2019
- 2023: EL GRANDE TORPEDO

=== DVDs ===
- 2006: On Dormira Demain

=== Singles ===
- 2003: "Parle-moi d'toi"
- 2004: "Comme une étoile"
- 2004: "Autour de l'ombre"
- 2005: "Embarque ma belle"
- 2006: "Adam et Ève"
- 2006: "Comme dans le temps"
- 2006: "Mexico"
- 2007: "L'amour du jour"
- 2008: "On dormira demain"
- 2008: "La maison est grande"

=== Other contributions ===
- 2008: Groupes de Pamplemousse - "Comme un cave"

== Awards ==
- Best group at the 2006 ADISQ awards.
- Received two SOCAN awards in 2006 for the songs "Mexico" and "Comme dans le Temps" in the category of most played.
