= James Bond: The Authorized Biography of 007 =

1973 biography by John Pearson

James Bond: The Authorized Biography
- First edition cover
- Author: John Pearson
- Cover artist: Bartholomew Wilkins and Partners (Sidgwick & Jackson ed.)
- Language: English
- Series: James Bond
- Genre: Biography, Spy novel
- Publisher: Sidgwick & Jackson
- Publication date: 1973
- Publication place: United Kingdom
- Media type: Print (Hardcover and Paperback)
- Pages: 317 pp (first edition, hardback)
- ISBN: 0-283-97946-1 (first edition, hardback)
- OCLC: 2736297
- Dewey Decimal: 823/.9/14
- LC Class: PZ4.P36247 Jam PR6066.E2

James Bond: The Authorized Biography of 007 (laterJames Bond: The Authorised Biography) by John Pearson, is a fictional biography of James Bond, first published in 1973; Pearson also wrote the biography The Life of Ian Fleming (1966).

The Authorized Biography of 007 was not commissioned by Glidrose Publications. It originated as a spoof novel for publisher Sidgwick & Jackson. However, Pearson knew Peter Janson-Smith, the Glidrose chairman, who gave permission for the work to be published. Consequently, this is the only James Bond book from Glidrose, between 1953 and 1987, not first published by Jonathan Cape, additionally, it is the only Bond novel with a shared copyright credit; Pearson is the only Bond novelist so recognised.

== Plot summary ==
The premise of James Bond: The Authorized Biography of 007 is that James Bond is based upon a real MI6 agent. Ian Fleming hinted so in You Only Live Twice, in Bond's obituary, that his adventures were the basis of a series of "sensational novels"; illustrating this contention, that novel's comic strip adaptation used covers from Fleming's James Bond novels.

Writing autobiographically, Pearson begins the story with his own recruitment to MI6 and meeting Sir William Stephenson and a fifty-something Bond in Bermuda. Already, the department had assigned Ian Fleming to write novels based upon the real agent; Fleming was to be truthful about the agent's adventures. The idea was to hide the truth, of Bond's exploits, in plain sight; along the way, Fleming created fictional tales, such as Moonraker, to keep the Soviets guessing what was fact and what was not. Pearson's also incorporates Fleming's flippant claim to not having written The Spy Who Loved Me, but that Vivienne Michel mysteriously sent him the manuscript.

Based upon the success of his Fleming biography, The Life of Ian Fleming (1966), MI6 instruct Pearson to write 007's biography; he is introduced to a retired James Bond – who is in his fifties, yet healthy, sun-tanned, and married to Honeychile Ryder, the heroine of Dr. No. Most of James Bond: The Authorized Biography of 007 is Bond telling his life story, including school and first MI6 missions, referring to most every novel and short story and, briefly, to Colonel Sun, the Robert Markham series-continuation novel. At conclusion, as Bond rushes to another mission (contrary to mandatory retirement), John Pearson is invited to assume Ian Fleming's scribal duties, like Dr. John Watson assumed with Sherlock Holmes.

== Publication history ==
- UK first hardback edition: 1973 Sidgwick & Jackson
- U.S. first hardback edition: 1974 William Morrow & Company
- UK first paperback edition: 1975 Pan Books
- U.S. first paperback edition: March 1975 Pyramid Books
- UK hardcover reprint: 1985 Granada
- UK paperback reprint: 1986 Grafton
- U.S. paperback reprint: 1986 Grove Press
- UK paperback reprint: 2023 Ian Fleming Publications

Out of print since the 1990s, a reprinting of the book was released in 2008. The reprint shortens the book's title to James Bond: The Authorised Biography.

== Reception ==
The novel's canonical status as biography is debatable. Some fans consider it canon with Ian Fleming's James Bond novel series, while other aficionados consider it apocryphal. Elements of the biography are contradicted by "official" Bond fiction, notably Charlie Higson's Young Bond series, which suggests that James Bond was born in Switzerland, as opposed to Pearson's suggestion that Bond was born in Wattenscheid, Germany. Unlike the later Bond novels by John Gardner and Raymond Benson, which are not of (although still based upon) Fleming's continuity, such is not the case with Pearson's book, along with the continuation novel Colonel Sun, by Kingsley Amis, (to which Pearson refers). As those books occur in the same time as Fleming's Bond novels, their being canonical with Fleming's books is debatable, yet Pan Books, one British publisher of Bond novels, includes Pearson's book, James Bond: The Authorized Biography of 007, as an official series entry of their first paperback edition series.

== See also ==
- Outline of James Bond
