= Paul Eddy =

British investigative journalist and author

- Born: c. 1944–1945
- Died: 10 December 2009 (aged 64)
- Occupations: Journalist, author
- Employer: The Sunday Times
- Known for: Investigative journalism; Insight Team

Paul Eddy (c. 1944–1945 – 10 December 2009) was a British investigative journalist and author, best known for his work with the Sunday Times Insight Team. He specialised in reporting on espionage, terrorism, organised crime, and major disasters, and was regarded as one of the leading investigative reporters of his generation.

== Early life and career ==
Eddy left school at the age of 15 and began his journalism career on the Leamington Morning News. He later worked for a news agency in East London before establishing his own agency in the West Midlands.

His early reporting included tracking down former Secretary of State for War John Profumo following the Profumo affair, which helped him secure work with the Sunday Mirror. He also worked for the Associated Press bureau in Athens before joining The Sunday Times in 1971.

== Sunday Times and Insight Team ==
Eddy became a prominent member – and later leader – of the Sunday Times Insight Team, which was known for high-profile exposés and in-depth reporting. His work covered a wide range of subjects, including intelligence operations, political corruption, terrorism, and major disasters. Among his notable investigations were reporting on Israeli interrogation practices in 1977 and detailed analysis of the Brighton hotel bombing in 1984.

== Writing career ==
Eddy co-authored several non-fiction books on international conflict, espionage, and organised crime, including works on the global cocaine trade and the Falklands War. After leaving full-time staff work at The Sunday Times in 1985, he continued contributing to the paper and expanded into fiction writing. He authored a series of detective novels featuring the fictional police officer Grace Flint.

== Later life and death ==
Eddy later lived in Ménerbes, France, with his third wife. He suffered an aneurysm that severely affected his memory before his death in December 2009 at the age of 64.
