= Manifestif =

Studio album by Loco Locass
- Released: December 1999; October 24, 2000 (Re-release)
- Genre: Rap
- Length: 72:07
- Language: French
- Label: Audiogram (Canada); ADCD10139 (CD)

Loco Locass chronology
Manifestif (1999)	In Vivo (EP) (2003)

Manifestif
- First Release

Singles from Manifestif
- 1. "Sheila, ch'us là" Released: October 2002

Professional ratings
Review scores
Source	Rating
Voir	link

Manifestif is an album by Loco Locass.

== Track listing ==
1. "Mes enfants..." 1:15
2. "L'assaut" 2:07
3. "Sheila, ch'us là" 4:33
4. "Langage-toi" 5:33
5. "L'empire du pire en pire" 4:37
6. "Malamalangue" 4:45
7. "Potsotjob" Koubraüss 5:08
8. "Impression solennel levant" 5:21
9. "Boom Baby Boom!" 6:22
10. "Isabeille et Biz" 3:47
11. "Manifestif" 4:55
12. "La casse du 24" 2:14
13. "Priapée la p'tite vite" 2:10
14. "Médiatribes" 5:39
15. "Art poétik" 3:46
16. "I represent rien pantoute" 6:33
17. "Vulgus vs Sanctus" 5:57
