= Nathan Masters =

US historian and writer

Nathan Masters (born 1981) is an author and the host of Lost L.A., a public television series about Los Angeles history. He manages public programs at the University of Southern California Libraries. In 2013, he launched a Gizmodo subdomain titled Southland about Los Angeles history and geography. Masters grew up in Orange County, California.

He has hosted the public television series Lost L.A. since its conception in 2016 and has also served as a producer. The series, originally based on a series of articles he wrote for KCET, has won multiple awards, including four Los Angeles Area Emmys and a Golden Mike.

In 2019, the digital magazine Truly*Adventurous published his article "Pillars of Fire" about Los Angeles policewoman Alice Stebbins Wells and cult leader Alma Bridwell White. Amazon Studios subsequently acquired the story, with Rachel Brosnahan attached. Masters published later another story with Truly*Adventurous about Soviet spy and FBI counterspy Boris Morros.

On 21 March 2023 he published his first book, titled Crooked: The Roaring '20s Tale of a Corrupt Attorney General, a Crusading Senator, and the Birth of the American Political Scandal, about the Teapot Dome scandal and Sen. Burton K. Wheeler's investigation of Attorney Gen. Harry Daugherty. The book won the Edgar Allan Poe Award for Best Fact Crime from the Mystery Writers of America. Kirkus described it as "an impressive book debut with a brisk, lively history of a political scandal, 'one of those Roaring Twenties spectacles...that held the entire nation spellbound.'" The Wall Street Journal wrote that it had "all the makings of a great film plot, complete with theatrical witnesses, twists, turns and a conclusive, if slightly maddening ending." Masters started working on the book in 2019, and his research encompassed more than 3,000 pages of congressional transcripts, Justice Department records at the National Archives, and Freedom of Information Act requests from the Federal Bureau of Investigation.
