= Marcy Blum =

American author, event planner, and owner

- Education: The Culinary Institute of America
- Occupations: Author; Event planner

Marcy Blum is an American author, event planner, and owner of Marcy Blum Associates in New York City.

== Education ==
Blum is a graduate of The Culinary Institute of America and began her career in the restaurant business, later creating a segue into the then-developing field of event planning. In 1986 she became one of the first in the industry to develop the vocation into a successful career

== Career ==
Marcy Blum has been named one of the top wedding planners in the world by Vogue Magazine, Harper's Bazaar, and Martha Stewart Weddings. New York magazine described Blum as a "desired wedding planner to the wealthy and famous."

Among her clients are Rickie Fowler and Allison Stokke, Billy Joel, Kevin Bacon and Kyra Sedgwick, Salman Rushdie and Padma Lakshmi, Katie Lee Joel, Colin Hanks and Samantha Bryant, Lebron James and Savannah James, Fabiola Beracasa Beckman and Jason Beckman, and George Soros and Tamiko Soros, The Rockefeller family, Nate Berkus and Jeremiah Brent, Annie Lawless and Jeffrey Jacobs, and Andre Iguodala and Christina Iguodala. She was also the planner of The Knot's "Dream Wedding" in 2014 of Boston Marathon bombing survivors, Rebekah Gregory and Pete DiMartino.

Blum has been a guest on the CBS Morning Show, The Today Show, Live with Regis and Kelly, The Oprah Winfrey Show, Rachael Ray Show and The Nate Berkus Show.

Blum has written and contributed to many articles, including The New York Times, New York magazine, The Knot, Brides magazine, Elle, Modern Bride, InStyle, and Town & Country. She coauthored, with Laura Kaiser, two books, Wedding Planning for Dummies and Wedding Kit for Dummies.

In 2018, Marcy Blum was named a 'Tastemaker' for HomeGoods.

== Personal ==
Marcy is the sister of American author and journalist Howard Blum.
