= Goldeneye (1989 film) =

Film about Ian Fleming by Don Boyd

- Based on: Biography by John Pearson about life of Ian Fleming
- Written by: Reg Gadney
- Directed by: Don Boyd
- Starring: Charles Dance
- Music by: Michael Berkeley
- Country of origin: United Kingdom
- Original language: English

Production
- Producer: Graeme MacDonald
- Cinematography: Richard Greatrex
- Editor: David Spiers
- Running time: 105 minutes
- Production company: Anglia Films

Original release
- Network: ITV
- Release: 27 August 1989

Goldeneye, also sometimes called Goldeneye: The Secret Life of Ian Fleming, is a 1989 British television film loosely based on the life of the author Ian Fleming, portrayed by Charles Dance, focusing on Fleming's life during the Second World War, his love life and the writing of James Bond, and directed by Don Boyd. The film is based on The Life of Ian Fleming (1966), a biography by John Pearson, who was Fleming's assistant in the 1950s and has access to his private papers. The film's screenwriter, Reg Gadney, also has a small part as James Bond, the American ornithologist who lent his name to Fleming's famous spy.

The Anglia Television's dramatised biography takes its name from Fleming's estate in Jamaica (the title was later used for the James Bond film). The film received mixed reviews, with praise for Dance's portrayal of Fleming.

== Cast ==
- Charles Dance as Ian Fleming
- Phyllis Logan as Ann Fleming
- Patrick Ryecart as Ivar Bryce
- Marsha Fitzalan as Loelia
- Ed Devereaux as Sir William Stephenson
- Julian Fellowes as Noël Coward
- Lynsey Baxter as Wren Lieutenant
- Donald Hewlett as Admiral Godfrey
- Richard Griffiths as Second Admiral
- Joseph Long as Lucky Luciano
- Donald Douglas as Lord Kemsley
- David Quilter as Lord Rothermere
- Freda Dowie as Harley Street doctor
- Christoph Waltz as German spy
- Lisa Daniely as Wren Captain
- Reg Gadney as James Bond
- Steve Plytas as Dragoumis
- Kim Kindersley as Royal Navy Lieutenant
- Deborah Moore as Secretary
- Philip O'Brien as CBS Interviewer
- Adrian Edmondson as ADC to Admiral
