= Loco Locass =

Canadian hip hop group

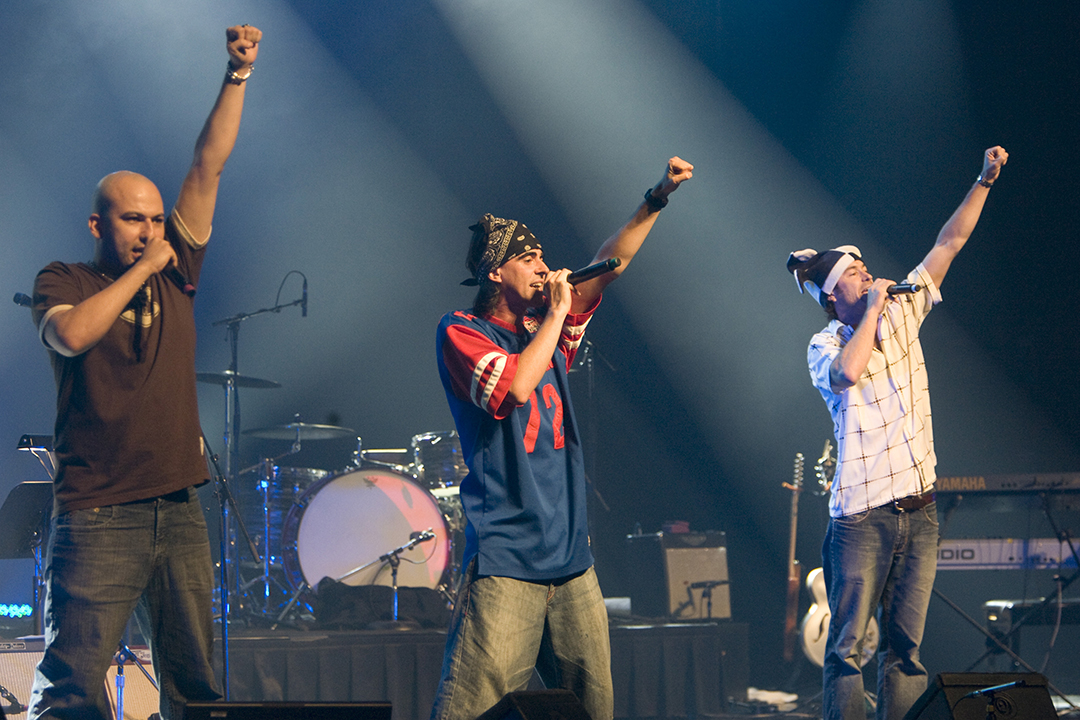
- The three members of the band in concert at Francofolies 2011

Background information
- Origin: Quebec, Canada
- Genres: Hip-hop
- Years active: 1995–2026
- Label: Audiogram
- Past members: Biz (Sébastien Fréchette); Batlam (Sébastien Ricard); Chafiik (Mathieu Farhoud-Dionne)
- Website: locolocass.net

Loco Locass was a Canadian hip hop group from Quebec formed in 1995. The group often defended the role of the French language, and championed Quebec sovereignty. Songs such as "ROC Rap" and "Résistance" highlighted the band's political leanings, and their strong advocacy for Quebec to be an independent country. Their song "Le But" was previously used as the goal song of the Montreal Canadiens and was played after every goal the Canadiens scored at the Bell Centre until the start of the 2017–18 NHL Season. "Le But" was recently brought back as the Canadiens' victory song.

== Beginnings ==
In 1999, the band adopted the name 'Locos Locass' and then changed it to 'Loco Locass', also adding new band member Chafiik (Mathieu Farhoud-Dionne). The band musicians besides the trio of Biz, Batlam and Chafiik are Jeanse, Djip, Lester G, VöV, and Tchi Tchi Novo Solmol

== Criticism and controversy ==
Loco Locass's self-image as a vehicle for promoting the sovereigntist option has played into existing social divisions. These divisions have played out on several occasions:

St-Jean Concert: on June 24, 2005, the group took part in a show marking the government-designated Quebec National Holiday organised by Les Cowboys Fringants at Montréal's Parc Jean-Drapeau. The ten-hour politicized show's $40 entry fee was controversial, as was its sponsorship by Coca-Cola and Gillette, companies some left-wing nationalists identified as "Anglo-Saxon imperialists", leading to charges that the show constituted elitist competition with a long-established event at Parc Maisonneuve.

Federal Funding: Loco Locass are not among the sovereigntist artists whose political stance leads them to boycott federal funding programmes. In particular, some of their recordings have received federal recording industry subsidies. Federalists have charged that this poses an integrity problem, since they accept funding from the very level of government whose rejection they seek to promote.

Federalists Leave Home: Biz was reported during the spring of 2006 as suggesting that those who do not support the sovereignty option should leave Quebec. Some also accuse Biz's of taking part of the history of accusations of disloyalty by nationalists.

== Activism ==
On February 25, 2010, Chafiik of Loco Locass signed, together with 500 other artists, a call to support the international campaign for Boycott, Divestment and Sanctions against Israeli apartheid.

== Documentary ==
On August 19, 2005, in Rivière-du-Loup, Quebec, Loco Locass played five of their songs accompanied by a young string orchestra of musicians aged 12 to 17, an initiative of Camp Musical St-Alexandre director-conductor Mathieu Rivest. The five songs were "La censure pour l'échafaud", "La bataille des murailles", "L'empire du pire en pire", "Antiaméricanisme primaire", and "Libérez-nous des libéraux", to which music by Prokofiev, Berlioz, and Stravinsky was added. Partners included Télé-Québec, Vidéo Femmes and Audiogram, and a documentary entitled Symphonie Locass was released in the winter of 2006.

== Awards ==
Loco Locass won awards from:

- ADISQ (best hip-hop album for Amour Oral, 2005);
- CRIA-certified gold album for selling 50,000 copies of Amour Oral (2005);
- MuchMusic Video Awards (nominated for best French-language video, 2005);
- MusiquePlus (artist of the month, April 2005).

== Discography ==
- Manifestif (2000)
- In Vivo (EP) (2003)
- Amour Oral (2004)
- Le Québec est mort, Vive le Québec ! (2012) #4 CAN

=== Other contributions ===
- Malajube (2006) – "La russe"
- Groupes de Pamplemousse (2008) – "Marie-Louise"
- Le But (Allez Montréal), the goal song for the Montreal Canadiens from 2013 to 2017. Victory song 2018 to present

== Videos ==
- Sheila Chu la (2002)
- Groove Grave (2005)
- Bonzaion (2005)
- Spleen & Montreal (2006)
- La bataille des murailles en symphonique (2006)
- La censure pour l'échafaud (2006)
- La Paix des Braves (featuring Samian) (2007)
- M'accrocher (2008)
- Hymne à Québec (2010)
- Le But (2010)
