= Lost L.A. =

- Genre: History; Documentary
- Directed by: Matt Bass (2019-2026)
- Presented by: Nathan Masters
- Country of origin: United States
- Original language: English
- No. of seasons: 8
- No. of episodes: 41

Production
- Executive producers: Matthew Crotty (2016-2022); Juan Devis (2018-2022); Tamara Gould (2024-2026); Nathan Masters (2018-2026); Hugh McHarg (2016-2017); Catherine A. Quinlan (2016-2017)
- Producer: Angela Boisvert (2019-2026)
- Cinematography: Matt Bass (2019-2026)
- Running time: 21–27 minutes
- Production companies: PBS SoCal (previously known as KCET); USC Libraries; Nonetheless Productions (2017); Rigler Creative (2018)

Original release
- Network: KCET, PBS SoCal
- Release: January 27, 2016 – present

Lost LA is a public television historical documentary series that explores Southern California's hidden past through documents, photos, and other rare artifacts from the region's libraries and archives.

Hosted by writer and historian Nathan Masters, each episode of Lost LA explores a different aspect of Los Angeles history.

The half-hour series is co-produced by KCET and USC Libraries and is broadcast by KCET, PBS SoCal and other public television stations.

== Development ==
The show began as a series of online articles that featured historical materials from the L.A. archives. When the online series became successful, it was spun off into its own TV series.

== Funders ==
Lost LA is made possible by Anne Ray Foundation, a Margaret A. Cargill Philanthropy; The Ralph M. Parsons Foundation; and the California State Library.

== Plot ==
Los Angeles is often thought of as a city without a history, an instant metropolis defined by the glitz and glamour of the entertainment industry. Lost LA challenges these stereotypes, offering a history of Southern California not found in other media. Unlike other history shows which only look backward at antiquarian arcana, Lost LA explains the Southern California of today and how we got here.

== Cast and characters ==
Historian Nathan Masters has hosted the series since its inception. Los Angeles City Archivist Michael Holland has also appeared in several episodes. Other frequent guests include journalist Gustavo Arellano and historians Eric Avila, William Deverell, and D.J. Waldie.

== Awards ==
The series has been honored with numerous awards, including seven Los Angeles Area Emmy Awards; the Los Angeles Press Club's SoCal Journalism Award; the Los Angeles Press Club's National Arts & Entertainment Journalism Award; and the Radio and Television News Association (RTNA) of Southern California's Golden Mike Award.

== Episodes ==
=== Season 1 (Premiered January 27, 2016) ===
No. overall	No. in season	Title	Directed by	Original release date
1	1	"Wild L.A."	Laura Purdy, Sara Joe Wolansky	January 27, 2016
2	2	"Before the Dodgers"	Javier Barboza, Amy Lee Ketchum, Ben Sax	February 3, 2016
3	3	"Reshaping L.A."	Matt Glass, Jordan Wayne Long, Kelly Parker	February 10, 2016

=== Special Summer Episode (2017) ===
No. overall	No. in season	Title	Directed by	Original release date
4	1	"Descanso Gardens"	Christopher Stoudt	July 26, 2017

=== Season 2 (Premiered October 10, 2017) ===
No. overall	No. in season	Title	Directed by	Original release date
5	1	"Borderlands"	Elia Urquiza	October 10, 2017
6	2	"Wild West"	Andrew Ahn, Giulia Caruso, Logan Kibens, Ki Jin Kim	October 17, 2017
7	3	"Building the Metropolis"	Logan Kibens, Norbert Shieh, Elia Urquiza	October 24, 2017
8	4	"Dream Factory"	Logan Kibens, Ki Jin Kim	November 7, 2017
9	5	"Coded Geographies"	Adebukola Bodunrin, Logan Kibens	November 14, 2017
10	6	"Pacific Rim"	Ki Jin Kim	November 21, 2017

=== Season 3 (Premiered October 9, 2018) ===
No. overall	No. in season	Title	Directed by	Original release date
11	1	"Yosemite"	Thomas Rigler	October 9, 2018
12	2	"Desert Fantasy"	Thomas Rigler	October 16, 2018
13	3	"Beach Culture"	Thomas Rigler	October 23, 2018
14	4	"Ghost Towns"	Thomas Rigler	October 30, 2018
15	5	"Venice"	Thomas Rigler	November 13, 2018
16	6	"Fantasyland"	Thomas Rigler	November 27, 2018

=== Season 4 (Premiered October 15, 2019) ===
No. overall	No. in season	Title	Directed by	Original release date
17	1	"Griffith Park"	Matt Bass	October 15, 2019
At more than 4,500 acres, Griffith Park is one of the largest municipal parks in the United States. Its founder, the controversial and complicated Griffith J. Griffith, donated the land to the city as a public recreation ground for all the people—an ideal that has been challenged over the years. In this episode, featuring hiker and author Casey Schreiner, viewers visit a Mexican-era adobe within the park boundaries and ride the historic Merry-go-Round, where Griffith's ideal of equal access was challenged.
18	2	"Three Views of Manzanar"	Matt Bass	October 22, 2019
Despite the psychological trauma of their incarceration during World War II, Japanese Americans built new lives while detained at concentration camps like Manzanar. They played baseball, planted gardens and made the honor roll. Three renowned photographers captured these scenes: outsiders Dorothea Lange and Ansel Adams, and incarceree Tōyō Miyatake, who boldly smuggled in a camera lens to document life from within the camp. All three trained their lenses on small yet profound moments of dignity and domesticity, documenting resilience in the face of civil injustice. This episode compares and contrasts their approaches and politics in their work.
19	3	"Bootlegger Tunnels"	Matt Bass	October 29, 2019
Prohibition in the United States may have outlawed liquor, but that didn't mean the booze stopped flowing. How did Angelenos keep their glasses half full in these dry times? In this episode, viewers explore the myths of subterranean Los Angeles, crawl through prohibition-era tunnels, and visit some of the city's oldest speakeasies. This episode features visits to Cole's Pacific Electric Buffet and The King Eddy Saloon in Downtown Los Angeles, and Townhouse, the oldest bar in Venice.
20	4	"Paul Revere Williams"	Matt Bass	November 5, 2019
Although best known for designing the homes of celebrities like Lucille Ball and Frank Sinatra, the pioneering African American architect Paul Revere Williams also contributed to some of the city's most recognizable civic structures— all while confronting racism and racial barriers. In this episode, viewers visit Los Angeles International Airport's (LAX) iconic Theme Building, the Williams-designed Founder's Church of Religious Science, and the Pueblo del Rio public housing project.
21	5	"Discovering the Universe"	Matt Bass	November 12, 2019
As recently as a century ago, scientists doubted whether the universe extended beyond our own Milky Way—until astronomer Edwin Hubble, working with the world's most powerful telescope in the mountains high above Los Angeles, discovered just how vast our universe truly is. In this episode, viewers visit the underground vault of the Carnegie Observatories in Pasadena, where paradigm-shifting discoveries are annotated by hand-on-glass photographic slides; and the historic Mount Wilson Observatory.
22	6	"Shindana Toy Company"	Matt Bass	November 19, 2019
The 1965 Watts riots (also known as the Watts Rebellion or Uprising) left South Los Angeles in social and economic distress. In their aftermath, Operation Bootstrap, a non-profit community-based organization was formed, with hopes of facilitating change through community empowerment. This episode explores the lasting impact of one Operation Bootstrap initiative, the Shindana Toy Company, whose ethnically correct black dolls forever changed the American doll industry. We visit a doll collector, meet with former Operation Bootstrap organizers, and hear about the enduring legacy of Operation Bootstrap from a family of women who once made clothing for Shindana dolls. It's a story of community strength and economic revival—and one that, outside South L.A.'s Black community, is barely known.

=== Season 5 (Premiered March 19, 2022) ===
No. overall	No. in season	Title	Directed by	Original release date
23	1	"Who Killed the Red Car?"	Matt Bass	March 19, 2022
Host Nathan Masters rides a restored streetcar with Southern California Railway Museum co-founder Harvey Laner.
24	2	"Winemaking"	Matt Bass	March 26, 2022
Host Nathan Masters picks grapes from the oldest vines in Los Angeles with Michael Holland at Villa Adobe.
25	3	"Prehistoric Landscapes"	Matt Bass	April 2, 2022
Host Nathan Masters sifts through a natural archive of climate change with Emily Lindsey (Assistant Curator and Excavation Site Director at the La Brea Tar Pits and Museum) and Sean Campbell (Preparator, Rancho La Brea).
26	4	"German Exiles"	Matt Bass	April 9, 2022
Host Nathan Masters meets with Claudia Gordon to tour Villa Aurora, a Pacific Palisades house that hosted spirited literary salons.
27	5	"From Little Tokyo to Crenshaw"	Matt Bass	April 16, 2022
Host Nathan Masters visits Kristen Hayashi, Ph.D., the collections manager at the Japanese American National Museum.

=== Season 6 (Premiered January 2, 2024) ===
No. overall	No. in season	Title	Directed by	Original release date
28	1	"Fast Food and Car Culture"	Matt Bass	January 2, 2024
From McDonald's to Taco Bell, many of the world's most iconic fast-food chains were born in SoCal including Bob's Big Boy, In-N-Out Burger and Del Taco. This episode explores how car culture and the restaurant industry collided in the L.A. region, forever shaping the way Americans dine and drive. Featured interviews include: L.A. Times' Gustavo Arellano and Stacy Perman, LA Magazine's Chris Nichols and author/chef George Geary.
29	2	"Historic Filipinotown"	Matt Bass	January 10, 2024
Filipino Americans fight to make their heritage more visible in Los Angeles. This episode explores the Yo-Yo's surprising origin story, tours Historic Filipinotown in a Jeepny and tastes classic Filipino street foods. Featured interviews include: activist/librarian Florante Ibanez and the hosts of "This Filipino Life" podcast.
30	3	"Hiking Trailblazers"	Matt Bass	January 17, 2024
Meet the people who led Angelenos onto their local trails, including early wellness guru Paul Bragg. In this episode, Nathan explores the origins of L.A. hiking, from the Indigenous people who first walked the land to activists like WalkGood LA's Etienne Maurice who blaze new paths over familiar terrain. Featured interviews include: Modern Hiker's Casey Schreiner.
31	4	"Eternal City: Los Angeles Cemeteries"	Matt Bass	January 24, 2024
Visit Forest Lawn, Evergreen and Hollywood Forever to see how LA reinvented the cemetery. In this episode, Nathan and UCLA's Eric Avila visit the gravesites of the rich and famous while learning how racial segregation once divided the dead. Featured interviews include: The Chinese Historical Society's Eugene Moy and film historian Karie Bible.
32	5	"Tuberculosis, the Forgotten Plague"	Matt Bass	January 31, 2024
Archives reveal the "forgotten plague" that shaped Southern California. In this episode, Nathan explores how California's fresh air and cheap land drew consumptives to local sanatoriums as well as the stark reality of life as a tuberculosis patient. Featured interviews include: USC's William Deverell, LA Times' Patt Morrison and infectious disease specialist Dr. Brenda Jones.
33	5	"Tiki Bars and Their Hollywood Origins"	Matt Bass	February 7, 2024
Nathan explores some of the oldest Tiki bars in Southern California. In this episode, discover the Hollywood origins of Don the Beachcomber and learn how postwar American pop culture appropriated the rich traditions of the South Pacific. Featured interviews include: Tiki Ti's Mike Buhen, Tiki Scholar Sven Kirsten and Strong Water's Ying Chang and Robert Adamson.

=== Season 7 (Premiered January 7, 2025) ===
No. overall	No. in season	Title	Directed by	Original release date
34	1	"Space Shuttle"	Matt Bass	January 7, 2025
The Space Shuttle Endeavour has its journey traced from the program's very origins to the now iconic display open to the public at The California Science Center. Nathan highlights the significant achievements of local astronauts, test pilots, engineers and blue-collar workers, showcasing how Southern California became a vital stepping stone in humanity's journey into the cosmos. Featured interviews include astronaut John Daniel "Danny" Olivas, Colonel Maryann Karlen and curator Kenneth E. Phillips.
35	2	"Cold War Secrecy"	Matt Bass	January 10, 2025
The Cold War had a profound impact on Southern California's infrastructure, revealing a landscape rife with secrets underneath. Nathan explores artifacts from LA's military and aerospace industries throughout the city as he uncovers how federal investments transformed the region, simultaneously creating a wealth of opportunity while cloaking the area in a culture of secrecy. Featured interviews include historian D. J. Waldie, combat photographer Ken Hackman and museum founder Justin Jampol.
36	3	"When the St. Francis Dam Collapsed"	Matt Bass	January 21, 2025
Author Geoff Manaugh joins Nathan to understand the 1928 St. Francis Dam collapse, which unleashed a deadly flood that devastated the Santa Clara River Valley. Visit the dam site, follow the 54-mile flood path to the Pacific and uncover stories of loss, resilience and heroism. Explore the disaster's impact on Mexican American families and hear from experts on its lasting significance. Featured interviews include professor Jose Alamillo, archaeologist Ann Stansell and seismologist Lucy Jones.
37	4	"Animation"	Matt Bass	January 28, 2025
Uncover Disney's roots and Walt Disney's first home as Nathan explores how Los Angeles became the birthplace of modern animation. Animators Floyd Norman and Jane Baer, producer Don Hahn, composer John Debney and voice actor Bill Farmer explain how the city transformed cartoons into the art form of animation. Take a one-of-a-kind tour of Disney's Animation Research Library and learn what it takes to bring drawn characters to life.

=== Season 8 (Premiered January 6, 2026) ===
No. overall	No. in season	Title	Directed by	Original release date
38	1	"The Fast and the Forgotten"	Matt Bass	January 6, 2026
Explore Southern California’s century-long love affair with car racing. Once a major form of entertainment, racing drew crowds and shaped the region’s car culture. Host Nathan Masters visits the Auto Club of Southern California’s archives, watches land speed racers in the high desert, tours the Petersen Museum’s vault and uncovers the hidden racing history of the Santa Monica Mountains. Featured interviews include author Harold Osmer, historian Morgan Yates, archivists Laura Fisher and Nathaniel Salvini, photographer Allen Kuhn, retired ranger Tom Young and SCTA race director Bill Lattin.
39	2	"Sci-Fi Origins"	Matt Bass	January 13, 2026
Boldly go into the heart of science fiction storytelling and discover its deep roots in Los Angeles. From UC Riverside’s vast sci-fi collection to author Octavia Butler’s Pasadena, host Nathan Masters explores how Southern California became a launchpad for stories that imagine new worlds—and reflect hopes and fears. Featured interviews include librarian Phoenix Alexander, scholar Ayana Jamieson, curator Alexis Bard Johnson, ONE Archives at USC Libraries director Joseph Hawkins and Los Angeles Science Fantasy Society members.
40	3	"True Crime"	Matt Bass	January 20, 2026
Host Nathan Masters examines old crimes like a 1950s Burbank murder and how these moments shaped the true crime genre. Featuring author Michael Connelly, former prosecutor Marcia Clark, podcaster Kate Winkler Dawson and historian William Deverell, the episode explores how Los Angeles' crimes have influenced storytellers and the city’s cultural identity.
41	4	"California Blooms"	Matt Bass	January 27, 2026
Meet the personalities who bring year-round color to California’s landscape. Hunt for native wildflowers in the Santa Monica Mountains, visit San Diego to learn how horticulturalist Kate Sessions colorized the Golden State, stop by Whittier for a debate on the controversial jacaranda tree and see how Burbank’s annual Rose Parade float comes together. Featured interviews include Los Angeles Times journalists Gustavo Arellano and Julia Wick, float designer Eric C. Andersen and botanist Mare Nazaire.
