= Dark Invasion =

Book by Howard Blum

Dark invasion: 1915: Germany's Secret War and the Hunt for the First Terrorist Cell in America
- US edition
- Author: Howard Blum
- Subject: spies
- Genre: military history
- Set in: World War I
- Publisher: Crown Publishing Group, Harper
- Publication date: 2014
- ISBN: 9780062307552 American ed.
- OCLC: 858749315

Dark Invasion: 1915: Germany's Secret War and the Hunt for the First Terrorist Cell in America is a non-fiction book written by the American author, Howard Blum. It was published by Crown Publishing Group on February 11, 2014. The American edition was issued by Harper in 2014.

== Plot ==
During the early years of World War I, America maintained neutrality in theory but in practice it traded only with the Allies. Germany sought to sabotage that trade and prevent America supplies reaching the Allies. The German efforts included spying, planting bombs in ships and factories, bombing the U.S. Capitol, and shooting the financier J.P. Morgan, Jr.

On January 14, 2013, Warner Bros. acquired the film rights to the book, and set Bradley Cooper to star and produce through his 22 & Indiana Pictures, along with John Lesher through his Le Grisbi Productions, and Adam Kassan.
