= Mariah Blake =

American investigative journalist

Mariah Blake is an American investigative journalist whose writing has appeared in The New York Times, The Atlantic, Mother Jones, The New Republic, CJR, and other publications.

In 2025, Blake published the book They Poisoned the World: Life and Death in the Age of Forever Chemicals, a sweeping investigation of the American chemical industry and its decades-long cover-up of the dangers of PFAS, which are commonly known as "forever chemicals" because they don't break down in the environment. The book was a finalist for the PEN/E. O. Wilson Literary Science Writing Award; the J. Anthony Lukas Book Prize from Columbia University and the Nieman Foundation for Journalism at Harvard; a Los Angeles Times Book Prize; and the Edgar Award for Best Fact Crime from Mystery Writers of America. It was also named one of the best nonfiction books of 2025 by The Washington Post and Scientific American, which praise it as an "an epic of science writing."

Blake earned a Bachelor of Arts in English from Barnard College and a Master of Science in journalism from the Columbia University Graduate School of Journalism. She was the 2016 Murrey Marder Nieman Fellow in Watchdog Journalism at Harvard University.
