= Insight (Sunday Times) =

Part of the Sunday Times

Insight is the investigative team of the British newspaper The Sunday Times. The project was begun by Clive Irving in 1963. An early investigation was into the Profumo affair. Insight is known for revealing in 1967 that the defector to Russia, Kim Philby, was the third man in the Cambridge Spy ring; for investigating the thalidomide controversy; and for revealing the secret manufacture of nuclear weapons by Israel. In 2011, it exposed the FIFA cash for votes scandal.
