= Tinseltown: Murder, Morphine, and Madness at the Dawn of Hollywood =

2014 book by William J. Mann

- First edition
- Author: William J. Mann
- Genre: Crime, Non-fiction
- Published: 2014
- Publisher: HarperCollins
- Pages: 480
- Awards: Edgar Award for Best True Crime, 2015
- ISBN: 978-0-062-24216-7
- Website: Tinseltown

Tinseltown: Murder, Morphine, and Madness at the Dawn of Hollywood (ISBN 978-0-062-24216-7) is a book by William J. Mann published by HarperCollins on 14 October 2014. It won the Edgar Award for Best Fact Crime in 2015.
