= To the Last Breath =

1998 book

- Author: Carlton Stowers
- Language: English
- Genre: Nonfiction
- Publisher: St. Martin's Press
- Publication date: 15 January 1998
- Publication place: United States
- Media type: Hardcover
- Pages: 256
- ISBN: 978-0-8050-2264-3

To the Last Breath: Three Women Fight for the Truth Behind a Child's Tragic Murder, is a book written by author and journalist Carlton Stowers, recounts the true story of the mysterious death of a two-year-old child. Initially the infant's death was said to be of natural causes, but further investigation revealed that the child was suffocated by her father.

== Critical reception ==
- Booklist praised Stowers for his "masterful chronicle of a troubling case."
- The book won the Edgar Award for Best Fact Crime in 1998.
