= Howard Blum =

American author and journalist

- Born: 1948 (age 77–78)
- Education: Horace Mann School; Stanford University
- Occupation: Author
- Spouse: Jane Davenport "Jenny" Cox (m. 1991; div.)
- Children: Tony; Anna; Dani
- Writing career
- Language: English
- Genre: Non-fiction
- Notable work: American Lightning
- Notable awards: Edgar Allan Poe Award for Best Fact Crime, 2009
- Website: www.howardblum.com

Howard Blum (/ˈblʌm/) (born 1948) is an American author and journalist. Formerly a reporter for The Village Voice and The New York Times, Blum is a contributing editor at Vanity Fair and the author of several non-fiction books, including the New York Times bestseller and Edgar Award winner American Lightning.

== Career ==
In 1986, Blum began working as a reporter for the New York Times, where he earned two Pulitzer Prize nominations. Since 1994, Blum has been a contributing editor to Vanity Fair. Several of his books were non-fiction bestsellers, including Gangland, Wanted, The Gold of Exodus, and The Brigade: An Epic Story of Vengeance, Salvation, and WWII. Additionally, a number of his works have been optioned for film. Miramax Films purchased the rights from Blum for six figures to turn The Brigade into a major motion picture, although it seems the movie was never made.

== Personal life ==
Blum is the son of Harold K. Blum (1917–1984), an executive at the Kane Miller Corporation in Tarrytown, New York, and Gertrude Blum, a schoolteacher in New York City. For high school, Blum attended the Horace Mann School and earned his undergraduate degree from Stanford University, where he also received an M.A. in government in 1970. In January 1991, he married Jenny Cox, a book editor. They are divorced. He currently resides in Sag Harbor, New York and Connecticut. Howard is the brother of celebrity wedding planner Marcy Blum.

== Bibliography ==
- Wanted! The Search for Nazis in America (1977), New York: Quadrangle/New York Times Book Co., ISBN 0812906071
- Wishful Thinking (1985), New York: Atheneum Books, ISBN 0689115431
- I Pledge Allegiance--: The True Story of the Walkers: An American Spy Family (1987), New York: Simon & Schuster, ISBN 0671626140
- Out There: The Government's Secret Quest for Extraterrestrials (1990), New York, Simon & Schuster, ISBN 0671662600
- Gangland: How the FBI Broke the Mob (1993), New York: Pocket Books, ISBN 0671900153
- The Gold of Exodus: The Discovery of the True Mount Sinai (1998), New York: Simon & Schuster, ISBN 0684809184
- The Brigade: An Epic Story of Vengeance, Salvation, and World War II (2001), New York: HarperCollins, ISBN 0060194863
- The Eve of Destruction: The Untold Story of the Yom Kippur War (2003), New York: HarperCollins, ISBN 0060013990
- American Lightning: Terror, Mystery, the Birth of Hollywood, and the Crime of the Century (2008), New York: Crown Publishers, ISBN 0307346943
- The Floor of Heaven: A True Tale of the Last Frontier and the Yukon Gold Rush (2011), New York: Crown Publishers, ISBN 0307461726
- Dark Invasion: 1915: Germany’s Secret War and the Hunt for the First Terrorist Cell in America (2014), New York: Crown Publishers, ISBN 0307461750
- The Last Goodnight: A World War II Story of Espionage, Adventure, and Betrayal (2016), HarperCollins, ISBN 0062307673
- In the Enemy's House: The Secret Saga of the FBI Agent and the Code Breaker Who Caught the Russian Spies (2018), HarperCollins Publishers, ISBN 0062458248
- Night of the Assassins: The Untold Story of Hitler's Plot to Kill FDR, Churchill, and Stalin (2020), HarperCollins Publishers.
- The Spy Who Knew Too Much: An Ex-CIA Officer's Quest Through a Legacy of Betrayal (2022), HarperCollins Publishers, ISBN 9780063054219
- When the Night Comes Falling: A Requiem for the Idaho Student Murders (2024), HarperCollins Publishers
