= The Life of Ian Fleming =

Biography of Ian Fleming by John Pearson

- Author: John Pearson
- Language: English
- Subject: Ian Fleming
- Genre: Biography
- Publisher: Jonathan Cape
- Publication date: October 1966
- ISBN: 1448208068

The Life of Ian Fleming is a biography of Ian Fleming, the creator of James Bond and author of the children's book Chitty Chitty Bang Bang. The biography was written by John Pearson, Fleming's assistant at the London Sunday Times, and published in October 1966 by Jonathan Cape (ISBN 1448208068). Pearson later wrote the official, fictional-biography James Bond: The Authorized Biography of 007 in 1973, and his research papers and interviews for the biography were published as Ian Fleming The Notes by Queen Anne Press in 2020. The Life of Ian Fleming was one of the first biographies of Ian Fleming and is considered a collectible book by many James Bond fans, since Pearson would become the third, official James Bond author.

Future editions of The Life of Ian Fleming were altered after film producer Kevin McClory alleged that parts of the biography were untrue regarding the novel and film rights to Thunderball.

In 1989 the biography was turned into a movie, Goldeneye.

The 1967 American paperback edition was retitled Alias James Bond—The Life of Ian Fleming. No other edition has this title.
