= Story of a Murder =

2025 book by Hallie Rubenhold

- Author: Hallie Rubenhold
- Genre: Non-fiction
- Publisher: Dutton
- Publication date: 25 March 2025
- Pages: 512
- ISBN: 9780593184615

Story of a Murder: The Wives, the Mistress and Doctor Crippen is a 2025 book by Hallie Rubenhold. The book's subject is Hawley Harvey Crippen, an American doctor executed for the 1910 murder of his wife Cora Crippen, known by her stage name Belle Elmore.
