= American Lightning =

2008 book by Howard Blum

- First edition
- Author: Howard Blum
- Published: 2008
- Publisher: Crown/Archetype
- Publication place: United States
- ISBN: 9780307346940

American Lightning: Terror, Mystery, the Birth of Hollywood, and the Crime of the Century is a non-fiction book by Howard Blum, published in 2008.

== Summary ==
The book is about the October 1, 1910 bombing of the Los Angeles Times building by union members. Iron Workers Union leaders James and John McNamara plead not guilty. The detective who found out that the bombers were the McNamaras was Billy Burns, the head of Burns Detective Agency. The book also includes a considerable amount of information about the defense lawyer Clarence Darrow and film director D. W. Griffith, who were involved in the case.

== Reception ==
Ohline H. Cogdill wrote in the Miami Herald that the book is epic, gripping, and a cohesive non-fiction thriller. Richard Rayner wrote in the Los Angeles Times that the book is excellent and sheds valuable new light on the bombing.

== Awards ==
- Edgar Allan Poe Award for Best Fact Crime, 2009
