= A Great Fall =

1970 non-fiction book by Mildred Savage

- Author: Mildred Savage
- Language: English
- Publisher: Simon & Schuster
- Publication date: 1970
- Publication place: United States
- Media type: Print (Hardback & Paperback)

A Great Fall is a non-fiction book by Mildred Savage. It was originally published in hardback by Simon & Schuster in 1970.

The book quotes from Giles v. State of Maryland, 386 U.S. 66, "A criminal trial is not a game in which the State’s function is to outwit and entrap its quarry. The State’s pursuit is justice, not a victim."
