= Hallie Rubenhold =

British historian and author

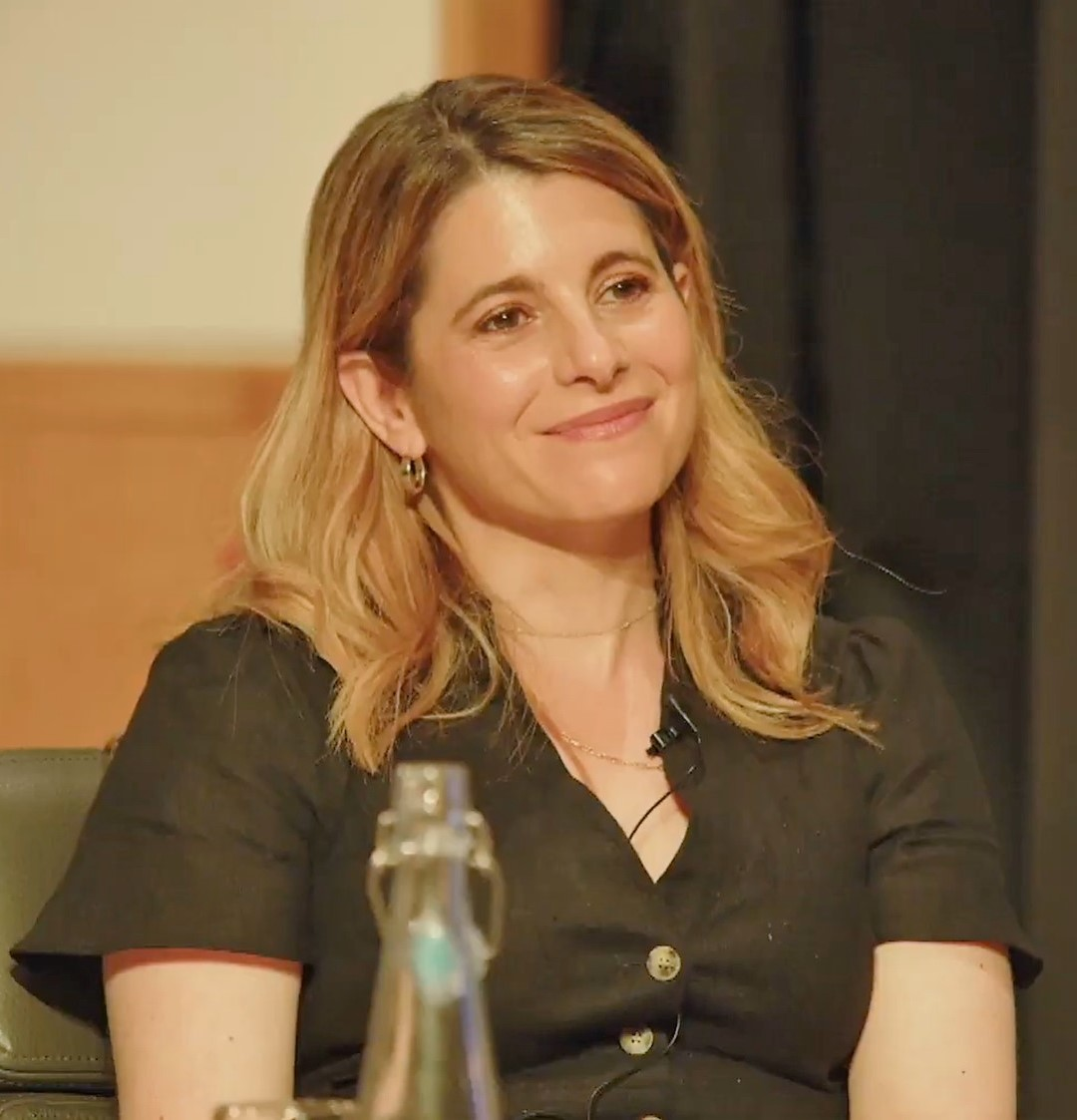
- Rubenhold at the British Library in 2022
- Born: 1971 (age 54–55); Los Angeles, California, U.S.

Academic background
- Education: University of Massachusetts Amherst (BA); University of Leeds (MA, MPhil)

Academic work
- Discipline: History
- Sub-discipline: Social history; History of the United Kingdom; Victorian era
- Notable works: The Five: The Untold Lives of the Women Killed by Jack the Ripper (2019)

Hallie Rubenhold (born 1971) is an American-born British popular historian and author. Her work specializes in 18th- and 19th-century social history and women's history. Her 2019 book The Five, about the lives of the women murdered by Jack the Ripper, was shortlisted for the Wolfson History Prize and won the Baillie Gifford Prize for Non-fiction. In 2025, her book, Story of a Murder; the wives, the mistress and Dr Crippen won a Clue Award for True Crime Book of the Year. Clue Awards seek to recognise "excellence and responsible story telling in true crime". Rubenhold's focus on the victims of murder (frequently women), rather than on the identity or the acts of the perpetrator, has been credited with changing attitudes to the proper commemoration of such crimes and to the appeal and function of the true crime genre.

== Early life ==
Rubenhold was born in Los Angeles to a British father and American mother and undertook a BA in History at the University of Massachusetts, Amherst. She then gained an MA in British History and History of Art and an MPhil in History from the University of Leeds, on the subject of marriage and child-rearing in the 18th century. Rubenhold has also worked in the commercial art world for Philip Mould and as an assistant curator for the National Portrait Gallery.

== Career ==
In 2005, she wrote a history of Harris's List of Covent Garden Ladies and its author in her book The Covent Garden Ladies: Pimp General Jack and the Extraordinary Story of Harris's List, and, in 2008, she published The Harlot's Handbook: Harris's List, a selection of the directories' "funniest, rudest and most surreal entries". The BBC later adapted the material for a documentary, presented by Rubenhold herself called The Harlot's Handbook.

Rubenhold appears regularly as an expert contributor on history documentaries for British and US networks. In the past she has appeared on BBC 2's Balderdash and Piffle, discussing the origins of merkins with burlesque star Immodesty Blaize and on BBC 4's Age of Excess. She has contributed to the BBC series The Beauty of Maps and to History Cold Case and to Channel 4's Titanic: The Mission, as well as the Travel Channel's Mysteries at the Museum and Private Lives of the Monarchs. She also works as a historical consultant for period dramas, including Jonathan Strange & Mr Norrell (BBC) and Harlots (Hulu / Amazon).

Her book, Lady Worsley's Whim, published in November 2008, is an account of one of the 18th-century's most sensational sex scandals, the criminal conversation case of Sir Richard Worsley against Maurice George Bisset for having committed adultery with Seymour Fleming, a member of The New Female Coterie established by Caroline Stanhope, Countess of Harrington. It featured as BBC Radio 4's Book of the Week from 3 November 2008 and was adapted into a 90-minute drama for BBC 2 entitled The Scandalous Lady W, broadcast on 17 August 2015, and starring Natalie Dormer.

Rubenhold has written two novels, both set during the 18th century. The French Lesson is set during the Terror in Revolutionary Paris. It follows on from her first novel, Mistress of My Fate, the first book in the Confessions of Henrietta Lightfoot series. Both books are written as an hommage to classic works of 18th- and early 19th-century literature.

The Five: The Untold Lives of the Women Killed by Jack the Ripper, a biography of the "canonical five" victims of Jack the Ripper, won the £50,000 Baillie Gifford Prize in 2019 and was named the Hay Festival Book of the Year. It was also shortlisted for the 2020 Wolfson History Prize. Criminologist Paul Bleakley said that Rubenhold's unapologetically feminist approach had "disrupted the very foundations of Ripperology.", and that while Rubenhold's work includes speculation, such speculation can be justified.

== Personal life ==
As of 2026, Rubenhold is married and lives in London.

== Bibliography ==
- (2005:a) The Covent Garden Ladies: Pimp General Jack and the extraordinary story of "Harris' List" . Stroud: Tempus ISBN 0-7524-2850-0
- (ed.) (2005:b) "Harris's List of Covent-Garden Ladies": sex in the city in Georgian Britain. Stroud: Tempus
- (2008:a) Lady Worsley’s Whim; An Eighteenth Century Tale of Sex, Scandal and Divorce. Chatto & Windus. US title: The Lady in Red
- (2007:b) The Harlot's Handbook: Harris's List. Tempus
- (2011) Mistress of My Fate; The Confessions of Henrietta Lightfoot Transworld
- (2015) The French Lesson Transworld
- (2019) The Five: The Untold Lives of the Women Killed by Jack the Ripper Doubleday ISBN 978-0-85752-4485
- (2025) Story of a Murder: The Wives, the Mistress and Doctor Crippen
