= Joe Domanick =

American investigative journalist and historian (born 1943)

- Born: February 10, 1943 (age 83)
- Education: University of Southern California; Columbia University; Hunter College
- Notable work: Blue: The LAPD and the Battle to Redeem American Policing

Joe Domanick is an American investigative journalist and historian. The author of four books focused on criminal justice, corruption and reform, he writes about California culture, politics, and policing.

Domanick was the associate director of the Center on the Media, Crime and Justice at John Jay College of Criminal Justice, senior fellow at USC's Institute for Justice and Journalism, and professor at the Institute for Justice and Journalism at the USC Annenberg School of Communication.

His book To Protect and To Serve won the Edgar Allan Poe Award for Best Fact Crime book. Blue was a finalist for the Los Angeles Times Book Prize for current interest in 2015.

== Publications ==
- Faking it in America: Barry Minkow and the Great ZZZZ Best Scam. Chicago: Contemporary Books. 1989. ISBN 978-0-8092-4497-3.
- To Protect and to Serve: The LAPD's Century of War in the City of Dreams; Pocket Books. New York: Pocket Books. 1994. ISBN 978-0-671-75111-1.
- Cruel Justice: Three Strikes and the Politics of Crime in America's Golden State. Berkeley, CA: University of California Press. 2005. ISBN 978-0-520-24668-3.
- Blue: The LAPD and the Battle to Redeem American Policing. New York: Simon & Schuster. 2015. ISBN 978-1-4516-4107-3.
