= In Vivo (novel) =

1964 novel by Mildred Savage

- First edition
- Author: Mildred Savage
- Language: English
- Publisher: Simon & Schuster
- Publication date: 1964
- Publication place: United States
- Media type: Print (hardback & paperback)

In Vivo is a 1964 novel by American writer Mildred Savage. The novel was originally published in hardback by Simon & Schuster in 1964.

== Synopsis ==
In 1946, young, idealistic scientist Tom Cable steers the fiscally conservative Enright Drug and Chemical Company into dangerous financial waters by committing an increasing number of company resources to the research and development of a new broad-spectrum antibiotic.

Supporting Cable in his search for a new broad-spectrum antibiotic are Ade Hale (president), Will Caroline (vice-president for research), Maxwell Strong, and Dr. Mills. Opposing them are Claude Morrissey (director of biochemistry) and Gil Brainard (vice-president for production). The story line is linear with traditional character arcs. The heroes and villains are archetypal with the heroes often possessing trope-like names (e.g. Max Strong, Constance, Hope, etc.) and generally embodying all that is good while the villains back-stab, bicker and descend into abject immorality.
