= In Vivo (EP) =

EP by Loco Locass
- Released: June 10, 2003
- Genre: Rap
- Language: French
- Label: Freeset (Canada); FRCD3633 (CD)

Loco Locass chronology
Manifestif (2000)	In Vivo (2003)	Amour Oral (2004)

Professional ratings
Review scores
Source	Rating
Voir	link

In Vivo is an extended play (EP) musical recording by Loco Locass. The album, released in 2003, includes 6 tracks. The CD-ROM version of the recording includes 12 audio files and 6 video files. The genre of the music is rap and the language is (Canadian) French.

== Track listing ==
No.	Title	Length
1.	"ROC Rap"
2.	"Super Mario"
3.	"Yallah" (live)
4.	"Sheila Djom" (live)
5.	"Le grand Rio" (live)
6.	"Soupe du jour"

== CD-ROM content ==
Audio Files

1. "ROC rap"
2. "Super Mario"
3. "Manifestif (Live)"
4. "Art politik (Live)"
5. "Langage-toi (Live)"
6. "Boom Baby Boom!" (Live)"
7. "Priapée la p'tite vite (a cappella) (Live)"
8. "Art poétik (Live)"
9. "Yallah (Live)"
10. "Sheila Djom (Live)"
11. "Le grand Rio (Live)"
12. "Soupe du jour"

Video Files

1. "ROC rap"
2. "Super Mario"
3. "Sheila, ch'us là (Live)"
4. "Manifestif (Live)"
5. "Langage-toi (Live)"
6. "Le grand Rio (Interactive Music Video)"
