= William J. Mann =

American novelist, biographer, and Hollywood historian

William J. Mann (born August 7, 1963) is an American novelist, biographer, and Hollywood historian best known for his studies of Hollywood and the American film industry, especially his 2006 biography of Katharine Hepburn, Kate: The Woman Who Was Hepburn. Kate was named one of the 100 Notable Books of 2006 by The New York Times. Under the pseudonym Geoffrey Huntington he wrote the Ravenscliff series of young adult fantasy novels.

== Early life and education ==
Mann was born August 7, 1963, in Connecticut. His father, William H. Mann, was the treasurer for the city of Middletown, Connecticut, and his mother, Carol (née Soderlind), worked for the Connecticut Superior Court (the state trial court of general jurisdiction).

Mann received his undergraduate degree at Central Connecticut State University in 1984. After working briefly as a Capitol Hill aide, he received his master's degree in liberal studies (with a concentration in history and film) in 1988 at Wesleyan University.

== Career ==
He got his start as a journalist at the now-defunct Hartford Monthly magazine. He freelanced for, among others, Architectural Digest, Connecticut magazine, Men's Fitness, Frontiers (Los Angeles), and The Boston Phoenix. He also wrote for and edited Metroline magazine, a gay-lesbian newsmagazine based in Hartford, Connecticut, before acting as publisher from 1992 to 1995.

Mann's first novel, The Men From the Boys, was published by Dutton in 1997. He continued with a series of novels set in Provincetown, although he has also set his fiction in Palm Springs and Los Angeles. In addition, Mann has written the nonfiction books Wisecracker (1998), a biography of film star William Haines, for which he won the Lambda Literary Award, Behind the Screen: How Gays and Lesbians Shaped Hollywood (2001), and Edge of Midnight: The Life of John Schlesinger (2005).

His 2006 biography of Katharine Hepburn, Kate: The Woman Who Was Hepburn, was named one of the Best Books of the Year by Publishers Weekly, that gave it a starred review, saying, "Hepburn's siblings and contemporaries (now free to speak after her death) make major corrections to earlier Hepburn biographies, creating a picture of a complex woman rather than the icon she worked hard to become in the public's eye. This will surely be the definitive version of Hepburn's life for decades to come, as it is an outstanding example of painstaking research matched with splendid writing." In 2009, Mann wrote How to Be a Movie Star: Elizabeth Taylor in Hollywood. "Reading this life is like gorging on a chocolate sundae," Publishers Weekly wrote of the book. "This is a smart book about a surprisingly savvy superstar. It's one of the best Hollywood biographies I've ever read," said Ed Sikov, author of Dark Victory: The Life of Bette Davis.

Hello Gorgeous: Becoming Barbra Streisand (Houghton Mifflin) followed in 2012. "A fresh exploration of the early years of Streisand," wrote the Washington Post. "Trying to figure out the Barbra Streisand mystique is no easy task, but Mann expertly captures the launch of her remarkable career in the early 1960s when a unique 'star was born.' Mann's meticulous research and insightful analysis go deeper than any previous biography..." said USA Today.

Mann's next book, Tinseltown: Murder, Morphine, and Madness at the Dawn of Hollywood (HarperCollins, 2014), is the story of how the Hollywood studio system and the Hays Office were established during the early 1920s, told alongside the famous, unsolved murder mystery of director William Desmond Taylor. Tinseltown was a New York Times bestseller and won the 2015 Edgar Award (presented by the Mystery Writers of America) as Best Fact Crime Book of the Year. NPR named it one of the best books of the year, adding "Brings the early days of the movie industry to sparkling life." Rex Reed raved: "Sex! Drama! Scandal! If you have the slightest curiosity about the dark purple scars of Hollywood history, this is the go-to book you cannot miss. . . Epic and fabulous—every page is haunting, every chapter a film noir. I was up all night."

== Personal life ==
Mann says that he knew he was gay when he was in the fifth grade. He came out privately to friends in his late teens. He was outed in 1991 when the Hartford Courant, covering a gay rights rally at the state capitol, published his name and photo. Although his family reacted negatively to the disclosure at first, within six years his parents were completely supportive.

He met his husband, Dr. Timothy Huber, in 1988. They married in 2004.

== Bibliography ==
=== Non-fiction ===
- Wisecracker: The Life and Times of William Haines (1998)
- Behind the Screen: How Gays and Lesbians Shaped Hollywood (2001)
- Edge of Midnight: The Life of John Schlesinger (2005)
- Kate: The Woman Who Was Hepburn (2006)
- How to Be a Movie Star: Elizabeth Taylor in Hollywood (2009)
- Hello Gorgeous: Becoming Barbra Streisand (2012)
- Tinseltown: Murder, Morphine, and Madness at the Dawn of Hollywood (2014)
- The Contender: The Story of Marlon Brando (2020)
- Bogie & Bacall: The Surprising True Story of Hollywood's Greatest Love Affair (2023)
- Black Dahlia: Murder, Monsters, and Madness in Midcentury Hollywood (2026)

=== Fiction ===
- The Men From the Boys (1997)
- The Biograph Girl (2000)
- Where the Boys Are (2003)
- All American Boy (2005)
- Men Who Love Men (2007)
- Object of Desire (2009). New York, NY: Kensington. pp. 426. ISBN 978-0758213778 OCLC 298183298

=== Geoffrey Huntington ===
- Sorcerers of the Nightwing - The Ravenscliff Series Book 1 (2002)
- Demon Witch - The Ravenscliff Series Book 2 (2004)
- Blood Moon - The Ravenscliff Series Book 3 (2013)
