= John Pearson (author) =

English biographer and novelist (1930–2021)

- Born: 5 October 1930; Epsom, Surrey, England
- Died: 13 November 2021 (aged 91)
- Occupation: Writer
- Writing career
- Genre: Biography
- Website: www.johnpearson.uk

John George Pearson (5 October 1930 – 13 November 2021) was an English novelist and an author of biographies, notably of Ian Fleming (the creator of James Bond), of the Sitwells, and of the Kray twins.

== Life and career ==
Pearson was born in Epsom, Surrey. He was educated at King's College School, Wimbledon, and Peterhouse, Cambridge, where he gained a double first in history. He then worked for The Economist, BBC Television and The Sunday Times. He was Ian Fleming's assistant at the Sunday Times and went on to write the first biography of Fleming, The Life of Ian Fleming, published in 1966.

Pearson was commissioned by Donald Campbell to chronicle his successful attempt on the Land Speed Record in 1964 in Bluebird CN7, resulting in the book Bluebird and the Dead Lake.

Pearson had also written "true crime" biographies, such as The Profession of Violence, an account of the rise and fall of the Kray twins, who had hired him to write their biography in 1967. Over the next several years the brothers, who by now were in jail, wrote frequently to Pearson. He wrote two further books about the Krays: The Cult of Violence: The Untold Story of the Krays and Notorious: The Immortal Legend of the Kray Twins. In 2010 Pearson put up for auction more than 160 previously unseen letters and photographs from the Kray twins. The items sold for £20,780.

Another of Pearson's books, The Gamblers, is an account of the group of gamblers who made up what was known as the Clermont Set, including John Aspinall, James Goldsmith and Lord Lucan. Warner Bros. purchased the film rights to the book in 2006. The Gamblers was made into a two-part TV drama, Lucan, starring Rory Kinnear and Christopher Eccleston, broadcast on ITV1 in December 2013. Pearson himself appears as a character in Lucan; he is played by Paul Freeman.

Pearson's book Facades was the first full-scale biography of the Sitwell siblings Edith, Osbert and Sacheverell. It was published in 1978.

Pearson had also written five novels. Storm Jameson praised his first novel, Gone to Timbuctoo, as "an unusually good first novel, an exciting story, and a splendid setting in French West Africa. The writing is sharp and witty." Malcolm Muggeridge said, "This is an exceptionally brilliant first novel - exciting, wryly funny and perceptive."

For his next three novels, Pearson did tie-in fictional biographies. Pearson also became the third official author of the James Bond series, writing in 1973 James Bond: The Authorized Biography of 007, a first-person biography of the fictional secret agent James Bond. However, Pearson declined an offer to write further Bond novels. Pearson then did fictional tie-in works about Upstairs, Downstairs (The Bellamys of Eaton Place) and Biggles.

Pearson had three children from his first marriage. In 1980, he married his second wife, Lynette, daughter of Ian Hope Dundas of Dundas, 30th Chief of Clan Dundas, and former wife of Timothy Cecil Frankland. Pearson died on 13 November 2021, at the age of 91.

== Bibliography ==
=== Novels ===
- Gone To Timbuctoo (1962) - winner of the Authors' Club First Novel Award
- James Bond: The Authorized Biography of 007 (1973)
- The Bellamys of Eaton Place (1976) - published in the U.S. as The Bellamy Saga
- Biggles: The Authorised Biography (1978)
- The Kindness of Dr Avicenna (1982)

=== Non-fiction ===
Biographies

- Bluebird and the Dead Lake (1965) (published in the U.S. as The Last Hero: The Gallant Story of Donald Campbell and the Land Speed Record in 1966)
- The Life of Ian Fleming (1966)
- The Kray Twins series:
  1. The Profession of Violence: The Rise and Fall of the Kray Twins (1972) - nominated for an Edgar Allan Poe Award
  2. The Cult of Violence: The Untold Story of the Krays (2001)
  3. Notorious: The Immortal Legend of the Kray Twins (2010)
- Facades: Edith, Osbert and Sacheverell Sitwell (1978) (published in the U.S. as The Sitwells in 1979)
- Barbara Cartland: Crusader in Pink (1979), first published as by "Henry Cloud" but subsequently republished under his own name
- Stags and Serpents: The Story of the House of Cavendish and the Dukes of Devonshire (1983; revised 2002) (published in the U.S. as The Serpent and the Stag in 1984)
- The Ultimate Family: The Making of the Royal House of Windsor (1986) (published in the U.S. as The Selling of the Royal Family: The Mystique of the British Monarchy)
- Citadel of the Heart: Winston and the Churchill Dynasty (1991) (published in the U.S. as The Private Lives of Winston Churchill)
- Painfully Rich: the Outrageous Fortunes and Misfortunes of the Heirs of J. Paul Getty (1995)
- Blood Royal: The Story of the Spencers and the Royals (1999)
- One of the Family: The Englishman and the Mafia (2003)
- The Gamblers: John Aspinall, James Goldsmith and the Murder of Lord Lucan (2005)
- Ian Fleming: The Notes (2020)

History

- Airline Detective: The Fight Against International Air Crime (1962) co-written with BOAC Security expert Donald E. W. Fish although Pearson is uncredited
- Arena: The Story of the Colosseum (1973)
- Edward the Rake (1975) (published in the U.S. as Edward the Rake: An Unwholesome Biography of Edward VII)

Politics

- The Persuasion Industry (1965), with Graham Turner

== Adaptations ==
- Goldeneye (1989), telefilm directed by Don Boyd, based on non-fiction book The Life of Ian Fleming
- Lucan (2013), mini-series directed by Adrian Shergold, based on non-fiction book The Gamblers: John Aspinall, James Goldsmith and the Murder of Lord Lucan. Pearson himself appears as a character in the dramatisation; he is played by Paul Freeman.
- Legend (2015), film directed by Brian Helgeland, based on non-fiction book The Profession of Violence: The Rise and Fall of the Kray Twins
- All the Money in the World (2017), film directed by Ridley Scott, based on non-fiction book Painfully Rich: the Outrageous Fortunes and Misfortunes of the Heirs of J. Paul Getty
