= Amour Oral =

Studio album by Loco Locass
- Released: November 2, 2004
- Genre: Rap
- Length: 58:09
- Language: French
- Labels: Audiogram (Canada); ADCD10168 (CD)

Loco Locass chronology
In Vivo (EP) (2003)	Amour Oral (2004)

Singles from Amour Oral
- 1. "Groove grave" Released: February 2005; 2. "Bonzaïon" Released: May 2005; 3. "Spleen et Montréal" Released: February 2006; 4. "La censure pour l'échafaud" Released: August 2006

Professional ratings
Review scores
Source	Rating
Allmusic	4.5/5 stars
Bande à part	favorable
Canoe.ca	4.5/5 stars
Hour	3/5 stars
Voir	3.5/5 stars

Amour Oral is rap trio Loco Locass' second studio album.

The group won two awards for the album at the Felix Awards in 2005: Album of the Year - Hip Hop and Songwriter of the Year.

At the MIMI (Initiative musicale internationale de Montréal) gala in 2005, the group was awarded with Song of the Year for "Libérez-nous des libéraux," as well as "Mots-dits, for the depth and refinement of the delivery of the text."

The album also won a Grafika award for best CD/DVD cover in 2005.

Having crossed the threshold of 50,000 copies sold, Amour Oral has been certified gold.

== Track listing ==
No.	Title	Length
1.	"Résistance"	4:50
2.	"La bataille des murailles" (ft. Charbonniers de l'Enfer)	4:30
3.	"W Roi"	1:00
4.	"Antiaméricanisme primaire"	3:36
5.	"Groove Grave"	4:51
6.	"Bonzaïon"	4:52
7.	"La Censure pour l'échafaud"	4:39
8.	"Spleen et Montréal"	4:27
9.	"Maison et idéal" (ft. Karim of Syncop)	5:24
10.	"La Survenante"	5:28
11.	"Antigone"	4:18
12.	"Liberez-nous des libéraux"	6:04
13.	"Engouement"	4:02
