= Whipping Boy: The Forty-Year Search for My Twelve-Year-Old Bully =

2015 book by Allen Kurzweil

- Author: Allen Kurzweil
- Genre: Non-fiction, Memoir, Crime, Autobiography
- Published: 2015
- Publisher: HarperCollins
- Pages: 304
- Awards: Edgar Award for Best Fact Crime (2016)
- ISBN: 978-0-062-26948-5
- Website: Whipping Boy

Whipping Boy: The Forty-Year Search for My Twelve-Year-Old Bully (ISBN 978-0-062-26948-5) is a book written by Allen Kurzweil, which was published by HarperCollins on 20 January 2015 and later won the Edgar Award for Best Fact Crime in 2016.

The reviewer for The Washington Post wrote: "What becomes of bullies when they grow up? Do they evolve into decent, kind human beings, or does their capacity for malice grow along with their bodies? Allen Kurzweil explores this issue — and much more — in 'Whipping Boy,' a compulsive account of his search for the childhood tormentor who made his life miserable ... a fascinating, multi-pronged morality tale about victimhood, skewed perception and the liberation of facing your demons."
