= Mildred Savage =

American novelist

- Born: Mildred Spitz Savage; June 26, 1919; New London, Connecticut, U.S.
- Died: October 7, 2011 (aged 92); Norwich, Connecticut, U.S.
- Education: Wellesley College
- Occupation: Novelist
- Writing career
- Period: 1954–2011
- Genre: Fiction

Mildred Spitz Savage (June 26, 1919 – October 7, 2011) was an American author known for her best-selling novel Parrish.

== Biography and career ==
The second of three children, she was born in New London, Connecticut, to Ezekiel and Sadie Spitz. In 1937, she enrolled at Wellesley College, graduating in 1941 with a bachelor's degree in history. Soon after graduating, she married Bernard Savage and moved to Norwich, Connecticut.

Her first work, The Lumberyard and Mrs. Barrie, was published in 1952. It was a largely autobiographical story detailing the events that occurred at her husband's lumberyard, and she used the pseudonym Jane Barrie.

In 1958, she achieved great success with her first novel Parrish. The book tells the story of a man who goes to work on a Connecticut tobacco farm. It was well-received and became a bestseller. It was subsequently made into a movie in 1961 starring Troy Donahue. In 1958, Ms. Savage appeared as a guest challenger on the TV panel show To Tell the Truth.

== Books ==
=== Fiction ===
- Parrish (1958)
- In Vivo (1964)
- Cirie (2002)

=== Non-fiction ===
- A Great Fall (1970)

=== Autobiographical ===
- The Lumberyard and Mrs. Barrie under pseudonym 'Jane Barrie'
