= Allen Kurzweil =

American novelist

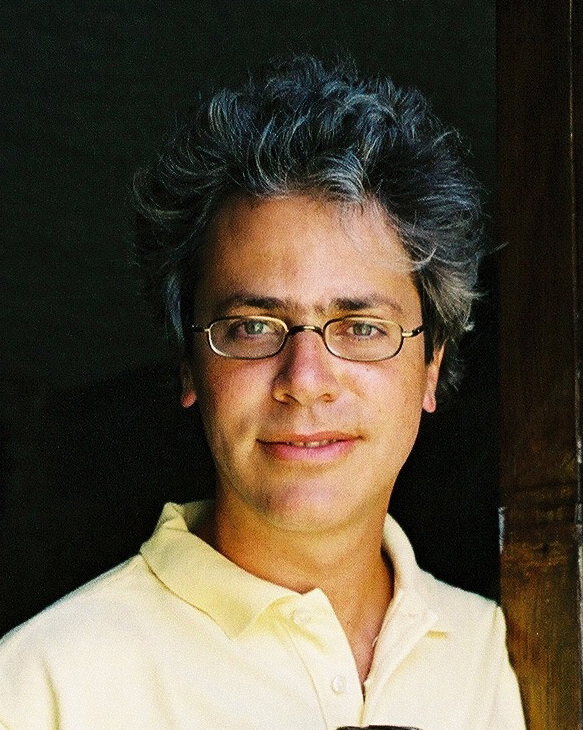
- Kurzweil
- Born: December 16, 1960 (age 65)
- Education: Aiglon College; Yale University; University of Rome
- Occupations: Novelist; journalist; editor; lecturer
- Writing career
- Notable works: A Case of Curiosities, Leon and the Spitting Image, Whipping Boy
- Website: www.allenkurzweil.com

Allen Kurzweil (born December 16, 1960) is an American novelist, journalist, editor, and lecturer. He is the author of four works of fiction, most notably A Case of Curiosities, as well as a memoir Whipping Boy. He is also the co-inventor, with his son Max, of Potato Chip Science, an eco-friendly experiment kit for grade schoolers. He is a cousin of Ray Kurzweil and brother of Vivien Schmidt.

== Life and career ==
The son of Viennese Jewish refugees, Kurzweil was raised in Europe and the United States. Educated at Aiglon College, Yale University and the University of Rome, he worked for ten years as a journalist in France, Italy, and Australia before settling in the United States. His first novel, A Case of Curiosities (1992), earned literary honors in England, Ireland, Italy, and France. His second novel, The Grand Complication, was published in 2001. Both works were included in The New York Times annual list of notable books. Kurzweil has written two award-winning children's books: Leon and the Spitting Image (2003), and Leon and the Champion Chip (2005), and, in 2015, published Whipping Boy: The Forty-Year Search for My Twelve-Year-Old Bully, an Edgar Award winning "investigative memoir."

As a journalist and essayist, Kurzweil has written articles and reviews for The New York Times, The Wall Street Journal, the Los Angeles Times, Smithsonian, the New Yorker, among other publications. He is also a freelance editor and writing professor. He has conducted seminars, workshops, and master classes in the United States and abroad. For many years he served on the boards of the Rhode Island Council for the Humanities and the Providence Athenaeum.

== Fellowships and awards ==
Kurzweil has received fellowships from the National Endowment for the Arts, the Fulbright Program, the Guggenheim Foundation, the New York Public Library Center for Scholars and Writers, and the John Nicholas Brown Center for the Public Humanities and Cultural Heritage.

A Case of Curiosities, a finalist for the Prix Médicis and the Irish Times/Aer Lingus International Fiction Prize, received the Premio Grinzane Cavour in 1993. In 1996 he was selected as one of Granta's Best Young American Novelists. His memoir, Whipping Boy: The Forty-Year Search for My Twelve-Year-Old Bully, originally published as a personal history in the New Yorker, in 2016 received the Edgar Award in the category of "Best Fact Crime."

== Bibliography ==
- A Case of Curiosities (1992)
- The Grand Complication (2001)
- Leon and the Spitting Image (2003)
- Leon and the Champion Chip (2005)
- Potato Chip Science (2010)
- Whipping Boy: The Forty-Year Search for My Twelve-Year-Old Bully (2015)
