= List of biographical films of the 2010s =

The following is a list of biographical films released of 2010s.

== 2010 ==
Film	Subject(s)	Portrayed by
127 Hours	Aron Ralston	James Franco
The 5th Quarter	Jon Abbate	Ryan Merriman
American: The Bill Hicks Story	Bill Hicks	Bill Hicks
Angel of Evil	Renato Vallanzasca	Kim Rossi Stuart
The Bang Bang Club	Greg Marinovich	Ryan Phillippe
The Bang Bang Club	Kevin Carter	Taylor Kitsch
The Bang Bang Club	Ken Oosterbroek	Frank Rautenbach
The Bang Bang Club	João Silva	Neels Van Jaarsveld
Bruce Lee, My Brother	Bruce Lee	Aarif Lee
Casino Jack	Jack Abramoff	Kevin Spacey
Chico Xavier	Chico Xavier	Nelson Xavier
Confucius	Confucius	Chow Yun-fat
Conviction	Betty Anne Waters	Hilary Swank
Cornelis	Cornelis Vreeswijk	Hank von Hell
The Day the Music Died	Buddy Holly	Guy Kent
Eat Pray Love	Elizabeth Gilbert	Julia Roberts
Edith Stein: The Seventh Chamber	Edith Stein	Maia Morgenstern
Florence/Nightingale	Florence Nightingale	Sheryl King
The End Is My Beginning	Tiziano Terzani	Bruno Ganz
Malik Ek	Sai Baba of Shirdi	Jackie Shroff
Extraordinary Measures	John Crowley	Brendan Fraser
Fair Game	Valerie Plame	Naomi Watts
Fair Game	Joseph Wilson	Sean Penn
The Fighter	"Irish" Micky Ward	Mark Wahlberg
The Fighter	Dicky Eklund	Christian Bale
The First Grader	Kimani Maruge	Oliver Litondo
Frankie & Alice	Frankie Murdoch	Halle Berry (older); Vanessa Morgan (teen); Michayla McKenzie (young)
Gainsbourg: A Heroic Life	Serge Gainsbourg	Éric Elmosnino
Gainsbourg: A Heroic Life	Jane Birkin	Lucy Gordon
Gainsbourg: A Heroic Life	Brigitte Bardot	Laetitia Casta
The Great Vazquez	Manuel Vázquez Gallego	Santiago Segura
Montevideo, God Bless You!	Aleksandar Tirnanić	Miloš Biković
Montevideo, God Bless You!	Blagoje Marjanović	Petar Strugar
The Hammer	Matt Hamill	Russell Harvard
Hidalgo: la historia jamás contada	Miguel Hidalgo y Costilla	Demián Bichir
Howl	Allen Ginsberg	James Franco
I Love You Phillip Morris	Steven Jay Russell	Jim Carrey
I Love You Phillip Morris	Phillip Morris	Ewan McGregor
Ip Man 2	Ip Man	Donnie Yen
Iron Lord	Yaroslav the Wise	Alexander Ivashkevich
Jew Suss: Rise and Fall	Ferdinand Marian	Tobias Moretti
The Kingdom of Solomon	Solomon	Amin Zendegani
The King's Speech	King George VI	Colin Firth
The King's Speech	Lionel Logue	Geoffrey Rush
The King's Speech	Elizabeth Bowes-Lyon	Helena Bonham Carter
The Legend Is Born: Ip Man	Ip Man	Dennis To
Leonie	Leonie Gilmour	Emily Mortimer
Lennon Naked	John Lennon	Christopher Eccleston
Letters to God	Tyler Doherty	Tanner Maguire
Letters to God	Samantha Perryfield	Bailee Madison
Lope	Lope de Vega	Alberto Ammann
Lula, the son of Brazil	Luiz Inácio Lula da Silva	Rui Ricardo Dias
Mahler on the Couch	Gustav Mahler	Johannes Silberschneider
Mahler on the Couch	Alma Mahler	Barbara Romaner
Max Schmeling	Max Schmeling	Henry Maske
Miral	Miral	Freida Pinto
Miral	Hind al-Husseini	Hiam Abbass
Mr. Nice	Howard Marks	Rhys Ifans
Nanga Parbat	Reinhold Messner	Florian Stetter
Nanga Parbat	Günther Messner	Andreas Tobias
Oranges and Sunshine	Margaret Humphreys	Emily Watson
Risen	Howard Winstone	Stuart Brennan
The Robber	Johann Kastenberger	Andreas Lust
The Runaways	Joan Jett	Kristen Stewart
The Runaways	Cherie Currie	Dakota Fanning
The Secret Diaries of Miss Anne Lister	Anne Lister	Maxine Peake
Secretariat	Penny Chenery	Diane Lane
Secretariat	Lucien Laurin	John Malkovich
Sex & Drugs & Rock & Roll	Ian Dury	Andy Serkis
The Social Network	Mark Zuckerberg	Jesse Eisenberg
The Social Network	Eduardo Saverin	Andrew Garfield
The Social Network	Sean Parker	Justin Timberlake
The Social Network	Cameron & Tyler Winklevoss	Armie Hammer
The Special Relationship	Bill Clinton	Dennis Quaid
The Special Relationship	Tony Blair	Michael Sheen
Temple Grandin	Temple Grandin	Claire Danes
Times You Change	Bushido	Elyas M'Barek
Toast	Nigel Slater	Freddie Highmore (teen); Oscar Kennedy (young)
Van Gogh: Painted with Words	Vincent van Gogh	Benedict Cumberbatch
Veda	Mustafa Kemal Atatürk	Sinan Tuzcu
Vision - From the Life of Hildegard von Bingen	Hildegard von Bingen	Barbara Sukowa
When Love Is Not Enough: The Lois Wilson Story	Lois Wilson	Winona Ryder
Who Is Clark Rockefeller?	Christian Gerhartsreiter	Eric McCormack
You Don't Know Jack	Jack Kevorkian	Al Pacino

== 2011 ==
Film	Subject(s)	Portrayed by
17 Miracles	Levi Savage Jr.	Jasen Wade
A Yell From Heaven	Hikaru Nakasone	Hiroshi Abe
Bernie	Bernie Tiede	Jack Black
The Amanda Knox Story	Amanda Knox	Hayden Panettiere
Bakhita: From Slave to Saint	Josephine Bakhita	Fatou Kine Boye
Beyond the Blackboard	Stacey Bess	Emily VanCamp
Black Butterflies	Ingrid Jonker	Carice van Houten
Cinema Verite	Pat Loud	Diane Lane
Cinema Verite	Bill Loud	Tim Robbins
Cinema Verite	Lance Loud	Thomas Dekker
Citizen Gangster	Edwin Alonzo Boyd	Scott Speedman
Confessions of a Brazilian Call Girl	Bruna Surfistinha	Deborah Secco
A Dangerous Method	Sigmund Freud	Viggo Mortensen
A Dangerous Method	Carl Gustav Jung	Michael Fassbender
A Dangerous Method	Sabina Spielrein	Keira Knightley
The Devil's Double	Latif Yahia / Uday Hussein	Dominic Cooper
From the Rough	Catana Starks	Taraji P. Henson
A Funny Man	Dirch Passer	Nikolaj Lie Kaas
The Intouchables	Philippe Pozzo di Borgo	François Cluzet
The Intouchables	Bakary "Driss" Bassari(Abdel Sellou)	Omar Sy
Hattie	Hattie Jacques	Ruth Jones
Heleno	Heleno de Freitas	Rodrigo Santoro
Higher Ground	Corinne Walker	Vera Farmiga
Holy Flying Circus	John Cleese	Darren Boyd
Holy Flying Circus	Michael Palin	Charles Edwards
Holy Flying Circus	Eric Idle	Steve Punt
Holy Flying Circus	Terry Jones	Rufus Jones
Holy Flying Circus	Graham Chapman	Tom Fisher
Holy Flying Circus	Terry Gilliam	Phil Nichol
Hür Adam: Bediüzzaman Said Nursi	Said Nursî	Mursit Bag
Isoroku	Admiral Isoroku Yamamoto	Koji Yakusho
J. Edgar	J. Edgar Hoover	Leonardo DiCaprio
Jeanne Captive	Joan of Arc	Clémence Poésy
Juan y Eva	Juan Perón	Osmar Nuñez
Juan y Eva	Eva Perón	Julieta Díaz
Magic Beyond Words	J. K. Rowling	Poppy Montgomery
Natalee Holloway	Natalee Holloway	Amy Gumenick
Natalee Holloway	Beth Holloway	Tracy Pollan
Natalee Holloway	Joran van der Sloot	Stephen Amell
Ramabai Bhimrao Ambedkar	Ramabai Ambedkar	Nisha Parulekar
Ramabai Bhimrao Ambedkar	B. R. Ambedkar	Ganesh Jethe
Snowtown	John Bunting	Daniel Henshall
Snowtown	James "Jamie" Vlassakis	Lucas Pittaway
Snowtown	Robert Wagner	Aaron Viergever
Snowtown	Mark Haydon	David Walker
Killing Pablo	Pablo Escobar	Édgar Ramírez
Kill the Irishman	Danny Greene	Ray Stevenson
The Lady	Aung San Suu Kyi	Michelle Yeoh
The Last Ride	Hank Williams	Henry Thomas
The Dirty Picture	Silk Smitha	Vidya Balan
Dschungelkind	Sabine Kuegler	Sina Tkotsch (adult); Stella Kunkat (young)
No One Killed Jessica	Jessica Lal	Myra Karn
The Lost Bladesman	Guan Yu	Donnie Yen
Moneyball	Billy Beane	Brad Pitt
Hugo	Georges Méliès	Ben Kingsley
Hugo	Jeanne d'Alcy	Helen McCrory
My Week With Marilyn	Marilyn Monroe	Michelle Williams
Anonymous	Edward de Vere, 17th Earl of Oxford	Rhys Ifans (older); Jamie Campbell Bower (young)
Anonymous	Elizabeth I	Vanessa Redgrave (older); Joely Richardson (young)
The Sky of My Childhood	Nursultan Nazarbayev	Elzhas Albiyev
Perfect Game	Choi Dong-won	Cho Seung-woo
Perfect Game	Sun Dong-yeol	Yang Dong-geun
Red Dog	Red Dog	Koko
Sal	Sal Mineo	Val Lauren
Soul Surfer	Bethany Hamilton	AnnaSophia Robb
Tatsumi	Yoshihiro Tatsumi	Yoshihiro Tatsumi
Kaze no Shounen	Yutaka Ozaki	Hiroki Narimiya
Violeta	Violeta Parra	Francisca Gavilán
W.E.	Wally Winthrop	Abbie Cornish
W.E.	Wallis Simpson	Andrea Riseborough
W.E.	Edward VIII	James D'Arcy
We Bought a Zoo	Benjamin Mee	Matt Damon
Winnie	Winnie Mandela	Jennifer Hudson
Winnie	Nelson Mandela	Terrence Howard
William & Kate	Prince William	Nico Evers-Swindell
William & Kate	Catherine Middleton	Camilla Luddington
The Woman Knight of Mirror Lake	Qiu Jin	Huang Yi

== 2012 ==
Film	Subject(s)	Portrayed by
11/25 The Day Mishima Chose His Own Fate	Yukio Mishima	Arata Iura
11/25 The Day Mishima Chose His Own Fate	Masakatsu Morita	Shinnosuke Mitsushima
11/25 The Day Mishima Chose His Own Fate	Hiroyasu Koga	Takatsugu Iwama
11/25 The Day Mishima Chose His Own Fate	Masayoshi Koga	Tasuku Nagaoka
11/25 The Day Mishima Chose His Own Fate	Masahiro Ogawa	Suzunosuke
11/25 The Day Mishima Chose His Own Fate	Otoya Yamaguchi	Soran Tamoto
11/25 The Day Mishima Chose His Own Fate	Yoko Hiraoka	Shinobu Terajima
11/25 The Day Mishima Chose His Own Fate	Hiroshi Mochimaru	Kiyohiko Shibukawa
Abducted: The Carlina White Story	Carlina White	Keke Palmer
My Way	Claude François	Jérémie Renier
My Way	France Gall	Joséphine Japy
My Way	Frank Sinatra	Robert Knepper
Unconditional	Samantha Crawford	Lynn Collins
Unconditional	"Papa Joe" Bradford	Michael Ealy
Argo	Tony Mendez	Ben Affleck
As One	Hyun Jung-hwa	Ha Ji-won
As One	Ri Pun-hui	Bae Doona
A Royal Affair	Caroline Matilda of Great Britain	Alicia Vikander
A Royal Affair	Johann Friedrich Struensee	Mads Mikkelsen
A Royal Affair	Christian VII	Mikkel Følsgaard
Bill W.	Bill W.	Blake J. Evans (older); Max Owens (young)
Emperor	Bonner Fellers	Matthew Fox
Emperor	Douglas MacArthur	Tommy Lee Jones
Falling Flowers	Xiao Hong	Song Jia
Florbela	Florbela Espanca	Dalila Carmo
The Girl	Alfred Hitchcock	Toby Jones
The Girl	Tippi Hedren	Sienna Miller
The Impossible	Maria Bennett	Naomi Watts
Game Change	Sarah Palin	Julianne Moore
Game Change	John McCain	Ed Harris
Bert and Dickie	Dickie Burnell	Sam Hoare
Bert and Dickie	Bert Bushnell	Matt Smith
Ivan Megharoopan	P. Kunhiraman Nair	Prakash Bare
National Security	Kim Jong-tae	Park Won-sang
To Write Love on Her Arms	Renee Yohe	Kat Dennings (older); Lindsey Riesen (teen); Isabella Iannuzzi (young)
Sri Ramakrishna Darshanam	Ramakrishna	Sashikumar
Hannah Arendt	Hannah Arendt	Barbara Sukowa
Hitchcock	Alfred Hitchcock	Anthony Hopkins
Hyde Park on Hudson	Franklin Delano Roosevelt	Bill Murray
Hyde Park on Hudson	Margaret Suckley	Laura Linney
Lawless	Jack Bondaurant	Shia LaBeouf
Lawless	Forest Bondaurant	Tom Hardy
Lawless	Howard Bondaurant	Jason Clarke
A Smile as Big as the Moon	Mike Kersjes	John Corbett
The Iceman	Richard Kuklinski	Michael Shannon
Paan Singh Tomar	Paan Singh Tomar	Irrfan Khan
The Iron Lady	Margaret Thatcher	Meryl Streep
Lincoln	Abraham Lincoln	Daniel Day-Lewis
The Consul of Bordeaux	Aristides de Sousa Mendes	Vítor Norte
Renoir	Pierre-Auguste Renoir	Michel Bouquet
Renoir	Catherine Hessling	Christa Théret
Renoir	Jean Renoir	Vincent Rottiers
Soegija	Albertus Soegijapranata	Nirwan Dewanto

== 2013 ==
Film	Subject(s)	Portrayed by
An Adventure in Space and Time	William Hartnell	David Bradley
An Adventure in Space and Time	Sydney Newman	Brian Cox
An Adventure in Space and Time	Verity Lambert	Jessica Raine
An Adventure in Space and Time	Waris Hussein	Sacha Dhawan
An Adventure in Space and Time	Heather Hartnell	Lesley Manville
Ask This of Rikyu	Sen no Rikyū	Ichikawa Ebizō XI
The Bling Ring	Rachel Lee	Katie Chang
The Bling Ring	Nick Prugo	Israel Broussard
The Bling Ring	Alexis Neiers	Emma Watson
The Bling Ring	Tess Taylor	Taissa Farmiga
The Bling Ring	Courtney Ames	Claire Julien
Blue Caprice	John Allen Muhammad	Isaiah Washington
Blue Caprice	Lee Boyd Malvo	Tequan Richmond
CBGB	Hilly Kristal	Alan Rickman
House of Versace	Donatella Versace	Gina Gershon
House of Versace	Gianni Versace	Enrico Colantoni
House of Versace	Santo Versace	Colm Feore
House of Versace	Allegra Versace	Samantha Hodhod
Jappeloup	Pierre Durand, Jr.	Guillaume Canet
Jodi Arias: Dirty Little Secret	Jodi Arias	Tania Raymonde
Jodi Arias: Dirty Little Secret	Travis Alexander	Jesse Lee Soffer
The Jungle School	Butet Manurung	Prisia Nasution
Liz & Dick	Elizabeth Taylor	Lindsay Lohan
Liz & Dick	Richard Burton	Grant Bowler
42	Jackie Robinson	Chadwick Boseman
42	Branch Rickey	Harrison Ford
Letters to Sofija	Mikalojus Konstantinas Čiurlionis	Rokas Zubovas
The Liberator	Simón Bolívar	Édgar Ramírez
Lone Survivor	Marcus Luttrell	Mark Wahlberg
Lone Survivor	Michael P. Murphy	Taylor Kitsch
Lone Survivor	Danny Dietz	Emile Hirsch
Lone Survivor	Matthew Axelson	Ben Foster
Lone Survivor	Erik S. Kristensen	Eric Bana
Kill Your Darlings	Allen Ginsberg	Daniel Radcliffe
The Frozen Ground	Robert Hansen	John Cusack
Crazy, Sexy, Cool: The TLC Story	Tionne Watkins	Drew Sidora
Crazy, Sexy, Cool: The TLC Story	Lisa Lopes	Lil Mama
Crazy, Sexy, Cool: The TLC Story	Rozonda Thomas	Keke Palmer
Legend № 17	Valeri Kharlamov	Danila Kozlovsky
Big Sur	Jack Kerouac	Jean-Marc Barr
The Look of Love	Paul Raymond	Steve Coogan
Diana	Diana, Princess of Wales	Naomi Watts
Celluloid	J. C. Daniel	Prithviraj Sukumaran
Ephraim's Rescue	Ephraim Hanks	Darin Southam
The Railway Man	Eric Lomax	Colin Firth (older); Jeremy Irvine (young)
The Railway Man	Takashi Nagase	Hiroyuki Sanada (older); Tanroh Ishida (young)
The Grandmaster	Ip Man	Tony Leung Chiu-Wai
Jobs	Steve Jobs	Ashton Kutcher
Bhaag Milkha Bhaag	Milkha Singh	Farhan Akhtar
The Devil's Violinist	Niccolò Paganini	David Garrett
Captain Phillips	Richard Phillips	Tom Hanks
Like the Wind	Armida Miserere	Valeria Golino
Lovelace	Linda Lovelace	Amanda Seyfried
Lovelace	Chuck Traynor	Peter Sarsgaard
The Invisible Woman	Charles Dickens	Ralph Fiennes
Meghe Dhaka Tara	Nilkantha Bagchi	Saswata Chatterjee
Behind the Candelabra	Liberace	Michael Douglas
One Chance	Paul Potts	James Corden
Romeo Killer: The Chris Porco Story	Christopher Porco	Matt Barr
Saving Mr. Banks	P.L. Travers	Emma Thompson
Saving Mr. Banks	Walt Disney	Tom Hanks
The Last of Robin Hood	Errol Flynn	Kevin Kline
Rush	James Hunt	Chris Hemsworth
Rush	Niki Lauda	Daniel Brühl
Dallas Buyers Club	Ron Woodroof	Matthew McConaughey
Jimi: All Is by My Side	Jimi Hendrix	André Benjamin
The Butler	Cecil Gaines	Forest Whitaker
A Journey of Samyak Buddha	Gautama Buddha	Abhishek Urade
Mandela: Long Walk to Freedom	Nelson Mandela	Idris Elba
12 Years a Slave	Solomon Northup	Chiwetel Ejiofor
Marina	Rocco Granata	Matteo Simoni
The Fifth Estate	Julian Assange	Benedict Cumberbatch
The Fifth Estate	Daniel Domscheit-Berg	Daniel Brühl
Summer in February	Alfred Munnings	Dominic Cooper
Summer in February	Florence Carter-Wood	Emily Browning
Summer in February	Gilbert Evans	Dan Stevens
Summer in February	Laura Knight	Hattie Morahan
Summer in February	Harold Knight	Shaun Dingwall
The Wolf of Wall Street	Jordan Belfort	Leonardo DiCaprio
American Hustle	Melvin Weinberg	Christian Bale
American Hustle	Anthony Amoroso Jr.	Bradley Cooper
Gagarin: First in Space	Yuri Gagarin	Yaroslav Zhalnin
Waltz for Monica	Monica Zetterlund	Edda Magnason
Grace of Monaco	Grace Kelly	Nicole Kidman
The Wind Rises	Jiro Horikoshi	Hideaki Anno (Japanese voice); Joseph Gordon-Levitt (English voice)

== 2014 ==
Film	Subject(s)	Portrayed by
Noah	Noah	Russell Crowe (older); Dakota Goyo (young)
Foxcatcher	John Eleuthère du Pont	Steve Carell
Foxcatcher	Mark Schultz	Channing Tatum
Foxcatcher	Dave Schultz	Mark Ruffalo
The Internet's Own Boy: The Story of Aaron Swartz	Aaron Swartz	Aaron Swartz (archive footage)
Set Fire to the Stars	Dylan Thomas	Celyn Jones
Set Fire to the Stars	John Malcolm Brinnin	Elijah Wood
Saint Laurent	Yves Saint Laurent	Gaspard Ulliel (young) and Helmut Berger (old)
Cesar Chavez	Cesar Chavez	Michael Peña
Pasolini	Pier Paolo Pasolini	Willem Dafoe
The Admiral: Roaring Currents	Yi Sun-sin	Choi Min-sik
Wild	Cheryl Strayed	Reese Witherspoon
Electric Slide	Eddie Dodson	Jim Sturgess
Bonifacio: Ang Unang Pangulo	Andrés Bonifacio	Robin Padilla (older); Joshua Lichtenberg (young)
Escobar: Paradise Lost	Pablo Escobar	Benicio del Toro
The Outlaw Michael Howe	Michael Howe	Damon Herriman
Effie Gray	Effie Gray	Dakota Fanning
Effie Gray	John Ruskin	Greg Wise
Jersey Boys	Frankie Valli	John Lloyd Young
Jersey Boys	Bob Gaudio	Erich Bergen
Jersey Boys	Nick Massi	Michael Lomenda
Jersey Boys	Tommy DeVito	Vincent Piazza
Beloved Sisters	Friedrich Schiller	Florian Stetter
Beloved Sisters	Charlotte von Lengefeld	Henriette Confurius
Beloved Sisters	Caroline von Wolzogen	Hannah Herzsprung
When the Game Stands Tall	Bob Ladouceur	Jim Caviezel
The Great Victory	Max Trombini	Caio Castro (older); Felipe Falanga (young)
See You in Montevideo	Aleksandar Tirnanić	Miloš Biković
See You in Montevideo	Blagoje Marjanović	Petar Strugar
Accused	Lucia de Berk	Ariane Schluter
Million Dollar Arm	J. B. Bernstein	Jon Hamm
Million Dollar Arm	Ash Vasudevan	Aasif Mandvi
Million Dollar Arm	Rinku Singh	Suraj Sharma
Million Dollar Arm	Dinesh Patel	Madhur Mittal
Million Dollar Arm	Tom House	Bill Paxton
Testament of Youth	Vera Brittain	Alicia Vikander
Testament of Youth	Roland Leighton	Kit Harington
Testament of Youth	Victor Richardson	Colin Morgan
Testament of Youth	Edward Brittain	Taron Egerton
Gods	Zbigniew Religa	Tomasz Kot
American Sniper	Chris Kyle	Bradley Cooper
Kill the Messenger	Gary Webb	Jeremy Renner
Get On Up	James Brown	Chadwick Boseman
Big Eyes	Margaret Keane	Amy Adams
Big Eyes	Walter Keane	Christoph Waltz
Mr. Turner	J. M. W. Turner	Timothy Spall
Marvellous	Neil Baldwin	Toby Jones
Selma	Martin Luther King Jr.	David Oyelowo
Selma	James Bevel	Common
Heaven Is for Real	Colton Burpo	Connor Corum
Heaven Is for Real	Todd Burpo	Greg Kinnear
Unbroken	Louis Zamperini	Jack O'Connell
The Gabby Douglas Story	Gabby Douglas	Sydney Mikayla(7–12 years old) and Imani Hakim (13–16 years old)
Getúlio	Getúlio Vargas	Tony Ramos
Che	Mostafa Chamran	Fariborz Arabnia
The Imitation Game	Alan Turing	Benedict Cumberbatch (older); Alex Lawther (young)
Desert Dancer	Afshin Ghaffarian	Reece Ritchie
Lizzie Borden Took An Ax	Lizzie Borden	Christina Ricci
House of Manson	Charles Manson	Ryan Kiser
Rob the Mob	Tommy Uva	Michael Pitt
Rob the Mob	Rosie Uva	Nina Arianda
Love & Mercy	Brian Wilson	Paul Dano and John Cusack
The Letters	Mother Teresa	Juliet Stevenson
Não Pare na Pista	Paulo Coelho	Júlio Andrade
Yves Saint Laurent	Yves Saint Laurent	Pierre Niney
Tim Maia	Tim Maia	Robson Nunes and Babu Santana
Amour Fou	Heinrich von Kleist	Christian Friedel
Mary Kom	Mary Kom	Priyanka Chopra
Aaliyah: The Princess of R&B	Aaliyah	Alexandra Shipp
Rang Rasiya	Raja Ravi Varma	Randeep Hooda
The Theory of Everything	Stephen Hawking	Eddie Redmayne
The Tenor – Lirico Spinto	Bae Jae-chul	Yoo Ji-tae
Pride	Mark Ashton	Ben Schnetzer

== 2015 ==
Film	Subject(s)	Portrayed by
10 Days in a Madhouse	Nellie Bly	Caroline Barry
Bessie	Bessie Smith	Queen Latifah
The Big Short	Michael Burry	Christian Bale
Bloed, zweet & tranen	André Hazes	Martijn Fischer
Born to Be Blue	Chet Baker	Ethan Hawke
Chiamatemi Francesco	Pope Francis	Sergio Hernández (older); Rodrigo de la Serna (young)
Cleveland Abduction	Michelle Knight	Taryn Manning
Cleveland Abduction	Amanda Berry	Samantha Droke
Cleveland Abduction	Gina DeJesus	Katie Sarife
Cleveland Abduction	Ariel Castro	Raymond Cruz
M. S. Dhoni: The Untold Story	M. S. Dhoni	Sushant Singh Rajput
Woman in Gold	Maria Altmann	Helen Mirren (older); Tatiana Maslany (young)
Woman in Gold	E. Randol Schoenberg	Ryan Reynolds
Bajirao Mastani	Baji Rao I	Ranveer Singh
Bajirao Mastani	Mastani	Deepika Padukone
Bajirao Mastani	Kashibai	Priyanka Chopra
Black Mass	Whitey Bulger	Johnny Depp
The End of the Tour	David Foster Wallace	Jason Segel
The End of the Tour	David Lipsky	Jesse Eisenberg
Francis: Pray for Me	Jorge Bergoglio	Darío Grandinetti (older); Gabriel Gallichio (young)
Sommeren '92	Richard Møller Nielsen	Ulrich Thomsen
Anton Tchékhov 1890	Anton Chekhov	Nicolas Giraud
Walt Before Mickey	Walt Disney	Thomas Ian Nicholas
Straight Outta Compton	Eazy-E	Jason Mitchell
Straight Outta Compton	Dr. Dre	Corey Hawkins
Straight Outta Compton	Ice Cube	O'Shea Jackson Jr.
Straight Outta Compton	DJ Yella	Neil Brown Jr.
Straight Outta Compton	MC Ren	Aldis Hodge
Experimenter	Stanley Milgram	Peter Sarsgaard
Steve Jobs	Steve Jobs	Michael Fassbender
Truth	Dan Rather	Robert Redford
Truth	Mary Mapes	Cate Blanchett
We Will Be the World Champions	Nebojša Popović	Strahinja Blažić
We Will Be the World Champions	Borislav Stanković	Aleksandar Radojičić
We Will Be the World Champions	Radomir Šaper	Miloš Biković
We Will Be the World Champions	Aleksandar Nikolić	Marko Janketić
The Unauthorized Full House Story	Cast of Full House	Various actors
Michiel de Ruyter	Michiel de Ruyter	Frank Lammers
Persona Non Grata	Chiune Sugihara	Toshiaki Karasawa
Concussion	Bennet Omalu	Will Smith
Everest	Rob Hall	Jason Clarke
Everest	Scott Fischer	Jake Gyllenhaal
Everest	Beck Weathers	Josh Brolin
The 33	Mario Sepúlveda	Antonio Banderas
The 33	Jeff Hart	James Brolin
The 33	Luis Urzúa	Lou Diamond Phillips
Ip Man 3	Ip Man	Donnie Yen
Foujita	Tsuguharu Foujita	Joe Odagiri
The Walk	Philippe Petit	Joseph Gordon-Levitt
My All American	Freddie Joe Steinmark	Aaron Eckhart
The Gamechangers	Sam Houser	Daniel Radcliffe
The Gamechangers	Jack Thompson	Bill Paxton
Eisenstein in Guanajuato	Sergei Eisenstein	Elmer Bäck
Pawn Sacrifice	Bobby Fischer	Tobey Macguire
Kid Kulafu	Manny Pacquiao	Buboy Villar
Kidnapping Freddy Heineken	Freddy Heineken	Anthony Hopkins
Kidnapping Freddy Heineken	Willem Holleeder	Sam Worthington
Kidnapping Freddy Heineken	Cor van Hout	Jim Sturgess
Life	Dennis Stock	Robert Pattinson
Life	James Dean	Dane DeHaan
McFarland, USA	James White	Kevin Costner
Manjhi - The Mountain Man	Dashrath Manjhi	Nawazuddin Siddiqui
The Man Who Knew Infinity	Srinivasa Ramanujan	Dev Patel
The Program	Lance Armstrong	Ben Foster
Ownerless Flower Uhwudong	Uhwudong	Kang Eun-bi
Legend	Kray Twins	Tom Hardy
The Unauthorized Beverly Hills, 90210 Story	Cast of Beverly Hills, 90210	Various actors
Heneral Luna	Antonio Luna	John Arcilla
The Unauthorized Melrose Place Story	Cast of Melrose Place	Various actors
Spotlight	Michael Rezendes	Mark Ruffalo
Spotlight	Walter "Robby" Robinson	Michael Keaton
Spotlight	Sacha Pfeiffer	Rachel McAdams
Spotlight	Martin Baron	Liev Schreiber
Spotlight	Ben Bradlee Jr.	John Slattery
Spotlight	Matt Carroll	Brian d'Arcy James
Woodlawn	Tony Nathan	Caleb Castille
Woodlawn	Tandy Gerelds	Nic Bishop
Woodlawn	Hank Erwin	Sean Astin
Felix Manalo	Felix Ysagun Manalo	Dennis Trillo
Queen of the Desert	Gertrude Bell	Nicole Kidman
Trumbo	Dalton Trumbo	Bryan Cranston
The People vs. Fritz Bauer	Fritz Bauer	Burghart Klaußner
The Danish Girl	Einar Wegener/Lili Elbe	Eddie Redmayne
The Danish Girl	Gerda Wegener	Alicia Vikander
In the Heart of the Sea	Owen Chase	Chris Hemsworth
In the Heart of the Sea	George Pollard Jr.	Benjamin Walker
In the Heart of the Sea	Thomas Nickerson	Tom Holland (young), Brendan Gleeson (older)
Freeheld	Laurel Hester	Julianne Moore
Joy	Joy Mangano	Jennifer Lawrence (older), Isabella Cramp (younger)
The Revenant	Hugh Glass	Leonardo DiCaprio
Maharaja Gemunu	Dutugemunu	Uddhika Premarathne
The Sound of a Flower	Shin Jae-hyo	Ryu Seung-ryong
The Sound of a Flower	Jin Chae-seon	Bae Suzy
Dolly Parton's Coat of Many Colors	Dolly Parton	Alyvia Alyn Lind
Main Aur Charles	Charles Sobhraj	Randeep Hooda
Main Aur Charles	Amod Kanth	Adil Hussain

== 2016 ==
Film	Subject(s)	Portrayed by
Maudie	Maud Lewis	Sally Hawkins
13 Hours: The Secret Soldiers of Benghazi	Members of the Battle of Benghazi Defense Team	Various Actors
Bole India Jai Bhim	L. N. Hardas	Vijay Gite
Bole India Jai Bhim	B. R. Ambedkar	Shyam Bhimsaria
Dongju: The Portrait of a Poet	Yun Dong-ju	Kang Ha-neul
Hail, Caesar!	Eddie Mannix	Josh Brolin
Genius	Maxwell Perkins	Colin Firth
Genius	Thomas Wolfe	Jude Law
Genius	Aline Bernstein	Nicole Kidman
Genius	Ernest Hemingway	Dominic West
Genius	F. Scott Fitzgerald	Guy Pearce
Loving	Richard Loving	Joel Edgerton
Loving	Mildred Loving	Ruth Negga
Race	Jesse Owens	Stephan James
El Inca	Edwin Valero	Alexander Leterni
Ek Thi Marium	Marium Mukhtiar	Sanam Baloch
Ramabai	Ramabai Ambedkar	Yagna Shetty
Ramabai	B. R. Ambedkar	Siddaram Karnik
Surviving Compton: Dre, Suge & Michel'le	Michel'le	Rhyon Nicole Brown
Surviving Compton: Dre, Suge & Michel'le	Jerry Heller	Jamie Kennedy
The Siege of Jadotville	Pat Quinlan	Jamie Dornan
I'm Gilda	Gilda	Natalia Oreiro
Toni Braxton: Unbreak My Heart	Toni Braxton	Lex Scott Davis
Greater	Brandon Burlsworth	Christopher Severio
Queen of Katwe	Phiona Mutesi	Madina Nalwanga
All the Way	Lyndon B. Johnson	Bryan Cranston
All the Way	Martin Luther King Jr.	Anthony Mackie
Miles Ahead	Miles Davis	Don Cheadle
The Exception	Wilhelm II	Christopher Plummer
I Saw the Light	Hank Williams	Tom Hiddleston
Confirmation	Anita Hill	Kerry Washington
Cézanne and I	Émile Zola	Guillaume Canet
Cézanne and I	Paul Cézanne	Guillaume Gallienne
I'm Not Ashamed	Rachel Scott	Masey McLain
Red Dog: True Blue	Red Dog	Phoenix
Pelé: Birth of a Legend	Pelé	Kevin de Paula
Altamira	Marcelino Sanz de Sautuola	Antonio Banderas
Miracles from Heaven	Christy Beam	Jennifer Garner
Miracles from Heaven	Anna Beam	Kylie Rogers
Houdini and Doyle	Harry Houdini	Michael Weston
Houdini and Doyle	Arthur Conan Doyle	Stephen Mangan
Egon Schiele: Death and the Maiden	Egon Schiele	Noah Saavedra
Dolly Parton's Christmas of Many Colors: Circle of Love	Dolly Parton	Alyvia Alyn Lind
Nina	Nina Simone	Zoe Saldaña
Chocolat	Chocolat	Omar Sy
Chocolat	George Foottit	James Thiérrée
The Legend of Ben Hall	Ben Hall	Jack Martin
The Legend of Ben Hall	John Gilbert	Jamie Coffa
The Legend of Ben Hall	John Dunn	William Lee
Florence Foster Jenkins	Florence Foster Jenkins	Meryl Streep
Hands of Stone	Roberto Durán	Édgar Ramírez
Hands of Stone	Ray Arcel	Robert De Niro
Snowden	Edward Snowden	Joseph Gordon-Levitt
USS Indianapolis: Men of Courage	Charles B. McVay III	Nicolas Cage
The Infiltrator	Robert Mazur	Bryan Cranston
The Night Stalker	Richard Ramirez	Lou Diamond Phillips
Masterminds	David Ghantt	Zach Galifianakis
Xuanzang	Xuanzang	Huang Xiaoming
War Dogs	Efraim Diveroli	Jonah Hill
War Dogs	David Packouz	Miles Teller
The Chronicles of Melanie	Melānija Vanaga	Sabine Timoteo
The Odyssey	Jacques Cousteau	Lambert Wilson
Denial	Deborah Lipstadt	Rachel Weisz
Birth of the Dragon	Bruce Lee	Philip Ng
Birth of the Dragon	Wong Jack Man	Xia Yu
Hacksaw Ridge	Desmond Doss	Andrew Garfield
Lion	Saroo Brierley	Dev Patel
Neruda	Pablo Neruda	Luis Gnecco
Sully	Chesley Sullenberger	Tom Hanks
Christine	Christine Chubbuck	Rebecca Hall
Bleed for This	Vinny Pazienza	Miles Teller
Stronger than the World	José Aldo	José Loreto
Nelly	Nelly Arcan	Mylène Mackay
Azhar	Mohammad Azharuddin	Emraan Hashmi
Dangal	Mahavir Singh Phogat	Aamir Khan
Free State of Jones	Newton Knight	Matthew McConaughey
LBJ	Lyndon B. Johnson	Woody Harrelson
Elvis & Nixon	Richard Nixon	Kevin Spacey
Elvis & Nixon	Elvis Presley	Michael Shannon
Riphagen	Dries Riphagen	Pieter Kuijpers
The Birth of a Nation	Nat Turner	Nate Parker
The Dancer	Loie Fuller	Soko
Mah e Mir	Mir Taqi Mir	Fahad Mustafa
Barry	Barack Obama	Devon Terrell
Jackie	Jacqueline Kennedy	Natalie Portman
Brain on Fire	Susannah Cahalan	Chloë Grace Moretz
Eddie the Eagle	Eddie "The Eagle" Edwards	Taron Egerton
Hidden Figures	Katherine Johnson	Taraji P. Henson
Hidden Figures	Dorothy Vaughan	Octavia Spencer
Hidden Figures	Mary Jackson	Janelle Monáe
The Founder	Ray Kroc	Michael Keaton
A United Kingdom	Seretse Khama	David Oyelowo
A United Kingdom	Ruth Williams Khama	Rosamund Pike
Southside with You	Barack Obama	Parker Sawyers
Southside with You	Michelle Robinson	Tika Sumpter
Churchill	Winston Churchill	Brian Cox
Love Under New Management: The Miki Howard Story	Miki Howard	Teyonah Parris
Chuck	Chuck Wepner	Liev Schreiber
M.S. Dhoni: The Untold Story	Mahendra Singh Dhoni	Sushant Singh Rajput
Rudy Habibie	B. J. Habibie	Reza Rahadian
Anna	Anna Hazare	Shashank Udapurkar
Patriots Day	Commissioner Ed Davis	John Goodman
Patriots Day	FBI Agent Richard DesLauriers	Kevin Bacon
Patriots Day	Sgt. Jeffrey Pugliese	J.K. Simmons
Patriots Day	Massachusetts Governor Deval Patrick	Michael Beach
Patriots Day	Boston Mayor Thomas Menino	Vincent Curatola
Patriots Day	B.P. Superintendent William B. Evans	James Colby
Patriots Day	Dzhokhar Tsarnaev	Alex Wolff
Patriots Day	Tamerlan Tsarnaev	Themo Melikidze
Donald Trump's The Art of the Deal: The Movie	Donald Trump	Johnny Depp

== 2017 ==
Film	Subject(s)	Portrayed by
6 Below: Miracle on the Mountain	Eric LeMarque	Josh Hartnett
The Current War	Thomas Edison	Benedict Cumberbatch
The Current War	George Westinghouse	Michael Shannon
The Current War	Nikola Tesla	Nicholas Hoult
The Current War	Samuel Insull	Tom Holland
Most Hated Woman in America	Madalyn Murray O'Hair	Melissa Leo
Jungle	Yossi Ghinsberg	Daniel Radcliffe
My Name Is Lenny	Lenny McLean	Josh Helman
The Lost City of Z	Percy Fawcett	Charlie Hunnam
Rebel in the Rye	J. D. Salinger	Nicholas Hoult
Anarchist from Colony	Pak Yol	Lee Je-hoon
Anarchist from Colony	Fumiko Kaneko	Choi Hee-seo
The Wizard of Lies	Bernie Madoff	Robert De Niro
Django	Django Reinhardt	Reda Kateb
First They Killed My Father	Loung Ung	Sareum Srey Moch
Bomb City	Brian Deneke	Dave Davis
The Polka King	Jan Lewan	Jack Black
Darkest Hour	Winston Churchill	Gary Oldman
Love All You Have Left	Anne Frank	Sara Wolfkind
Babs	Barbara Windsor	Jaime Winstone
Loving Pablo	Pablo Escobar	Javier Bardem
Loving Pablo	Virginia Vallejo	Penélope Cruz
Rodin	Auguste Rodin	Vincent Lindon
Rodin	Camille Claudel	Izïa Higelin
Victoria & Abdul	Queen Victoria	Judi Dench
Victoria & Abdul	Abdul Karim	Ali Fazal
Detroit	Melvin Dismukes	John Boyega
Detroit	Larry Reed	Algee Smith
Detroit	Fred Temple	Jacob Latimore
Gotti	John Gotti	John Travolta
Breaking the Limits	Jerzy Górski	Jakub Gierszał
Dating Game Killer	Rodney Alcala	Guillermo Díaz
Gautamiputra Satakarni	Gautamiputra Satakarni	Nandamuri Balakrishna
Roxanne Roxanne	Roxanne Shante	Chanté Adams
England Is Mine	Morrissey	Jack Lowden
England Is Mine	Linder Sterling	Jessica Brown Findlay
England Is Mine	Johnny Marr	Laurie Kynaston
All Eyez on Me	Tupac Shakur	Demetrius Shipp Jr.
The Black Prince	Duleep Singh	Satinder Sartaaj
The Black Prince	Queen Victoria	Amanda Root
Molly's Game	Molly Bloom	Jessica Chastain
Megan Leavey	Megan Leavey	Kate Mara
Matilda	Mathilde Kschessinska	Michalina Olszańska
Matilda	Nicholas II of Russia	Lars Eidinger
The Zookeeper's Wife	Antonina Żabińska	Jessica Chastain
The Zookeeper's Wife	Jan Żabiński	Johan Heldenbergh
The Zookeeper's Wife	Lutz Heck	Daniel Brühl
Marshall	Thurgood Marshall	Chadwick Boseman
Mary Shelley	Mary Shelley	Elle Fanning
Mary Shelley	Percy Bysshe Shelley	Douglas Booth
American Made	Barry Seal	Tom Cruise
The Mercy	Donald Crowhurst	Colin Firth
Crown Heights	Colin Warner	Lakeith Stanfield
Crown Heights	Carl King	Nnamdi Asomugha
All Saints	Michael Spurlock	John Corbett
The Disaster Artist	Tommy Wiseau	James Franco
The Disaster Artist	Greg Sestero	Dave Franco
Stronger	Jeff Bauman	Jake Gyllenhaal
Breathe	Robin Cavendish	Andrew Garfield
Britney Ever After	Britney Spears	Natasha Bassett
The Greatest Showman	P.T. Barnum	Hugh Jackman
Woman Walks Ahead	Catherine Weldon	Jessica Chastain
Woman Walks Ahead	Sitting Bull	Michael Greyeyes
The Glass Castle	Jeannette Walls	Brie Larson
Billionaire Boys Club	Joe Hunt	Ansel Elgort
No Show Jones	George Jones	Josh Brolin
Papillon	Henri Charrière	Charlie Hunnam
Papillon	Louis Dega	Rami Malek
Promise at Dawn	Roman Kacew	Pierre Niney (older); Nemo Schiffman (teen); Pawel Puchalski (young)
The Immortal Life of Henrietta Lacks	Henrietta Lacks	Renée Elise Goldsberry
All the Money in the World	Gail Harris	Michelle Williams
All the Money in the World	J. Paul Getty	Christopher Plummer
All the Money in the World	John Paul Getty III	Charlie Plummer (older); Charlie Shotwell (young)
Borg McEnroe	Björn Borg	Sverrir Gudnason
Borg McEnroe	John McEnroe	Shia LaBeouf
Battle of the Sexes	Billie Jean King	Emma Stone
Battle of the Sexes	Bobby Riggs	Steve Carell
Michael Jackson: Searching for Neverland	Michael Jackson	Navi
Professor Marston and the Wonder Women	William Moulton Marston	Luke Evans
Professor Marston and the Wonder Women	Elizabeth Holloway Marston	Rebecca Hall
Professor Marston and the Wonder Women	Olive Byrne	Bella Heathcote
My Friend Dahmer	Jeffrey Dahmer	Ross Lynch
My Friend Dahmer	John "Derf" Backderf	Alex Wolff
Goodbye Christopher Robin	A. A. Milne	Domhnall Gleeson
Goodbye Christopher Robin	Christopher Robin Milne	Will Tilston (young); Alex Lawther (older)
Mark Felt: The Man Who Brought Down the White House	Mark Felt	Liam Neeson
Going Vertical	Vladimir Kondrashin	Vladimir Mashkov
I, Tonya	Tonya Harding	Margot Robbie (older); Mckenna Grace (young)
The Post	Katharine Graham	Meryl Streep
The Post	Ben Bradlee	Tom Hanks
Aloko Udapadi	Valagamba of Anuradhapura	Uddhika Premarathne
The Man with the Iron Heart	Reinhard Heydrich	Jason Clarke

== 2018 ==
Film	Subject(s)	Portrayed by
Red Joan	Joan Elizabeth Stanley	Judi Dench, Sophie Cookson (young)
Red Joan	Clement Attlee	Robin Soans
Outlaw King	Robert the Bruce	Chris Pine
Outlaw King	James Douglas, Lord of Douglas	Aaron Taylor-Johnson
Outlaw King	Elizabeth de Burgh	Florence Pugh
Outlaw King	Aonghus Óg of Islay	Tony Curran
Bal Bhimrao	B. R. Ambedkar	Manish Kamble
Acute Misfortune	Adam Cullen	Daniel Henshall
First Man	Neil Armstrong	Ryan Gosling
The Drug King	Lee Doo-sam	Song Kang-ho
Müslüm	Müslüm Gürses	Timuçin Esen (older); Şahin Kendirci (teen); Alper Parlak (young)
Can You Ever Forgive Me?	Lee Israel	Melissa McCarthy
A Private War	Marie Colvin	Rosamund Pike
Cocaine Godmother	Griselda Blanco	Catherine Zeta-Jones (older); Isabella Sierra (young)
A Futile and Stupid Gesture	Douglas Kenney	Will Forte
Lizzie	Lizzie Borden	Chloë Sevigny
Becoming Astrid	Astrid Lindgren	Alba August (young); Maria Fahl Vikander (older)
Traffic Ramasamy	Traffic Ramaswamy	S.A. Chandrasekhar
3 Days in Quiberon	Romy Schneider	Marie Bäumer
Beautiful Boy	David Sheff	Steve Carell
Beautiful Boy	Nic Sheff	Timothée Chalamet
Dovlatov	Sergei Dovlatov	Milan Marić
Lords of Chaos	Øystein Aarseth	Rory Culkin
Lords of Chaos	Kristian Vikernes	Emory Cohen
Lords of Chaos	Pelle Ohlin	Jack Kilmer
Hurricane	Jan Zumbach	Iwan Rheon
Hurricane	John A. Kent	Milo Gibson
The Old Man & the Gun	Forrest Tucker	Robert Redford
The Front Runner	Gary Hart	Hugh Jackman
Nidahase Piya DS	D. S. Senanayake	Lakshman Mendis (old); Thumindu Dodantenna (young)
Mary Queen of Scots	Mary, Queen of Scots	Saoirse Ronan
Mary Queen of Scots	Elizabeth I of England	Margot Robbie
Charlie Says	Leslie Van Houten	Hannah Murray
Charlie Says	Patricia Krenwinkel	Sosie Bacon
Charlie Says	Susan Atkins	Marianne Rendón
Charlie Says	Mary Brunner	Suki Waterhouse
Charlie Says	Charles Manson	Matt Smith
Patriot of the Web	Aaron Swartz	Shawn McClintock
Leto	Viktor Tsoi	Teo Yoo
Leto	Mike Naumenko	Roman Bilyk
Sobibor	Alexander Pechersky	Konstantin Khabensky
My Dinner with Hervé	Hervé Villechaize	Peter Dinklage
Skin	Bryon Widner	Jamie Bell (older); Tyler Williamson (young)
The Favourite	Anne, Queen of Great Britain	Olivia Colman
The Favourite	Abigail Masham, Baroness Masham	Emma Stone
The Favourite	Sarah Churchill, Duchess of Marlborough	Rachel Weisz
A Tale of Two Coreys	Corey Feldman	Elijah Marcano (teen); Scott Bosely (adult)
A Tale of Two Coreys	Corey Haim	Justin Ellings (teen); Casey Leach (adult)
The Bobby Brown Story	Bobby Brown	Woody McClain (older); Tyler Marcel Williams (young)
The Bobby Brown Story	Whitney Houston	Gabrielle Dennis
Vita & Virginia	Vita Sackville-West	Gemma Arterton
Vita & Virginia	Virginia Woolf	Elizabeth Debicki
Green Book	Tony Lip	Viggo Mortensen
Green Book	Don Shirley	Mahershala Ali
Bohemian Rhapsody	Freddie Mercury	Rami Malek
Bohemian Rhapsody	Brian May	Gwilym Lee
Bohemian Rhapsody	Roger Taylor	Ben Hardy
Bohemian Rhapsody	John Deacon	Joseph Mazzello
Unbroken: Path to Redemption	Louis Zamperini	Samuel Hunt
In Like Flynn	Errol Flynn	Thomas Cocquerel
Goyo: Ang Batang Heneral	Gregorio del Pilar	Paulo Avelino
White Boy Rick	Richard Wershe Jr.	Richie Merritt
BlacKkKlansman	Ron Stallworth	John David Washington
The Catcher Was a Spy	Moe Berg	Paul Rudd
Colette	Colette	Keira Knightley
On the Basis of Sex	Ruth Bader Ginsburg	Felicity Jones
Radium Girls	Radium Girls	Various actresses
The 15:17 to Paris	Spencer Stone	Spencer Stone
The 15:17 to Paris	Anthony Sadler	Anthony Sadler
The 15:17 to Paris	Alek Skarlatos	Alek Skarlatos
City of Lies	Russell Poole	Johnny Depp
City of Lies	Darius "Jack" Jackson	Forest Whitaker
The Happy Prince	Oscar Wilde	Rupert Everett
Vice	Dick Cheney	Christian Bale
The Mule	Earl Stone	Clint Eastwood
27 Guns	Yoweri Museveni	Arnold Mubangizi
Don't Worry, He Won't Get Far on Foot	John Callahan	Joaquin Phoenix
I Can Only Imagine	Bart Millard	J. Michael Finley (older); Brody Rose (young)
Stan & Ollie	Stan Laurel	Steve Coogan
Stan & Ollie	Oliver Hardy	John C. Reilly
At Eternity's Gate	Vincent van Gogh	Willem Dafoe
All Is True	William Shakespeare	Kenneth Branagh
All Is True	Anne Hathaway	Judi Dench
All Is True	Henry Wriothesley	Ian McKellen
Mahanati	Savitri	Keerthy Suresh

== 2019 ==
Film	Subject(s)	Portrayed by
Ginnen Upan Seethala	Rohana Wijeweera	Kamal Addaraarachchi
The Irishman	Frank Sheeran	Robert De Niro
The Irishman	Jimmy Hoffa	Al Pacino
The Irishman	Russell Bufalino	Joe Pesci
Ip Man 4: The Finale	Ip Man	Donnie Yen
Extremely Wicked, Shockingly Evil and Vile	Ted Bundy	Zac Efron
Extremely Wicked, Shockingly Evil and Vile	Liz Kloepfer	Lily Collins
The Laundromat	Jürgen Mossack	Gary Oldman
The Laundromat	Ramón Fonseca Mora	Antonio Banderas
The Traitor	Tommaso Buscetta	Pierfrancesco Favino
Fighting with My Family	Saraya Bevis	Florence Pugh
Ford v. Ferrari	Ken Miles	Christian Bale
Ford v. Ferrari	Carroll Shelby	Matt Damon
72 Hours: Martyr Who Never Died	Jaswant Singh Rawat	Avinash Dhyani
Wish Man	Frank Shankwitz	Andrew Steel (older); Chris Day (young)
Musashi	Miyamoto Musashi	Yoshihiko Hosoda
Hell on the Border	Bass Reeves	David Gyasi
The Accidental Prime Minister	Manmohan Singh	Anupam Kher
The Accidental Prime Minister	Sanjaya Baru	Akshaye Khanna
Proceder	Tomasz Chada	Piotr Witkowski
Fisherman's Friends	Members of Fisherman's Friends	Various Actors
The Golden Glove	Fritz Honka	Jonas Dassler
The Aeronauts	James Glaisher	Eddie Redmayne
The Highwaymen	Frank Hamer	Kevin Costner
The Highwaymen	Maney Gault	Woody Harrelson
The Best of Enemies	Ann Atwater	Taraji P. Henson
The Best of Enemies	C. P. Ellis	Sam Rockwell
Breakthrough	Joyce Smith	Chrissy Metz
Breakthrough	Brian Smith	Josh Lucas
Judy	Judy Garland	Renée Zellweger (older); Darci Shaw (young)
I Am Woman	Helen Reddy	Tilda Cobham-Hervey
Kesari	Havildar Ishar Singh	Akshay Kumar
The Dirt	Nikki Sixx	Douglas Booth
The Dirt	Mick Mars	Iwan Rheon
The Dirt	Tommy Lee	Colson Baker
The Dirt	Vince Neil	Daniel Webber
Walk Ride Rodeo	Amberley Snyder	Spencer Locke
The Bobby DeBarge Story	Bobby DeBarge	Roshon Fegan
The Kid	Billy the Kid	Dane DeHaan
Kingdom	Li Xin	Kento Yamazaki
Kingdom	Ying Zheng	Ryo Yoshizawa
Kingdom	He Liao Diao	Kanna Hashimoto
Manikarnika: The Queen of Jhansi	Rani of Jhansi	Kangana Ranaut
Son of Kashmir: Burhan	Burhan Wani	(voice)
Super 30	Anand Kumar	Hrithik Roshan
The Silent Natural	William "Dummy" Hoy	Miles Barbee
Midway	Dick Best	Ed Skrein
Midway	Edwin T. Layton	Patrick Wilson
Midway	C. Wade McClusky	Luke Evans
Midway	William "Bull" Halsey	Dennis Quaid
Midway	Chester W. Nimitz	Woody Harrelson
Midway	Jimmy Doolittle	Aaron Eckhart
Midway	Raymond A. Spruance	Jake Weber
Mr. Jones	Gareth Jones	James Norton
Richard Jewell	Richard Jewell	Paul Walter Hauser
A Girl from Mogadishu	Ifrah Ahmed	Aja Naomi King
Dolemite Is My Name	Rudy Ray Moore	Eddie Murphy
Official Secrets	Katharine Gun	Keira Knightley
Once Upon a Time in Hollywood	Sharon Tate	Margot Robbie
Susi Susanti: Love All	Susi Susanti	Laura Basuki
Sister Aimee	Aimee Semple McPherson	Anna Margaret Hollyman
Panipat	Sadashivrao Bhau	Arjun Kapoor
Panipat	Ahmad Shah Durrani	Sanjay Dutt
Panipat	Parvatibai	Kriti Sanon
Adults in the Room	Yanis Varoufakis	Christos Loulis
Thackeray	Bal Thackeray	Nawazuddin Siddiqui
Effigy: Poison and the City	Gesche Gottfried	Suzan Anbeh
Tolkien	J. R. R. Tolkien	Nicholas Hoult
Tolkien	Edith Tolkien	Lily Collins
Union of Salvation	Sergey Muravyov-Apostol	Leonid Bichevin
A Call to Spy	Virginia Hall	Sarah Megan Thomas
A Call to Spy	Vera Atkins	Stana Katic
A Call to Spy	Noor Inayat Khan	Radhika Apte
I Am Somebody's Child: The Regina Louise Story	Regina Louise	Angela Fairley (young); Sherri Saum (older)
I Am Somebody's Child: The Regina Louise Story	Jeanne Kerr	Ginnifer Goodwin
Just Mercy	Bryan Stevenson	Michael B. Jordan
Just Mercy	Walter McMillian	Jamie Foxx
The Report	Daniel J. Jones	Adam Driver
The Sholay Girl	Reshma Pathan	Bidita Bag (older); Spandan Chaturvedi (young)
The Boy Who Harnessed the Wind	William Kamkwamba	Maxwell Simba
Rocketman	Elton John	Taron Egerton
Patsy & Loretta	Patsy Cline	Megan Hilty
Patsy & Loretta	Loretta Lynn	Jessie Mueller
Goalie	Terry Sawchuk	Mark O'Brien
Curiosa	Marie de Régnier	Noémie Merlant
Curiosa	Pierre Louÿs	Niels Schneider
Fosse/Verdon	Bob Fosse	Sam Rockwell
Fosse/Verdon	Gwen Verdon	Michelle Williams
Fosse/Verdon	Ann Reinking	Margaret Qualley
Fosse/Verdon	Paddy Chayefsky	Norbert Leo Butz
N.T.R: Kathanayakudu	N. T. Rama Rao	Nandamuri Balakrishna
N.T.R: Mahanayakudu	N. T. Rama Rao	Nandamuri Balakrishna
Yatra	Y. S. Rajasekhara Reddy	Mammootty
Lakshmi's NTR	N. T. Rama Rao	P Vijay Kumar
Lakshmi's NTR	Lakshmi Parvathi	Yagna Shetty
Mallesham	Chintakindi Mallesham	Priyadarshi Pulikonda
Sye Raa Narasimha Reddy	Uyyalawada Narasimha Reddy	Chiranjeevi
Radioactive	Marie Curie	Rosamund Pike
Togo	Leonhard Seppala	Willem Dafoe
Togo	Togo	Diesel
George Reddy	George Reddy	Sandeep Madhav
Pocket Hercules: Naim Suleymanoglu	Naim Süleymanoğlu	Hayat Van Eck
The Two Popes	Cardinal Jorge Mario Bergoglio	Jonathan Pryce (older); Juan Minujín (young)
The Two Popes	Pope Benedict XVI	Anthony Hopkins
Bombshell	Megyn Kelly	Charlize Theron
Bombshell	Gretchen Carlson	Nicole Kidman
A Beautiful Day in the Neighborhood	Fred Rogers	Tom Hanks
A Beautiful Day in the Neighborhood	Lloyd Vogel	Matthew Rhys
The King	Henry V of England	Timothée Chalamet
The King	Louis, Duke of Guyenne	Robert Pattinson
The King	Henry IV of England	Ben Mendelsohn
Harriet	Harriet Tubman	Cynthia Erivo
Harriet	William Still	Leslie Odom Jr.
Mope	Stephen Clancy Hill	Nathan Stewart-Jarrett
Mope	Herbert Hin Wong	Kelly Sry
A Hidden Life	Franz Jägerstätter	August Diehl
Seberg	Jean Seberg	Kristen Stewart
Seberg	Hakim Jamal	Anthony Mackie
Dark Waters	Robert Bilott	Mark Ruffalo
True History of the Kelly Gang	Ned Kelly	George MacKay
True History of the Kelly Gang	Harry Power	Russell Crowe
Ride Like a Girl	Michelle Payne	Teresa Palmer
The Professor and the Madman	James Murray	Mel Gibson
The Professor and the Madman	William Chester Minor	Sean Penn

== See also ==
- Lists of biographical films
