= Alfred Munnings =

British artist

Sir Alfred Munnings KCVO PRA
- Alfred Munnings Reading Aloud Outside on the Grass, Harold Knight (c. 1911)
- Born: Alfred James Munnings; 8 October 1878; Mendham, Suffolk, England
- Died: 17 July 1959 (aged 80); Dedham, Essex, England
- Known for: Painting
- Movement: Newlyn School
- Spouse(s): Florence Carter-Wood (m. 1912; died 1914) Violet Haines McBride (m. 1920)

Sir Alfred James Munnings (8 October 1878 – 17 July 1959) is known as having been one of England's finest painters of horses, and as an outspoken critic of Modernism. Engaged by Lord Beaverbrook's Canadian War Memorials Fund after the Great War, he earned several prestigious commissions, which made him wealthy. Between 1912 and 1914 he was a member of the Newlyn School of artists. His work was part of the Olympic art competitions held in 1928, 1932, and 1948.

Munnings was president of the Royal Academy of Arts from 1944 until 1949, when he was succeeded by Sir Gerald Kelly.

== Biography ==
Alfred Munnings was born on 8 October 1878 at Mendham Mill, Mendham, Suffolk, across the River Waveney from Harleston in Norfolk. The second of the four sons of the miller John Munnings (1839–1914), who was the tenth child of a successful farmer, and his wife, Emily, née Ringer (1850–1945), one of nine children of a local farmer. Alfred grew up surrounded by the activity of a busy working mill with horses and horse-drawn carts arriving daily. After leaving Framlingham College at the age of fourteen he was apprenticed to local Norwich printer, Page Brothers, designing and drawing advertising posters for the next six years, attending the Norwich School of Art in his spare time. When his apprenticeship ended, he became a full-time painter. The loss of sight in his right eye in an accident in 1898 did not deflect his determination to paint, and in 1899 two of his pictures were shown at the Royal Academy Summer Exhibition. He painted rural scenes, frequently of subjects such as Gypsies and horses. He was associated with the Newlyn School of painters, and while there met Florence Carter-Wood (1888–1914), a young horsewoman and painter. They married on 19 January 1912 but she tried to kill herself on their honeymoon and did so in 1914. Munnings bought Castle House, Dedham, in 1919, describing it as 'the house of my dreams'. He used the house and adjoining studio extensively throughout the rest of his career, and it was opened as the Munnings Art Museum in the early 1960s, after Munnings's death. Munnings remarried in 1920; his second wife was another horsewoman, Violet McBride (née Haines). There were no children from either marriage. Although his second wife encouraged him to accept commissions from society figures, Munnings became best known for his equine painting: he often depicted horses participating in hunting and racing.

== War artists ==
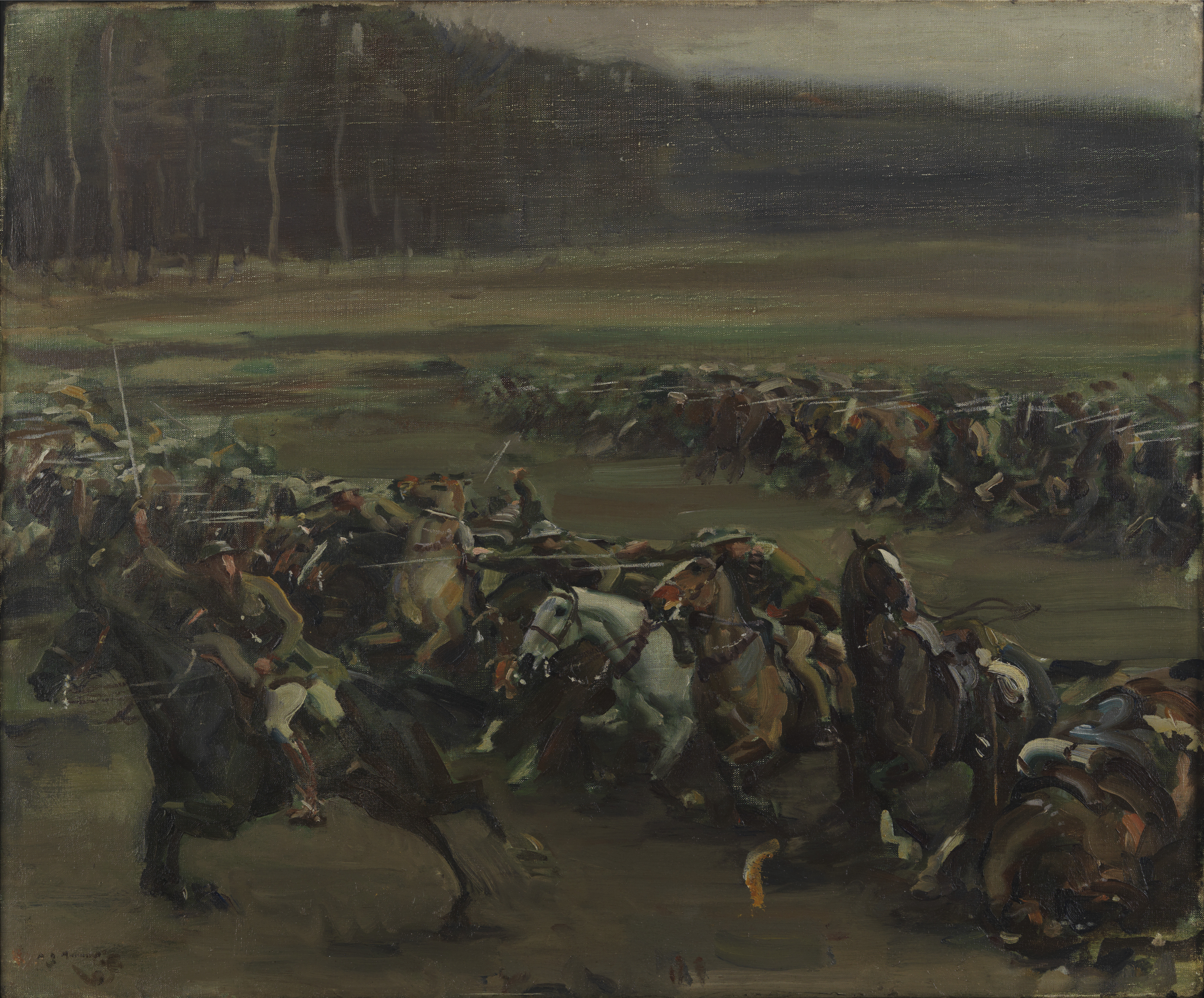
Charge of Flowerdew's Squadron (1918), Canadian War Museum

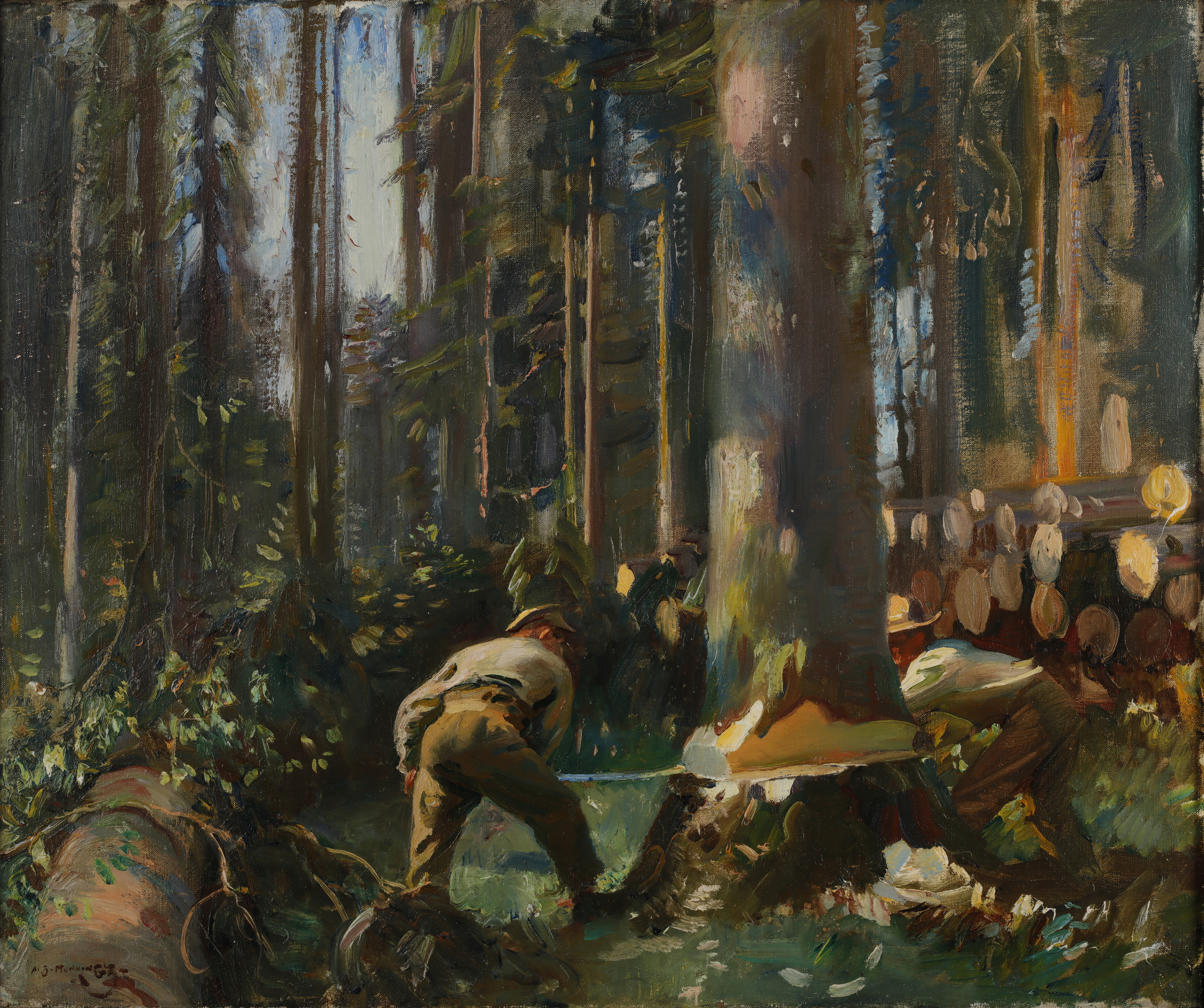
Felling a Tree in the Vosges (1918), Canadian War Museum

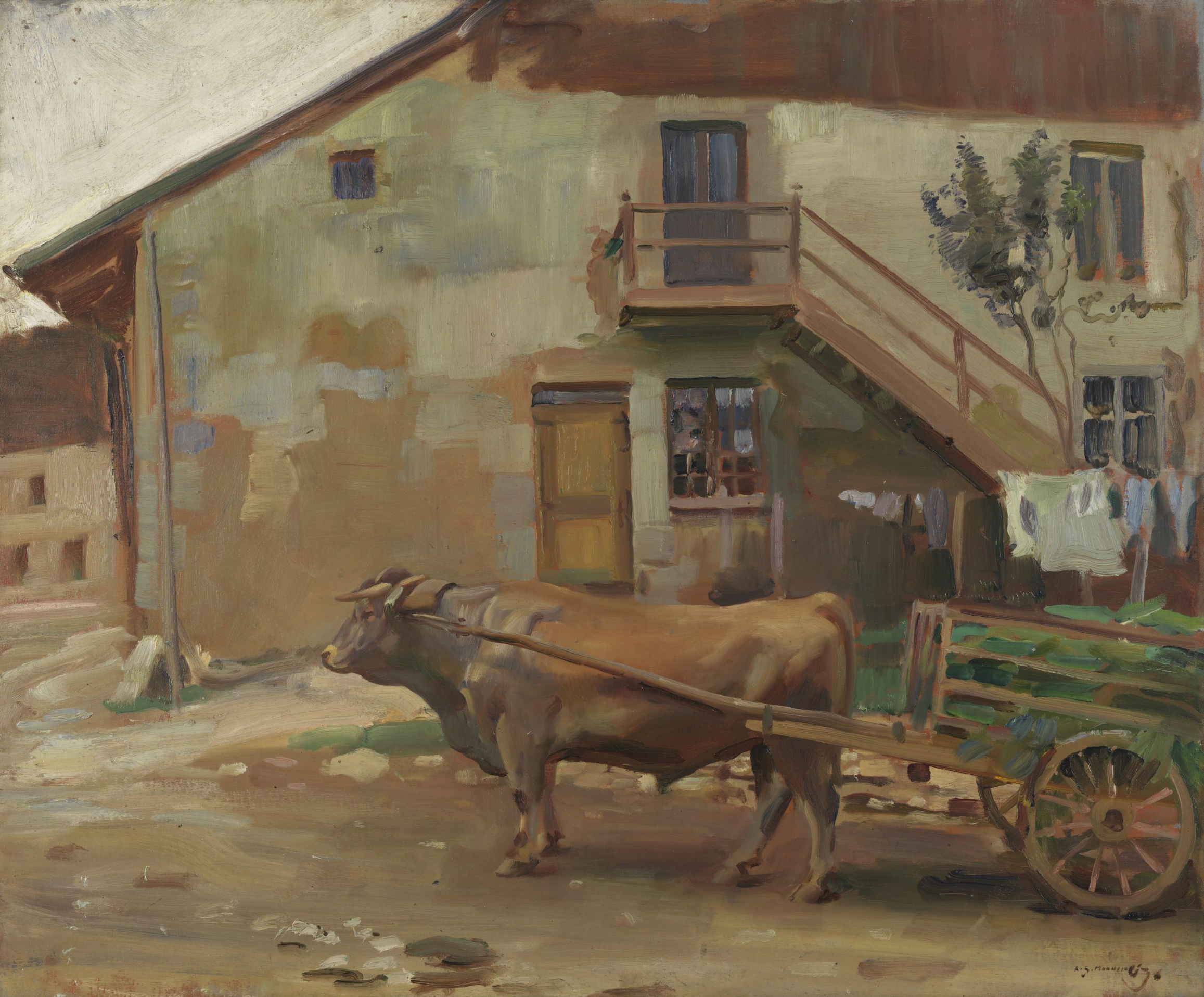
Study of a Swiss Bull (before 1919), Canadian War Museum

Although he volunteered to join the Army, he was assessed as unfit to fight. In 1917, his participation in the war was limited to a civilian job outside Reading, processing tens of thousands of Canadian horses en route to France — and often to death. Later, he was assigned to one of the horse remount depots on the Western Front. Munnings's talent was employed as a war artist to the Canadian Cavalry Brigade, under the patronage of Max Aitken, in the latter part of the war. During the war he painted many scenes, including in 1918 a portrait of General Jack Seely mounted on his horse Warrior (now in the collection of the National Gallery of Canada, Ottawa). Munnings worked on this canvas a few thousand yards from the German front lines. When General Seely's unit was forced into a hasty withdrawal, the artist discovered what it was like to come under shellfire.

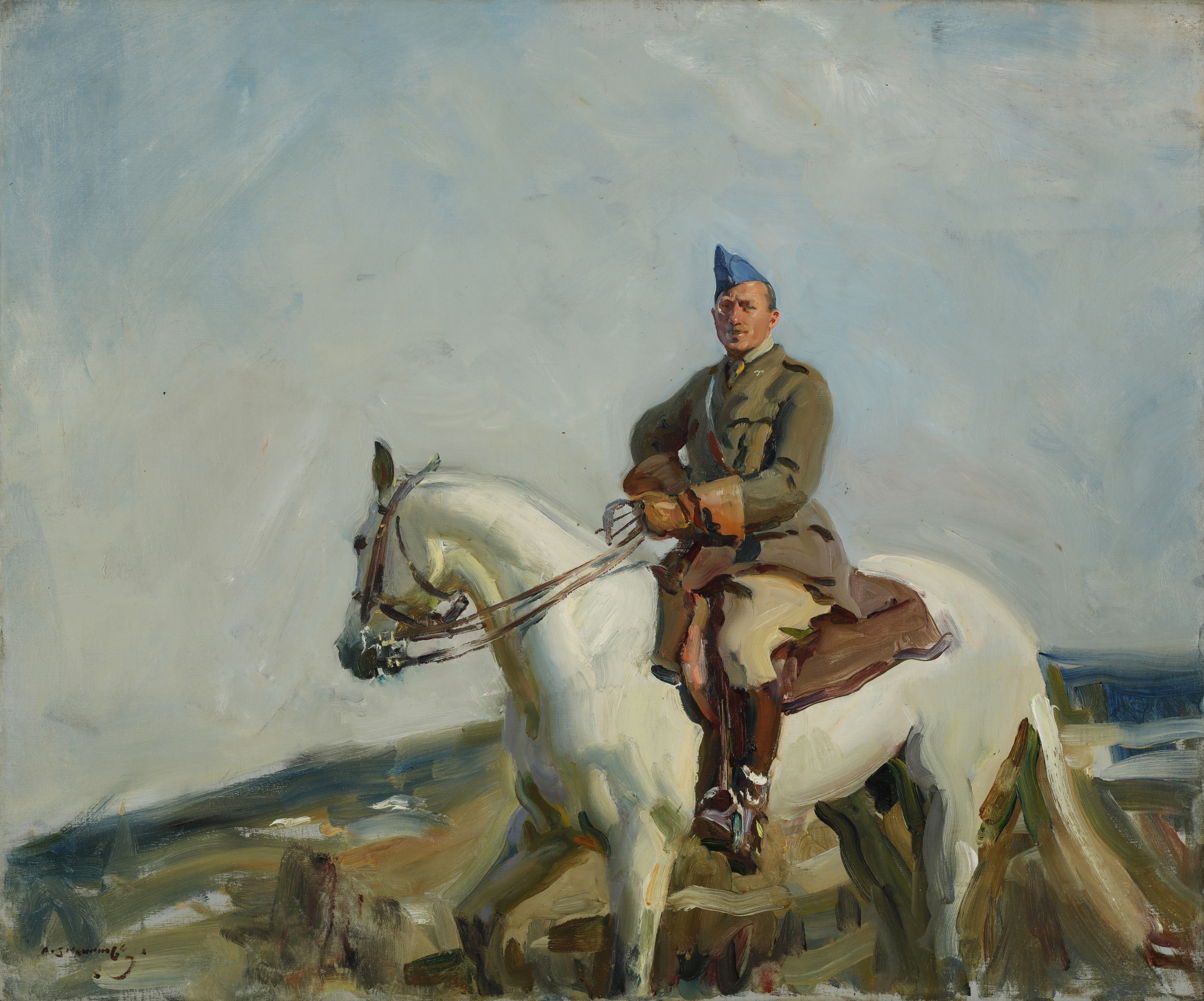
Le Comte d'Etchegoyen features Olivier d'Etchegoyen, the headquarters staff interpreter for the Canadian Cavalry Brigade (before 1919), Canadian War Museum

In 1918 Munnings also painted Charge of Flowerdew's Squadron. After what is known as "the last great cavalry charge" at the Battle of Moreuil Wood, Gordon Flowerdew was posthumously awarded the Victoria Cross for leading Lord Strathcona's Horse in a successful engagement with entrenched German forces.

The Canadian Forestry Corps invited Munnings to tour its work camps in France, and in 1918 he produced drawings, watercolors, and oil paintings, including Draft Horses, Lumber Mill in the Forest of Dreux. This role of horses in the war was critical and under-reported; and in fact, horse fodder was the single largest commodity shipped to the front by some countries.

The Canadian War Records Exhibition at the Royal Academy after the Armistice of November 1918 included forty-five of Munnings's canvasses.

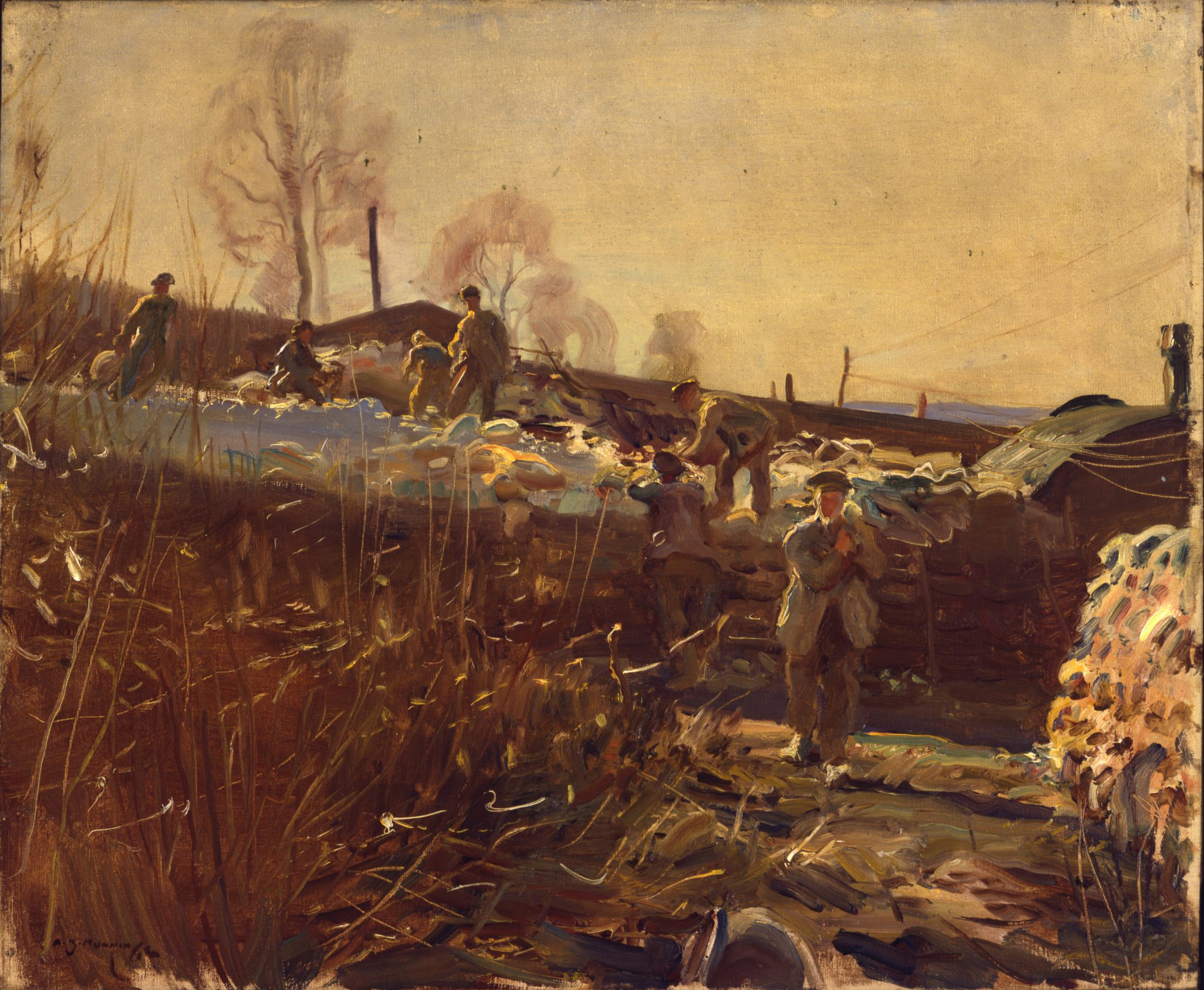
Shelters in Smallfoot Wood (before 1919), Canadian War Museum

After the war, Munnings began to establish himself as a sculptor, although he had no formal training in the discipline. His first public work was the equestrian statue of Edward Horner in Mells, Somerset, a collaboration with his friend Sir Edwin Lutyens, who designed a plinth for the statue. This work led to a commission from the Jockey Club for a sculpture of Brown Jack.

=== Later career ===
Munnings was elected president of the Royal Academy of Arts in 1944. He was made a Knight Bachelor in July of the same year, and was appointed a Knight Commander of the Royal Victorian Order in the 1947 New Year Honours. His presidency is best known for the valedictory speech he gave in 1949, in which he attacked modernism. The broadcast was heard by millions of listeners to BBC radio. An evidently inebriated Munnings claimed that the work of Cézanne, Matisse, and Picasso had corrupted art. He recalled that Winston Churchill had once said to him, "Alfred, if you met Picasso coming down the street would you join with me in kicking his ... something something?" to which Munnings said he replied, "Yes Sir, I would".

In 1950, Munnings, through a ruse, got hold of some of Stanley Spencer's Scrapbook Drawings and initiated an unsuccessful police prosecution against him for obscenity. Sir Gerald Kelly, Munnings' successor as president of the Royal Academy, intervened with the police on Spencer's behalf.

Munnings died at Castle House, Dedham, Essex, on 17 July 1959. His ashes were interred at St Paul's Cathedral, with an epitaph by John Masefield ('O friend, how very lovely are the things, The English things, you helped us to perceive'). After his death, his widow turned their house in Dedham into a museum of his work. The village pub in Mendham is named after him, as is a street there.

Munnings was portrayed by Dominic Cooper in the film Summer in February, which was released in Britain in 2013. The film is adapted from a novel by Jonathan Smith.

== At auction ==
His sporting art works have enjoyed popularity in the United Kingdom, the United States and elsewhere. As of 2007, the highest price paid for a Munnings painting was $7,848,000 for The Red Prince Mare, far above his previous auction record of $4,292,500 set at Christie's in December 1999. It was one of four works by Munnings in the auction. The Red Prince Mare is a 40 by 60 inches (100 by 150 cm) oil on canvas that was executed in 1921 and had an estimate of $4,000,000 to $6,000,000.

== Writings ==
Castle House in Dedham. Munnings' home from 1919 is a dedicated museum to his career

Munnings wrote an autobiography in three volumes:

- An Artist's Life, London: Museum Press, 1950
- The Second Burst, London: Museum Press, 1951
- The Finish, London: Museum Press, 1952

== Notes ==
Cultural offices
Preceded by Sir Edwin Lutyens	President of the Royal Academy; 1944–1949	Succeeded by Sir Gerald Kelly
