= Florence Carter-Wood =

English painter (1888–1914)

- Born: Edith Florence Carter-Wood; 4 September 1888
- Died: 24 July 1914 (aged 25); Lamorna, Cornwall
- Known for: Painting
- Movement: Newlyn School

Florence Carter-Wood (4 September 1888 – 24 July 1914) was a British painter.

She studied at the Forbes School of Painting, founded by Stanhope Forbes and his wife Elizabeth, with her brother Joey Carter-Wood. She went to Cornwall to continue her studies, and while there she mixed with the Lamorna community. She also modelled for portraits by other members of the community, including Harold Knight.

Carter-Wood married the painter Alfred Munnings on 19 January 1912. She first attempted suicide while they were on their honeymoon, and Munnings later stated that the marriage had never been consummated. Carter-Wood subsequently developed a close relationship with Munnings' friend, Captain Gilbert Evans, a Welsh army officer and local land agent. Munnings, meanwhile, was close to Harold Knight's wife Laura, herself an artist. Evans, though not an artist, had become closely involved with the Lamorna community and referred to Carter-Wood in his diary by the nickname "Blote".

In July 1914, after Evans had left for colonial service in Nigeria, Carter-Wood killed herself by taking cyanide.

== Legacy ==
Her death was the subject of a scandal and Munnings is said never to have spoken of her again. She is buried at Sancreed churchyard, with a headstone that reads “Edith Florence - "Blote" – Wife of A. J. Munnings - Sep. 4 1888 – July 24, 1914”. Her brother Joey was killed in action in 1915 during the First World War.

Alfred Munnings' paintings of his wife, including "Portrait of Florence Munnings at Sunset", painted in the year of their marriage, have been exhibited at the Penlee House Gallery in Cornwall.

== In popular culture ==
Carter-Wood is played by Emily Browning in the 2013 film Summer in February, which is based on the novel of the same name by Jonathan Smith.
