= Summer in February =

- Theatrical release poster
- Directed by: Christopher Menaul
- Screenplay by: Jonathan Smith
- Based on: Summer in February by Jonathan Smith
- Produced by: Jeremy Cowdrey; Pippa Cross; Janette Day
- Starring: Dominic Cooper; Emily Browning; Dan Stevens; Hattie Morahan
- Cinematography: Andrew Dunn
- Edited by: Chris Gill; St. John O'Rorke
- Music by: Benjamin Wallfisch
- Production companies: CrossDay Productions Ltd.; Apart Films; Marwood Pictures
- Distributed by: Metrodome Distribution
- Release date: 14 June 2013
- Running time: 100 minutes
- Country: United Kingdom
- Language: English
- Box office: $1,624 + $70,966 (Home Market Performance) $72,590 (total)

Summer in February is a 2013 British romantic drama film directed by Christopher Menaul. Novelist Jonathan Smith adapted the screenplay from his 1995 eponymous novel. The film stars Dominic Cooper, Emily Browning, Dan Stevens, Hattie Morahan and Nicholas Farrell and focuses on the true story of the love triangle between British artist Alfred Munnings, his friend Gilbert Evans and Florence Carter-Wood in early 20th-century Cornwall. It was released in the United Kingdom on 14 June 2013.

== Plot ==
In Cornwall in 1913, Bohemian artists Alfred Munnings, known as AJ, Laura Knight and Harold Knight make up the Lamorna Group. Charismatic and caddish AJ is close friends with the gentlemanly and shy land agent Gilbert Evans, an army officer who formerly served in the Boer War and socialises with the various Lamorna artists.

Late one night, Florence Carter-Wood arrives in the village, hoping to study painting with the Lamorna artists. She also looks to join her brother, Joey, while also escaping the iron grip of her father. Gilbert is captivated by her straight away.

Florence wishes to study sketching with AJ, and models on horseback for one of his paintings ('The Morning Ride'). She also forms a bond with Gilbert, who records all of their meetings in his diary. Gilbert decides to propose, but he is interrupted by AJ. A few days later, AJ himself proposes to Florence, who accepts excitedly.

As the wedding approaches, AJ begins to be cruel towards Florence. AJ invites Florence and Gilbert to an exhibition at the Royal Academy, where his portrait of Florence is displayed alongside two others: a gypsy woman, and of Dolly, a local woman who models frequently for the Lamorna group. Florence is embarrassed to see her painting so prominently displayed next to portraits of other women, and she confides in Gilbert that she begins to regret accepting AJ. At the wedding ceremony, she asks AJ to remove her portrait, but he refuses, even gloating in his wedding speech that the portrait will remain in the Royal Academy.

Despairing, Florence leaves the reception and attempts suicide by cyanide poison, although she survives. Once she and AJ return to Cornwall, she asks Gilbert to look for a private studio space for her. Gilbert finds an abandoned cottage, and Florence returns home to pack up her belongings to move in. She is ambushed by AJ, who attempts to force himself upon her. Florence escapes, and runs back to the cottage, where she is comforted by Gilbert.

A few days later, Gilbert announces to AJ and Florence that he has applied for a job in Africa, and will be leaving Cornwall. In the ensuing argument, Florence storms out of the cafe; Gilbert follows her down to the cottage. Florence and Gilbert kiss, and then sleep together. They continue to meet in secret (although AJ is aware of the affair) until Gilbert leaves for Africa.

Florence realises that she is pregnant, and explains to Laura that the baby cannot be AJ's (in reality, Munnings claimed that the marriage was never consummated). At a party hosted by the Knights, AJ, overhears a conversation between Florence and Laura and realises the truth. Distraught, Florence runs away to the cottage alone, and drinks the rest of the cyanide poison.

Two years later, Gilbert returns to Cornwall, leaving flowers at Florence's grave. He goes to speak to Harold, who gives him a package with a note addressed to him from AJ. Gilbert walks down to the cottage, opening the parcel - AJ's portrait of Florence on horseback - and hangs it above the fireplace.

The film ends by stating that AJ never returned to Lamorna, but became one of the most celebrated artists of his generation and President of the Royal Academy; Laura and Harold Knight were both elected to the Royal Academy; Florence's brother, Joey, was killed in France in 1915; and Gilbert Evans stayed in Lamorna; the painting of Florence hung in his house for the rest of his life.

== Cast ==
- Dominic Cooper as AJ Munnings
- Dan Stevens as Gilbert Evans
- Emily Browning as Florence Carter-Wood
- Hattie Morahan as Laura Knight
- Shaun Dingwall as Harold Knight
- Mia Austen as Dolly
- Max Deacon as Joey Carter-Wood
- Nicholas Farrell as Mr Carter-Wood

== Production ==
=== Filming ===
Summer in February was shot during January and February 2012. The cast and crew spent four weeks filming in Cornwall from 15 January. Shooting locations included Penzance, Lamorna and Prussia Cove. National Trust beaches Holywell and Porthcurno provided "a dramatic setting" for a horse-race sequence and a beach party scene respectively. Producer Jeremy Cowdrey explained "We could have filmed it anywhere in the world but we were determined to do it here, where it all happened. It's a true story and, because it's about a Bohemian artists' colony, the exciting thing is to recreate it, splash Cornwall and bring the county alive."

=== Music ===
In September 2012, Rick Schultz from The Jewish Journal revealed that English composer and conductor Benjamin Wallfisch would be composing the musical score of the film. Wallfisch had not read the novel prior to being asked to score the film. Speaking to Classic FM's Sam Pittis, Wallfisch said that it was clear to him from the start that the score had to be something emotional and thematic. He also wanted to capture the beauty of the location where the film is set and tell stories through the music.

The score is played by the London Chamber Orchestra and features piano solos by Yuja Wang. Wallfisch thought Wang would be perfect to play on the score and he approached her with some of the pieces he had composed. Wang agreed to come aboard and during the recording sessions, Wallfisch was so impressed with her playing that he wrote her a solo piano suite of all the main themes. The score to Summer in February was released by Decca Records in the UK on 24 June 2013.

The track listing for the album is as follows:

No.	Title	Length
1.	"Lamorna"	3:06
2.	"Mirror"	2:18
3.	"The Races"	1:34
4.	"Painting"	4:51
5.	"Proposal"	1:30
6.	"Gilbert's Theme"	1:27
7.	"Florence's Theme"	2:36
8.	"AJ's Request"	1:06
9.	"Unaccountable"	2:14
10.	"Wedding"	1:19
11.	"Cyanide"	3:20
12.	"Florence's Hut"	1:56
13.	"Art And Life"	2:18
14.	"Final Kiss"	4:59
15.	"The Storm"	3:15
16.	"Aftermath"	1:56
17.	"Gilbert Returns"	3:49
18.	"Siren's Lullaby"	2:50
19.	"Epilogue: Morning Ride"	4:03

== Reception ==
=== Box office ===
Summer in February entered the box office chart at number 11 after grossing £74,898 in its opening weekend for a per-cinema average of £1,170 in 64 cinemas.

=== Critical response ===
Summer in February has received mostly negative reviews from critics. Film review aggregator site Rotten Tomatoes classified the film as "rotten" with a 31% approval rating among 38 reviews, with a weighted average of 4.6/10. The site's consensus reads, "It boasts beautiful scenery, but in every other respect, Summer in February is a painfully bland period drama." On Metacritic the film has a score of 22%, based on 6 critics, indicating "generally unfavorable reviews". Stella Papamichael from Digital Spy gave the film three out of five stars and commented "The film itself is no masterwork, but it has a certain irresistible undertow." Papamichael thought that Menaul and Smith seemed unsure when it came to the scenes in between documented incidents and called the dialogue "serviceable". Anna Smith, writing for Empire, also awarded the film three stars and she stated "While the melodrama occasionally grates, this works as a raw romance and an intriguing glimpse of a bold and brash artist ahead of his time." Total Film's Tom Dawson gave Summer in February a mixed review, saying "Though it struggles to transcend its Sunday-TV feel, Christopher Menaul's film boasts sturdy turns from its three leads, while the outdoor lensing is a breath of fresh air."

Michael Hann from The Guardian writes "Proof that truth is duller than fiction comes with this tale of real events in the Lamorna artists' colony in Cornwall in the months before the first world war." He also thought Browning's role was underwritten. During her review, Tara Brady from The Irish Times, thought the film was like "Downton Abbey stripped of charm and lobotomised." The Independent's Anthony Quinn felt that the film "struggles to rise above the blandness of a Sunday teatime serial", where "sudden bursts of drama fizzle like damp fireworks". Derek Malcolm from the London Evening Standard lamented that the film "seems to be much ado about nothing very much, despite the pleasing performances and scenery," jibing that his father's "painted horse, if only he could speak, could probably tell [him] more about Munnings the artist than Summer in February does."
