= Christopher Menaul =

British director and screenwriter

- Occupations: Film director, television director, television writer
- Years active: 1977–present

Christopher Menaul is a British film, television director and television writer. Since the late 1970s, Menaul has amassed credits in episodic television and by directing television films.

== Filmography ==
=== Film ===
- Feast of July (1995)
- First Night (2010)
- Summer in February (2013)
- Another Mother's Son (2017)

=== TV ===
- 2015 Killing Jesus (TV film)
- 2013 The Suspicions of Mr Whicher II
- 2011 Combat Hospital (TV series)
- 2011 Zen (TV mini-series)
- 2009 Above Suspicion (TV film)
- 2007 Saddam's Tribe (TV film)
- 2006 See No Evil: The Moors Murders (TV film)
- 2005 Secret Smile (TV film)
- 2005 Planespotting (TV film)
- 2004 Belonging (TV film)
- 2004 Wall of Silence (TV film)
- 2003 State of Mind (TV film)
- 2002 The Forsyte Saga (TV mini-series)
- 2000 One Kill (TV film)
- 1999 The Passion of Ayn Rand (TV film)
- 1997 Bright Hair (TV film)
- 1994 Fatherland (TV film)
- 1994 Homicide: Life on the Street (TV series)
- 1992 Great Performances (TV series)
- 1991 Prime Suspect (TV miniseries)
- 1989 Nice Work (TV series)
- 1989 Precious Bane (TV film)
- 1989 Tales of Sherwood Forest (TV series)
- 1988 Worlds Beyond (TV series)
- 1987 Casualty (TV series)
- 1987 Tandoori Nights (TV series)
- 1980-1986 Minder (TV series)
- 1984 Punters (TV film)
- 1976-1984 Play for Today (TV series, also a writer)
- 1984 Treatment (TV film)
- 1983 The Case of the Frightened Lady (TV film)
- 1983 Tucker's Luck (TV series)
- 1981 BBC2 Playhouse (TV series)
- 1976-1978 The Sweeney (TV series)
- 1977-1978 Target (TV series, also a writer)
