= Effigy: Poison and the City =

- German: Effigie – Das Gift und die Stadt
- Directed by: Udo Flohr
- Written by: Peer Meter; Udo Flohr; Antonia Roeller
- Produced by: Patricia Ryan; Udo Flohr
- Starring: Suzan Anbeh; Elisa Thiemann; Christoph Gottschalch; Roland Jankowsky; Uwe Bohm
- Cinematography: Thomas Kist
- Edited by: Sven Pape
- Music by: Nic Raine with the City of Prague Philharmonic Orchestra
- Production company: GeekFrog Media
- Distributed by: Nova Vento Entertainment (USA: theatrical)
- Release dates: 21 September 2019 (Filmfest Bremen); 9 October 2020 (USA)
- Running time: 85 minutes
- Countries: Germany; USA
- Languages: German; English

Effigy: Poison and the City (German: Effigie – Das Gift und die Stadt) is a 2019 historical thriller film about German 19th century female serial killer Gesche Gottfried, directed, co-written and co-produced by Udo Flohr, marking his directorial debut. The film is based on original trial records, and was inspired by main screenwriter Peer Meter's stage play "The Interrogation of Gesche Gottfried".

The film had its world premiere at Filmfest Bremen on 21 September 2019.

== Plot ==
1828 in the German port city of Bremen: Young Cato Böhmer arrives to take up her new position as a city clerk, assisting investigating judge Senator Droste at the criminal court. She strives to become an attorney – at a time when women aren't even admitted to universities. As the duo investigates an alleged poison attack reported by master miller Steitz, they encounter Gesche Gottfried, a suave and attractive widow known for her philanthropic attitude. Gottfried also appears to be in danger. However she soon turns out to be a prime suspect in a series of killings, the victims of which include her parents, her three husbands, her children and her twin brother, as well as friends and neighbors. While searching for evidence, Droste comes under increasing pressure from Bremen's bourgeoisie, especially Captain Ehlers who demands the senator's support for his steam shipping company. But Droste, like Mayor Johann Smidt, sees the future in the emerging railroad technology. Cato Böhmer is just barely able to fend off a political intrigue of the captain against her boss. Albeit with forensic proof of arsenic poisoning remaining elusive, she and the senator desperately need to obtain a confession from Gesche Gottfried.

== Cast ==
- Suzan Anbeh as Gesche Gottfried
- Elisa Thiemann as Cato Böhmer
- Christoph Gottschalch as Senator Droste
- Roland Jankowsky as Captain Ehlers
- Uwe Bohm as Kommissar Tonjes
- Marc Ottiker as Dr. Hoffschläger
- Eugen Krößner as Dr. Luce
- Ulrich Sachsse as Mayor Johann Smidt
- Christian Intorp as Müllermeister Steitz

== Reception ==
On the review aggregator website Rotten Tomatoes Effigy: Poison and the City holds a "90% fresh" rating, based on 21 reviews, representing a positive response from critics. The site's critical consensus reads, "Deftly filmed by director Udo Flohr, Effigy: Poison and the City offers an absorbing glimpse of history that should satisfy period drama fans."
