= Suzan Anbeh =

German actress

- Born: 18 March 1970 (age 55); Oberhausen, West Germany (now Germany)
- Other names: Susan Anbeh
- Occupations: Model, Actress
- Known for: French Kiss
- Notable work: Effigy – Poison and the City

Suzan or Susan Anbeh (born 18 March 1970) is a German actress best known to English-speaking audiences as the woman who stole Timothy Hutton away from Meg Ryan in the 1995 film French Kiss.

Anbeh was in a relationship with Austrian actor Bernhard Schir. They have a son born in 2000.

She appeared again in the lead role of My Ex-Boyfriend's Wedding (2006), a romantic comedy.

Anbeh has also been selling perfumes under the label Berlin de Vous.

== Selected filmography ==
- French Kiss (1995), as Juliette
- Der Kranichmann (2002, TV film), as Karla Fischer
- Agnes and His Brothers (2004), as Desiree
- This Far from Paradise (2005, TV film), as Rebecca McHenry
- Ein Geschenk des Himmels (2005, TV film), as Susanna Samel
- Heiraten macht mich nervös (2005, TV film), as Nina Becker
- Mr. Average (2006), as Zoé
- My Ex-Boyfriend's Wedding (2006, TV film), as Paula Andersen
- Ich liebe den Mann meiner besten Freundin (2008, TV film), as Karen Burkhardt
- The Door (2009), as Susanne Wiegand
- The Theatre Bizarre (2011), as Mo
- Der Mann auf dem Baum (2011, TV film), as Linda
- Der Weihnachtskrieg (2013, TV film), as Yvonne Achenbach
- Maya (2018), as Sigrid
- Effigy: Poison and the City (2019), as Gesche Gottfried
