= Shangri-La Suite =

2016 crime drama film directed by Eddie O'Keefe

- Film poster
- Directed by: Eddie O'Keefe
- Written by: Chris Hutton; Eddie O'Keefe
- Produced by: Tariq Merhab; Matthew Perniciaro; Michael Sherman
- Starring: Emily Browning; Luke Grimes; Ron Livingston
- Cinematography: Delaney Teichler
- Edited by: Franklin Peterson
- Music by: Mondo Boys
- Distributed by: Gravitas Ventures
- Release date: October 28, 2016
- Running time: 84 minutes
- Country: United States
- Language: English

Shangri-La Suite (also known as Kill The King) is a 2016 American crime drama film directed by Eddie O'Keefe and starring Emily Browning, Luke Grimes and Ron Livingston. It is O'Keefe's directorial debut.

== Plot ==
The movie begins with an introduction to both Karen and Jack's lives before they are committed to a mental rehabilitation facility in 1974. The audience learns that Karen grew up in a white middle-class family, while Jack's mother died during childbirth, leaving him alone with his abusive father. It is during his childhood that his obsession with Elvis Presley begins.

At the rehab facility, Karen and Jack meet and fall in love with one another. As their love story progresses, Jack finds out that Elvis is not as wholesome as he thought he was, and he informs Karen that it is his life's destiny to kill Elvis. The trigger for their killing spree is when their doctor touches Karen inappropriately and upon hearing this news, Jack shoots the doctor and the security guards, allowing the couple to escape.

They then go to Jack's home, where they find his friend Teijo, who hid guns and money for Jack before he was sent to the rehab facility, but the money has turned up missing. Teijo joins the crew and they go to Jack's father's house to try to get money from him, but they shoot him when he refuses. The crew now heads to an acquaintance of Jack's trailer to learn of Elvis's location and how to access his hotel. After getting the information they came for, they head to Los Angeles to finish their mission.

Stopping along the way, Karen informs Teijo that she has missed her period and might be pregnant. Later that night, Karen tells Jack she is having second thoughts about killing Elvis. As they are fighting, they are attacked by law enforcement, and Teijo is shot and killed. Following his death, Karen and Jack continue to Los Angeles and check-into the Shangri-La Suite at a beachside hotel. Karen then tells Jack that she might be pregnant and he agrees to include the baby in his destiny.

The next morning, Jack leaves alone to finish his destiny of killing Elvis. Karen goes by herself to complete her dream of swimming in the Pacific Ocean, where she unknowingly meets Elvis's wife and daughter. She then steals the hotel attendant's car and leaves the city. The last time she is seen, she gets her period at a gas station and no one has seen her since. Jack makes it to Elvis's suite, but loses the nerve to kill him and is killed by Elvis himself. This gives Elvis the nerve he needs to become his former self and goes on to begin his 1974 tour.

== Cast ==
- Emily Browning as Karen Bird
  - Jade Pettyjohn as Young Karen Bird
- Luke Grimes as Jack Blueblood
- Ron Livingston as Elvis Presley
  - Reiley McClendon as 1950's Elvis
- Alan Tudyk as Dr. Sanborne
- Burt Reynolds as The Narrator
- John Carroll Lynch as Colonel Tom Parker
- Avan Jogia as Teijo Littlefoot
- Ashley Greene as Priscilla Presley
- Echo Kellum as Hepcat
- Alyvia Alyn Lind as Lisa Marie Presley
- Trevante Rhodes as Security Guard #2
- Tatanka Means as Officer Gingrass
- Paul Rae as Randyll
- Amanda Aday as Gladys Presley (Elvis' mother)
- Bunny Gibson as Motel Clerk
- Rob Zabrecky as Toby
- Lew Temple as Mr. X
