= Emily Browning =

Australian actress (born 1988)

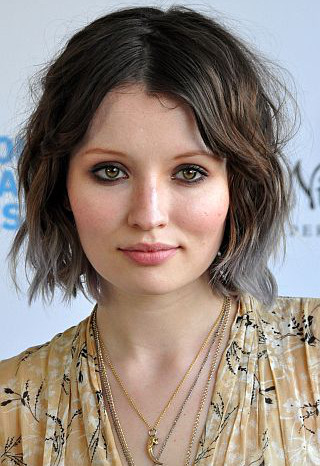
- Browning in 2011
- Born: Emily Jane Browning; 7 December 1988 (age 37); Melbourne, Victoria, Australia
- Occupations: Actress; singer
- Years active: 1998–present
- Spouse: Eddie O'Keefe (m. 2023)

Emily Jane Browning (born December 7, 1988) is an Australian actress. She made her film debut in the television film The Echo of Thunder (1998), and subsequently appeared in television shows such as High Flyers (1999), Something in the Air (2000–2001), and Blue Heelers (2000–2002). Her breakthrough role was in the 2002 horror film Ghost Ship, which introduced her to a wider audience. In 2005, Browning won the Australian Film Institute International Award for Best Actress for her portrayal of Violet Baudelaire in the film Lemony Snicket's A Series of Unfortunate Events (2004).

Browning is also known for her roles in The Uninvited (2009), Sucker Punch (2011), Sleeping Beauty (2011), and Pompeii (2014). She was named the Breakthrough Performer of The Year by the Hamptons International Film Festival for her role in the latter. Browning's other films include Summer in February, Plush (both 2013), Legend (2015) and Golden Exits (2017). From 2017 to 2021, she starred as Laura Moon in the Starz series American Gods. She also had a recurring role in Showtime's drama series The Affair (2018–2019). In 2023, she starred as Zoe in Amazon Prime Video's series Class of '07.

== Early life and education ==
Emily Jane Browning was born in Melbourne, Victoria, the daughter of Andrew and Shelley Browning. She has two younger brothers.

She attended Hurstbridge Learning Co-op and Eltham High School.

== Career ==
=== 1998–2008 ===
Browning's debut acting role was in the 1998 Hallmark Channel movie The Echo of Thunder. Additional roles in Australian film and television productions soon followed, including recurring roles in the television series Blue Heelers from 2000 to 2002, and Something in the Air from 2000 to 2001. In 2001, Browning appeared as the daughter of the character played by Billy Connolly in The Man Who Sued God.

She made her American film debut in 2002's Ghost Ship, and won an Australian Film Institute Award for Best Young Actress, the same year. In 2003, she appeared opposite Heath Ledger and Orlando Bloom in 2003's Ned Kelly, and reunited with Connolly the following year in the film adaptation of Lemony Snicket's A Series of Unfortunate Events, in which she played Violet Baudelaire.

In 2006, Browning appeared in the music video for Evermore's "Light Surrounding You". In the behind-the-scenes video for the clip, the band stated, "[We] suck as actors, so we decided to get Emily". She attended the L'Oreal Fashion Festival as a festival ambassador on 1 February 2007.

=== 2008–2011 ===
Browning played the lead role in the 2009 horror film The Uninvited, an American remake of the 2003 South Korean film A Tale of Two Sisters. She turned down a request to audition for the role of Bella Swan in Twilight, citing exhaustion, despite an endorsement from series author Stephenie Meyer. In 2009, she was cast as Babydoll in Zack Snyder's action film Sucker Punch, as a replacement for Amanda Seyfried, who dropped out due to scheduling conflicts. Filming took place in Vancouver from September 2009 to January 2010, and the film was released on 25 March 2011. In an interview at Comic-Con, she confirmed that she would be singing in the film, while claiming that her audition tape brought tears to her casting agent's eyes and the song she selected ("Killing Me Softly") was one of Zack Snyder's wife Deborah's favourites, which Browning referred to as the "selling point" on her being cast in the role.

In February 2010, it was announced that Browning would play the lead role in the independent Australian film Sleeping Beauty, directed by Julia Leigh. She replaced Mia Wasikowska, who was committed to a film adaptation of Jane Eyre at the time. The film screened at the 2011 Cannes Film Festival and the Sydney Film Festival. In a review from the festival, Peter Bradshaw of The Guardian called the film "Technically elegant with vehemence and control ... Emily Browning gives a fierce and powerful performance ... There is force and originality in Leigh's work". Fionnuala Halligan in Screen International wrote "Browning has gone the distance for her director and together, they have delivered something here that sometimes catches your breath". At the festival Browning said, "Even reading the screenplay, it made me feel uncomfortable. But that was something that attracted me to it. I would prefer to polarise an audience as opposed to making an entertaining film everybody feels ambivalent about."

=== 2012–2020 ===
In 2012, she replaced English actress Ophelia Lovibond as female lead Florence Carter-Wood in the film Summer in February. The film is based on the book of the same title, by Jonathan Smith. In July 2012, Browning was cast in God Help the Girl, a musical film by Belle and Sebastian front-man Stuart Murdoch. Browning played Eve, and the role required live singing. Filming on the production began on 8 July 2012 and wrapped on 12 August 2012.

Browning was cast in Catherine Hardwicke's Plush alongside Cam Gigandet, replacing Evan Rachel Wood (who was originally attached to the project) due to scheduling conflicts. Browning also starred alongside Xavier Samuel whom she met on the set during filming. Magic Magic, directed by Sebastián Silva, screened at the 2013 Sundance Film Festival. Film.com designated the film as a "Top Pick".

Browning starred in Paul W. S. Anderson's 2014 epic romantic historical disaster film Pompeii. The project was filmed in Toronto and the city of Pompeii. The film received generally mixed to negative reviews, although Browning's performance was generally assessed more favorably. Browning took a break from filming on Pompeii, and returned home to Australia to film a music video for the song "No Matter What You Say" by the band Imperial Teen. The video follows Browning as the lead character, conducting a 'live art-piece'.

In 2014, Browning filmed Shangri-La Suite. The story follows two young lovers who break out of a mental hospital in 1974 and set out on a road trip to Los Angeles to fulfill the boy's lifelong dream of killing his idol Elvis Presley, who appears as a supporting character. Luke Grimes and Avan Jogia co-star. The same year, she appeared in Years & Years's "Take Shelter" music video.

In 2015, Browning appeared in the biopic crime thriller Legend, alongside Tom Hardy, who portrayed twin brothers and infamous 1960s London gangsters Reggie and Ronnie Kray. She portrayed Frances Shea, the first wife of Reggie Kray.

Browning was cast in American Gods (2017-2021) as Laura Moon. Neil Gaiman, author of the novel, said, "I've been fascinated by Emily Browning since A Series of Unfortunate Events. She has a challenge ahead of her: Laura is a tricky character, and the Laura on the screen is even trickier and more dangerous than the one on the page. She's going to have a wonderful time bringing Laura to life".

=== 2021–present ===
Browining appeared in Andrea Pallaoro's 2022 drama Monica, alongside Trace Lysette, Patricia Clarkson and Adriana Barraza, replacing Anna Paquin who had dropped out of the movie due to scheduling conflicts. As of 2022 she was also set to star in Lance Edmands' thriller Brightwater, starring alongside Scoot McNairy and Jack Reynor.

She stars in The Fox, the debut feature film directed by Australian filmmaker Dario Russo, which premieres at the 2025 Adelaide Film Festival in October. It also stars Jai Courtney, Damon Herriman, and the voices of Sam Neill and Olivia Colman.

== Personal life ==
From 2012 to 2013, she dated British actor Max Irons, whom she met while filming The Host. From 2013 to 2015, Browning was in a relationship with Plush co-star Xavier Samuel.

She married Eddie O'Keefe in April 2023.

When Browning was 21 years old, she moved to London, but then moved to Los Angeles when London became "too expensive to live". She initially disliked Los Angeles but then settled down on the Eastside and was residing there in 2023. She also has spoken on her depression and stated she has been doing therapy ever since being diagnosed.

Browning noted that she is spiritual but not religious: "I like the idea there is something innately magical about human connection. But I don't know, I'm okay with not knowing, and I get pissed off by anyone who claims to know for sure. A dogmatic atheist is just as annoying as a Bible-thumping crazy person."

== Filmography ==
=== Film ===
Year	Title	Role	Notes
2001	The Man Who Sued God	Rebecca Myers	
2002	Ghost Ship	Katie Harwood	
2003	Darkness Falls	Young Caitlin Greene	
2003	Ned Kelly	Grace Kelly	
2004	Lemony Snicket's A Series of Unfortunate Events	Violet Baudelaire	
2005	Stranded	Penny	Short film
2009	The Uninvited	Anna Ivers	
2011	Sucker Punch	Babydoll	
2011	Sleeping Beauty	Lucy	
2013	Magic Magic	Sara	
2013	The Host	Wanda	Uncredited cameo
2014	Summer in February	Florence Carter-Wood	
2014	Plush	Hayley	
2014	God Help the Girl	Eve	
2014	Pompeii	Cassia	
2015	Legend	Frances Shea	
2015	Shangri-La Suite	Karen Bird	
2017	Golden Exits	Naomi	
2022	Monica	Laura	
2025	One More Shot	Minnie Vernon	
2025	The Fox	Kori	Directed by Dario Russo

=== Television ===
Year	Title	Role	Notes
1998	The Echo of Thunder	Opal Ritchie	Television film
1999	High Flyers	Phoebe Mason	Recurring role, 13 episodes
2000	Thunderstone	Clio	Recurring role, 13 episodes
2000–2001	Something in the Air	Alicia	Recurring role (seasons 1–2), 5 episodes
2000–2002	Blue Heelers	Hayley Fulton	Recurring role (seasons 7–9), 9 episodes
2001	Blonde	Fleece	Television film
2001	Halifax f.p: Playing God	Kristy O'Connor	Episode: "Playing God"
2003	After the Deluge	Maddy	Television film
2017–2021	American Gods	Laura Moon / Essie MacGowan	Main role
2018–2019	The Affair	Sierra	Recurring role (seasons 4–5)
2023	Class of '07	Zoe	Main role
2023	American Horror Stories	Natessa	Episode: "Organ"
TBA	Prison Break: Black Creek	Cassidy Collins	Main role

=== Music videos ===
Year	Title	Artist(s)
2006	"Light Surrounding You"	Evermore
2013	"No Matter What You Say"	Imperial Teen
2014	"Take Shelter"	Years & Years

=== Video games ===
Year	Title	Role	Notes
2004	Lemony Snicket's A Series of Unfortunate Events	Violet Baudelaire	Voice role

== Awards and nominations ==
List of awards and nominations
Year	Work	Association	Category	Result	Refs
2002	Halifax f.p.	Australian Film Institute	Young Actor's Award	Won	
2005	Lemony Snicket's A Series of Unfortunate Events	Australian Film Institute	International Award for Best Actress	Won	
2005	Lemony Snicket's A Series of Unfortunate Events	BFCA Awards	Best Young Actress	Nominated	
2005	Lemony Snicket's A Series of Unfortunate Events	Young Artist Awards	Best Performance in a Feature Film, Leading Young Actress	Nominated	
2011	Sleeping Beauty	Hamptons International Film Festival	Breakthrough Performer	Won	
2026	One More Shot	AACTA Award	Best Lead Actress in Film	Pending	

== See also ==
- Cinema of Australia
