= Iron Lord (film) =

The Iron Lord
- Directed by: Dmitry Korobkin
- Screenplay by: Marina Koshkina
- Based on: Life of Yaroslav the Wise
- Produced by: Vadim Byrkin; Oleg Surkov
- Starring: Aleksander Ivashkevich; Svetlana Chuikina
- Music by: Andrey Komissarov; Gleb Matveyshuk
- Production company: Anno Domini - Style Agency
- Distributed by: 20th Century Fox
- Release date: 14 October 2010
- Running time: 99 minutes
- Country: Russia
- Language: Russian
- Budget: 125 million RUB

Iron Lord (Russian: Ярослав. Тысячу лет назад; Yaroslav, Tysyachu let Nazad (Yaroslav, A Thousand Years Ago)) is a 2010 Russian historical adventure film by director Dmitry Korobkin. It is a full-length feature film that tells the story of Yaroslav the Wise, and it was created as part of the preparation for the 1000th anniversary of Yaroslavl City. The young Russian prince Yaroslav fights against bandits, tribes, and invaders. He is the first to unite the Russian lands and create the original Russian state.

== Cast ==
- Aleksandr Ivashkevich as Yaroslav
- Svetlana Chuykina as Raida
- Aleksei Kravchenko as Harald
- Viktor Verzhbitskiy as Svyatozar
- Valery Zolotukhin as Churillo
