= Alexander Ivashkevich =

Georgian actor, tap dancer

- Александр Ивашкевич
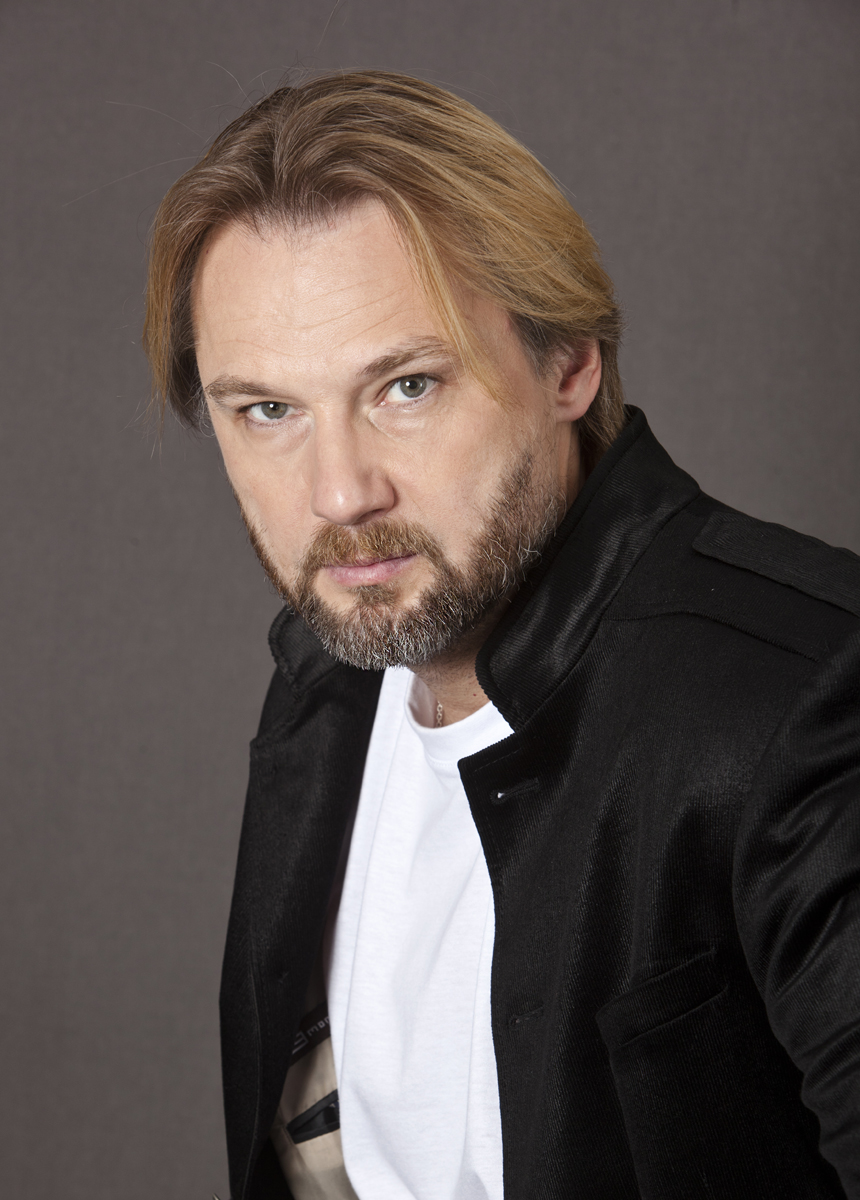
- Alexander Ivashkevich in 2011
- Born: Alexander Ivashkevich; April 27, 1960 (age 66); Tbilisi, Georgian SSR
- Citizenship: Estonia
- Occupations: Actor, dancer, choreographer
- Years active: 1985-present
- Website: Official website

Alexander Ivashkevich (alternately spelled as Aleksandr Ivaškevitš in Estonian, and as Aleksander Ivashkevich; Russian: Александр Ивашкевич) (born April 27, 1960) is a professional theater and movie actor and a tap dancer.

== Biography ==
Ivashkevich was born in Tbilisi on 27 April 1960 in a military family. After his parents divorced when he was seven, he moved with his mother to Kharkov. Ivashkevich was engaged in plastic arts, fencing, acrobatics and karate.

Since 1985, he has been a member of the troupe The Russian Theater of Estonia, until he was laid off in September 2025. He was one of the leading actors of the theater. For five years he sang in the choir of Alexander Nevsky Cathedral in Tallinn.

He performs only in Russian language. He worked in Estonian theaters as choreographer, staged stage movement.

Member of the Estonian Theatre Union since 1987, member of the Estonian Actors' Union since 1994.

=== Dance projects ===
In 1988, he began to practice tap dancing. Since 1995, he has also taught stage movement, dance and fencing at the Theater Studio at the Russian Theater, the School of Performing Arts Estonian Academy of Music and Theatre and Tallinn University, and also staged dances for performances. Between 1996—1997 was educated by American Tap Dance Orchestra in New York City.

Founder and leader of Duff Tap Studio. He has participated in various international dance projects in the U.S., Finland, Germany, Russia, Estonia, Bulgaria.

He has produced choreography for Estonian production musicals such as "Old Curiosity Shop", "Chicago", "Crazy for you", "No, No, Nanette!". In 2005, 2006 and 2008 he has participated with his dance studio Duff Tap at the IDO World Tapdance Championships in Germany, Riesa, where they won awards. In 1995 – 2007, 2010 he organized, produced and directed an annual show, Jazz & Tapp Show, which is dedicated to International Tap Dance Day. In different years, musicians and dancers from the US, Russia, Finland, Austria, France and Japan have taken part in these annual concerts.

=== Photography ===
At the age of 50, Ivashkevich became interested in Photography. By 2025, there were 30 individual and 16 collective exhibitions in European countries, participation in the "Biennale Fondazione Modigliani" in Venice, publications in magazines in Estonia and abroad. He has prizes and awards in the field of international artistic photography, his works are in private collections in Germany, Italy, Latvia, the Netherlands, Norway, Russia, Sweden., UK and USA. Ivashkevich's main works are portrait and boudoirphotography

=== Personal life ===
Ivashkevich had been married to actress of Russian Theatre of Estonia Ljubov Agapova, which ended in a divorce. He has been married to entrepreneur Terje Kross since 2010.

== Works ==
=== Parts in the theater ===
- 1986 — A Midsummer Night's Dream, by W. Shakespeare – Oberon and Lysander
- 1987 — Trap No.46, height 2" by Y. Schekochihin, director A. Tsukerman
- 1989 — Controversum by Pierre de Marivaux, director R. Polak - Azor
- 1991 — Ciao Rudi musical by P. Garinei and S. Giovannini, director M. Moreydo - Rudolfo
- 1993 — Butterflies Are Free by L. Gershe, director V. Filonov — Don Baker
- 1997 — The Hobgoblin by E. Wilde, director Ago-Endrik Kerge – Tiit Piibeleht
- 1997 — The vagaries of Marianne by A. De Musset, director S. Cherkasski – Octave
- 1998 — Sunset Boulevard by V. Denissov, director R. Viktyuk – Joe
- 1999 — The Taming of the Shrew by W. Shakespeare, J. Fletcher, director G. Korotkov – Petruchio
- 1999 — The Highway Crossing by J. Tätte, director J. Allik – Roland
- 2000 — The Idiot by F.M. Dostoyevsky, director Y. Jerjomin – Prince Lev Nikolayevich Myshkin
- 2000 — French Passion Near Moscow by L. Razumovskaja, director J. Nikolajev – Sergey Ivanovich
- 2002 — The Storm by A. Ostrovsky – Kuligin
- 2002 — Dates in June by A. Chekhov – Lomov
- 2003 — The Phantom of Love by Pedro Calderon de la Barca – Don Manuel
- 2003 — Toibele and her Devil by I. Bashevis Singer – Alhanon
- 2003 — The Naked Truth (Le Libertin) by E.-E. Schmitt – Denis Diderot
- 2005 — Happy Everyday! by J. Tätte, director R. Baskin – Fred
- 2006 — The Russian Laughter after F. Dostoevsky, director R.Kozak – Semjon Semjonovich
- 2007 — Dangerous Liaisons after Ch. de Laclos, director M. Tchumatchenko – Vikomte De Valmont
- 2008 — The Dresser by R. Harwood, director R. Baskin – Norman
- 2008 — Woe from Wit by A. Griboyedov, director Y. Jerjomnin – Alexandr Andreyevich Chatsky
- 2009 — Don Juan by J-B. Molière, director M. Bychkov – Don Juan
- 2010 — Frederick Or The Crime Boulevard by E.-E. Schmitt, director S. Morozov – Frédérick Lemaître
- 2012 — One summer night in Sweden by E. Josephson, director I. Taska – Tarkovsky
- 2012 — The Island of Polyn, after A. Yablonskaja "The Irons", director L. Manonina — Uncle Vanya (plays in Saint-Petersburg)
- 2013 — Yes, Mr. Prime Minister by J. Lynn and A. Jay, director I.Taska – The ambassador of Kumranistan
- 2014 — "Uncle Vanya" (A.Chekhov) ... Ivan Voinitsky
- 2011 — Five Evenings by A. Volodin, director A. Kladko – Iljin
- 2015 — Enemy based on the play Cosmetic of the Enemy author Amélie Nothomb, Jerome Anguest
- 2016 — The Last Floor based on the play of Vladimir Zaikin, dir. V.Zaikin - "Rebrov"
- 2022 — An Ordinary Miracle based on the play authored by Evgeny Schwartz (dir. Sergey Golomazov) — Wizard
- 2023 — The Marriage of Figaro by Pierre Beaumarchais (dir. Sergey Golomazov) — Count Almaviva
- 2025 — Der Theatermacher Thomas Bernhard (dir. Mindaugas Karbauskis) — Bruscon

=== Roles in cinema ===
- 1980 — A Name on the Snow - leading actor
- 1981 — The Last Cloud - leading actor
- 1981 — The Sweet Smell of Success" – supporting actor
- 1991 - Nude in the Hat dir. Alexander Polynnikov.
- 1992 — An Escape to the End of the World – leading actor
- 1993 — He'll get it hot – stunt man, stunt producer
- 2005–2006 — No other desires ("Elagin Island") – leading actor
- 2009 — Ivan the Terrible – Prince A. Kurbsky
- 2009–2010 — Iron Lord (also titled as Yaroslav - A millennium ago) - leading actor
- 2012 — The Dragon Syndrome – Malyshev
- 2012 — Celestial Wives of the Meadow Mari – premiered at the Rome Film Festival
- 2013 - On the Wings dir. Vlad Furman, the role of Kesh
- 2015 - Another Life of Margarita dir. Anastasia Popova, (main role) Georgy Avercheko
- 2015 - Adult Daughters dir. Andrew Eshpai, the role of Vladlen
- 2015 - How I Became a Russian dir. Konstantin Statsky, the role of "Mr. Eccles"
- 2015 - Sea Devils. Smerch 3 The Course of the Horse film number 25 directed by Alexandra Butko. Role Georgy Rud
- 2016 - House on the edge of the forest - dir. Valery Rozhnov role Arkady Evgenievich
- 2016 - Rustle - Victor, head of real estate agency
- 2016 - Mirra - dir. Andree Troitsky
- 2016 - "Winning" short film dir. Vlad Muko, the film awarded a special prize on Film Festival in Bishkek in 2017
- 2017 - Hotel Eleon - Alexander Ivanovich is an oligarch, at whom Fedya worked as a chef-cook "(60th series)
- 2024-2025 - Juvenile Inspektor: The Shadow Over Jõhvi

=== Awards ===
- 2000 — Named the best male drama actor in Estonia for the leading part in the play The Idiot. (Estonia)
- 2001 — Prizewinner at the festival "Drama 2001"; was awarded the Iron Rose.
- 2003 — Audience Choice Award in the season 2003/2004 in Russian Theater in Tallinn, Estonia
- 2004 — Named the best male drama actor of the year in Russian Theater in Tallinn, Estonia
- 2004 — Named the most professional teacher on the IV Republican Children's and Youth Festival of Music Theaters.
- 2011 — Nominated in the category "Best Actor" at the 19th International Film Festival and awarded as "Faithful and talented presentation" for his role in the movie "Yaroslav. A Milleinium ago". (Kostroma, Russia)
- 2012 — Awarded as "Best Film Actor" for his role in the movie "Yaroslav. Thousand years ago" at the 20th International Children's Film Festival "Artek". (Artek, Crimea)
- 2012 — Awarded a special prize for "Best choreographic work" for choreography "Libertango" by IV Youth Festival "Tap dance – 2012." (Yaroslavl, Russia)
- 2013 — Received the fund "Blagovest" for roles in "Five Evenings" and "One summer night in Sweden."
- 2014 - Awarded by the President of Estonia the Order of the "White Star", fifth degree, for special merits in the development of culture.
- 2014 - Awarded with the Order "Peace and Friendship" of year 2014 by the Guild of Actors of Russian Cinema and Moscow Peace Foundation.
- 2018 — Award "For Services to Tallinn" from the Tallinn City Council
