= Jonathan Smith (novelist) =

English writer and teacher

- Born: 1942 (age 83–84); Gloucestershire, England
- Occupations: Novelist, playwright, teacher
- Children: 2
- Writing career
- Genres: Historical fiction Semi-autobiographical

Jonathan Smith (born 1942) is an English novelist, playwright, writer and teacher. A career English teacher, best known for his novels, he has also written many radio plays.

== Early life and education ==
Smith was born in Gloucestershire to a family of teachers originally from the Rhondda Valley in South Wales. He was educated at Christ College, Brecon and read English at St John's College, Cambridge.

== Teaching and writing career ==
Smith took up his first teaching job at Loretto School near Edinburgh in Scotland. After a brief stint at Melbourne Grammar School in Australia, he taught at Tonbridge School for the rest of his career and was head of English for 17 years. He published five novels during his teaching career before retiring in 2002 to concentrate on writing. His former pupils at Tonbridge include Sir Anthony Seldon, novelist Vikram Seth, poet Christopher Reid, actor Dan Stevens and musician Kit Hesketh-Harvey.

A number of his works have been adapted for television and film. His first novel Wilfred and Eileen was adapted for into a four-part serial which aired in 1981 on BBC One. His first radio play The World Walk was adapted for television and aired on BBC Two. His 1995 novel Summer in February was adapted into a full-length film. The novel The Churchill Secret KBO, was adapted for a feature-length movie starring Michael Gambon, screened in 2016 on ITV under the title Churchill's Secret. His two radio plays on John Betjeman were broadcast on Radio 4 in 2017.

== Personal life ==
Smith and his wife Gillian have a daughter, Becky, an educational consultant, and a son, Ed, who is the former England National Cricket Selector, a former England cricketer and published author.

In 2006, shortly after being diagnosed with cancer, he and his son went on a trip to India. It was the inspiration for his book The Following Game, published in 2011.

== Bibliography ==
=== Novels ===
- Wilfred and Eileen (1976)
- The English Lover (1977)
- In Flight (1980)
- Come Back (1985)
- Summer in February. Abacus (1996). ISBN 978-0349107462
- Night Windows. Abacus (2004). ISBN 978-0349115313
- The Churchill Secret KBO. Abacus (2015).

=== Autobiographical ===
- The Learning Game: A Teacher's Inspirational Story. Abacus (2002). ISBN 978-0349113883
- The Following Game. Peridot Press (2011). ISBN 978-1-908095-01-5

=== Radio dramas ===
Over twenty plays including:

- Abandoned, about Auguste Rodin and Camille Claudel (BBC Radio 4)
- The Trenches Trip (BBC Radio 4)
- The Tennis Court (Radio 4)
- Portrait of Winston (Radio 4)
- Mr Betjeman's Class (Radio 4)
- Mr Betjeman Regrets (Radio 4)
- Silver dramatising the friendship between W E Henley and Robert Louis Stevenson
