= Gesche Gottfried =

German serial killer

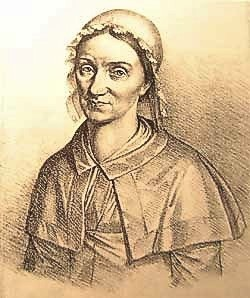
Gesche Gottfried (1785–1831)

Gesina Margarethe Gottfried (née Timm; 6 March 1785 – 21 April 1831), better known as Gesche Gottfried, was a German serial killer who murdered 15 people by arsenic poisoning in Bremen and Hanover between 1813 and 1827. She was the final person to be publicly executed in the city of Bremen.

== Psychiatric profile ==
Gesina (low-German: Gesche) Gottfried was born on 6 March 1785 in Bremen, as the daughter of seamstress Gesche Margarethe Timm and tailor Johann Timm. The family lived in her fathers house in the Pelzerstrasse. Her father encouraged her to marry at the first opportunity, and at age 21 she married Johann Miltenberg, who made a living as a saddler in Bremen. They had three children together. Things changed when Johan's father died and they inherited some money. Johan's behaviour changed and he began drinking and gambling. In 1813 he told Gesche that they were destitute and all the money was spent. A couple of months later, after a short period of stomach pain, he died.

A few months later she met Michael Kristof Gottfried, a relatively rich wine merchant.

Gesche's mother, Gesche Timm, died following stomach pain, in May 1815. Her own daughters then died, and the scope of victims widened. Coincidentally a cholera epidemic hit Germany around 1815 and helped to obscure her crimes. Moreover, Gesche helped greatly in the town during the epidemic, gaining the nickname the "Angel of Bremen".

In 1826 she sold her house to Johan and Wilhelmina Rumpff and they asked her to stay on as a housekeeper. This led to Wilhelmina's death. A maid left saying that illness and death followed Gesche. Johan Rumpff became ill but was now suspicious. He analyzed his food and found specks of white powder, which he took to local chemist Dr. Luce. He decided it was arsenic and notified authorities. Gesche found out and fled to Hanover, where she started killing again, starting with a Mrs. Schmidt and her daughter, who died in May 1827. In July Frederick Klein was killed.

She was captured by authorities on 6 March 1828, her 43rd birthday. News of her arrest quickly spread. She confessed to killing 15 people and to trying to kill many more.

The reasons behind Gottfried's crimes remain unclear and widely debated, but the emotional deprivation she suffered during her childhood and her modus operandi lead to the assumption that she suffered from Munchausen syndrome by proxy, a very common disorder among female serial killers.

Gottfried's victims included her parents, her two husbands, her fiancé, and her children. Before being suspected and convicted of the murders, she garnered widespread sympathy among the inhabitants of Bremen because so many of her family and friends fell ill and died. Because of her devoted nursing of the victims during their time of suffering, she was known as the "Angel of Bremen" until her murders were discovered.

== Modus operandi ==
She used a rat poison called "mouse butter" (in German "Mäusebutter"), very common at the time, which consisted of small flakes of arsenic trioxide mixed in animal fat. She mixed small doses into her victims' food, and when they started to get sick, she "friendly, selflessly and resignedly" offered to take care of them during their convalescence, while continuing to poison them.

During the period of her criminal activity, Gesche Gottfried was considered a model citizen and was well-liked in the community. Even after the constant loss of relatives who suffered, it seemed that the friendly, candid and kind Gesche chased a "cloud of misfortune". Her neighbours, moved by her zeal and resignation with caring not only for her family but also her sick friends, called her "the angel of Bremen".

== Gesche Gottfried's victims ==
- 1 October 1813: Johann Miltenberg (first husband)
- 2 May 1815: Gesche Margarethe Timm (mother)
- 10 May 1815: Johanna Gottfried (daughter)
- 18 May 1815: Adelheid Gottfried (daughter)
- 28 June 1815: Johann Timm (father)
- 22 September 1815: Heinrich Gottfried (son)
- 1 June 1816: Johann Timm (brother)
- 5 July 1817: Michael Christoph Gottfried (second husband)
- 1 June 1823: Paul Thomas Zimmermann (fiancé)
- 21 March 1825: Anna Lucia Meyerholz (music teacher and friend)
- 5 December 1825: Johann Mosees (neighbour, friend and advisor)
- 22 December 1826: Wilhelmine Rumpff (landlady)
- 13 May 1827: Elise Schmidt (daughter of Beta Schmidt)
- 15 May 1827: Beta Schmidt (friend, maid)
- 24 July 1827: Friedrich Kleine (friend, creditor; murdered in Hanover)

== Arrest, conviction and execution ==
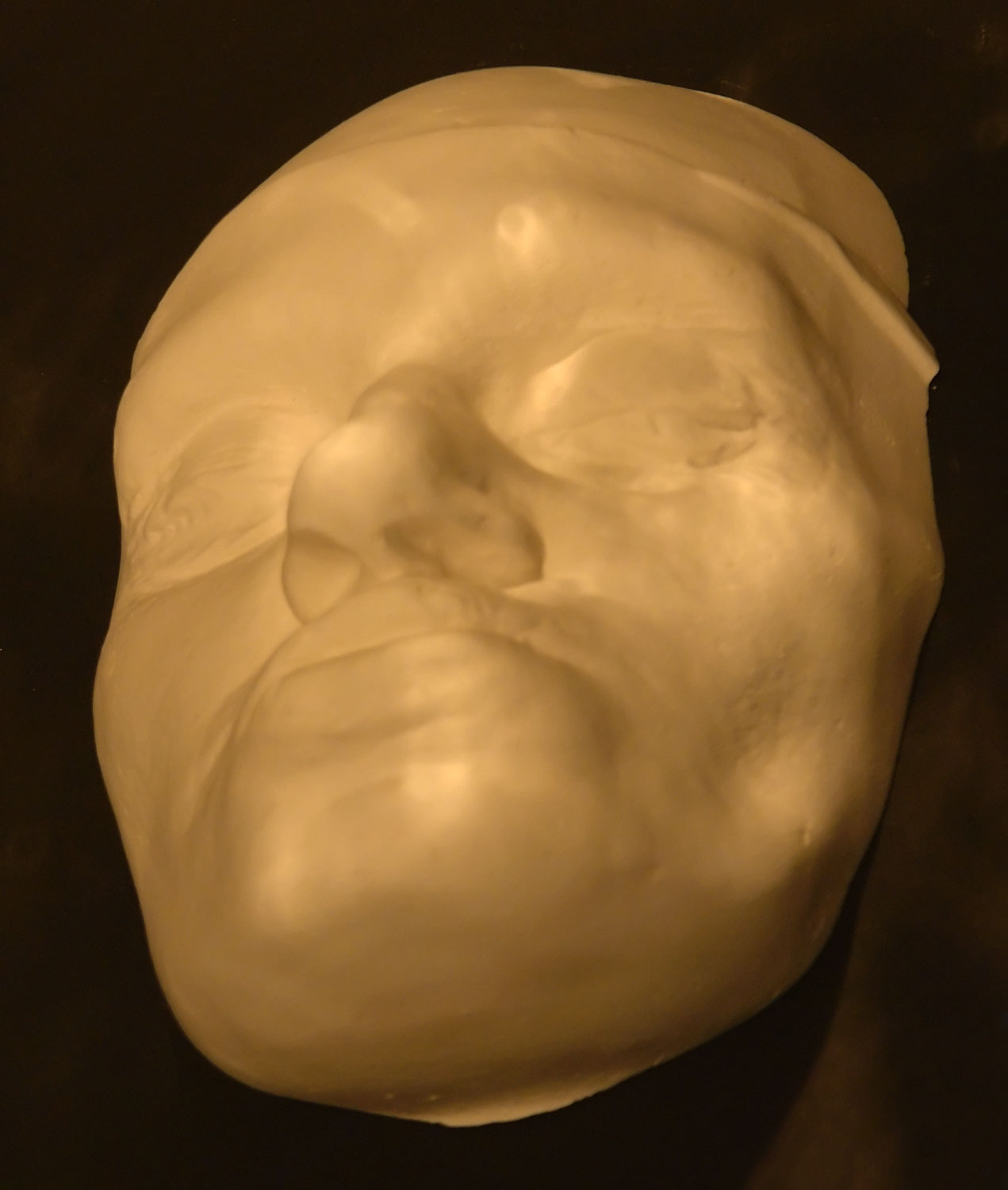
Death mask of Geshe Gottfried

Johann Christoph Rumpff would have been Gesche's twelfth victim if he hadn't become suspicious after finding small white granules on the food she had prepared for him. He confided to his physician, Dr. Luce, who had already attended several of the earlier victims, and handed over the substance he had found. Luce, in collaboration with an apothecary, determined that it was arsenic and alerted authorities.

On the night of 6 March 1828, her 43rd birthday, she was arrested. Sentenced to death by decapitation, she was publicly executed on 21 April 1831. It was the last public execution in the history of Bremen. Gottfried's death mask was made to study the facial patterns of criminal women. This is within the now-obsolete field of study of physiognomy.

== Influences on literature ==
Gottfried's crimes were the inspiration for several works of art and literature. One such work, a 2016 art book by Sarah Bodeman called GIFT: I Made This For You, ("Gift" is German for poison) is set up like a pamphlet with fourteen recipes for each of Gottfried's victims. All of the food was cooked and photographed with the same ingredients and in the same sequence as the original food that was made for Gottfried's victims. Another work titled "Gift" is a 2013 graphic novel by Peer Meter, with drawings by Barbara Yelin. It depicts Gottfried's story and her manner of poisoning her victims. Finally, in Murderesses in German Writing, 1720-1860: Heroines of Horror (2009), Susanne Kord discusses Gottfried and other woman murders, as well as how literature has portrayed these women.

Bremer Freiheit (1971) was a play by Rainer Werner Fassbinder, based on Geesche Gottfried's crimes. In 1972 Fassbinder shot a television version of his play starring Margit Carstensen.

Author Catherine Crowe wrote a short biographical essay on Gottfried detailing her crimes, in a piece entitled "Remarkable Female Criminals—The Poisoners of the Present Century" that appeared in Dublin University Magazine, January/February 1847, and later collected in volume 3 of Light and Darkness (1850).

== Gesche-Gottfried-Weg ==
In the Bremen district of Gröpelingen, a street was given the name Gesche-Gottfried-Weg.

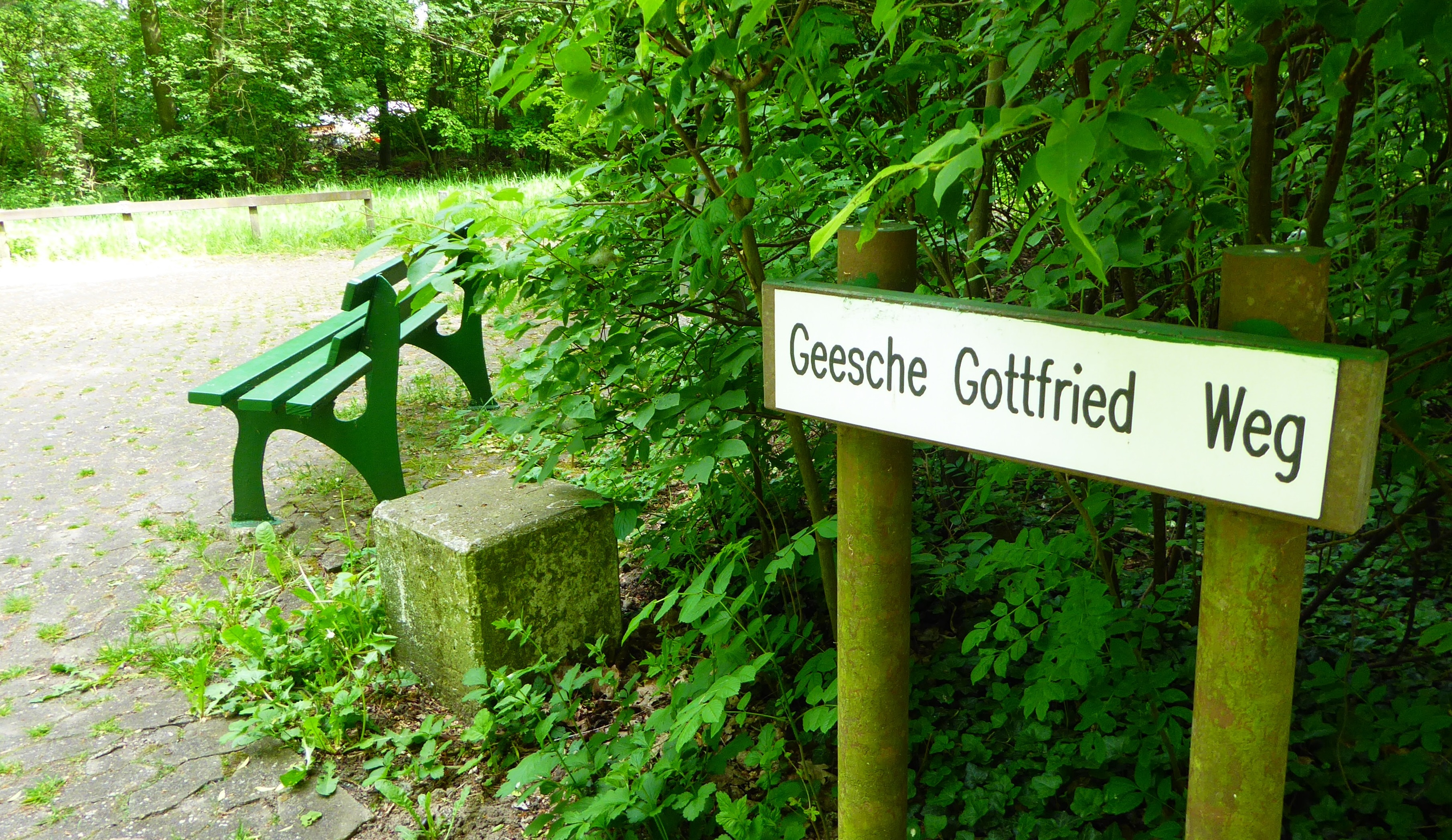
Gesche-Gottfried-Weg in Bremen

== See also ==
- List of German serial killers
