= Harold Knight (artist) =

British artist

Harold Knight RA (27 January 1874 – 3 October 1961) was an English portrait, genre and landscape painter.

Knight was born in Nottingham, England, the son of William Knight, architect, and studied at Nottingham School of Art under Wilson Foster. Nottingham had a reputation as among the best of the English provincial art schools and Knight won a series of prizes there, most notably for a series of oil studies of nudes. At the time he was considered to be the best student in the college. At the School of Art he met fellow artist Laura Johnson, whom he married in 1903. As Laura Knight, she became well known for her paintings of scenes from the ballet, circus and similar events.

After spending time in Paris, studying art under Jean-Paul Laurens and Jean-Joseph Benjamin-Constant, then at Staithes on the North Yorkshire coast, Harold Knight moved in 1907, with Laura, to Newlyn, a fishing port in Cornwall, where they became part of the Newlyn School.

During the First World War Knight's principles led him to be a conscientious objector, which earned him the rebuke of many of his colleagues and former friends, and put a strain on his physical and mental health, as he was required to work as a farm labourer. When the war ended, he and Laura moved to London, although they frequently returned to Cornwall to paint. His work was also part of the painting event in the art competition at the 1928 Summer Olympics.

Knight was elected a full member of the Royal Academy in 1937, and died in 1961 in Colwall, Herefordshire.
