= Revelation Films =

British film and television production and distribution company

- Type: Privately held company
- Industry: Home entertainment; Television production; Distribution
- Founded: 1992
- Founders: Tony Carne
- Headquarters: London, United Kingdom
- Key people: Tony Carne; Trevor Drane
- Products: Film; Television; DVD; Blu-ray
- Website: revelationfilms.co.uk

Revelation Films is a British film and television production and distribution company delivering visual entertainment via cinema, television and digital platforms.

== History ==
Tony Carne founded Revelation Films in 1992 as a video and television production business following a career at CBS/Fox, HarperCollins and Simitar Entertainment. Initially a production entity, the company earned two BAFTA nominations for the BBC with Out And About, a regional magazine series.

It also discovered a raw drag comedian called Paul O'Grady and introduced UK audiences to his alter ego Lily Savage. A national theatre tour followed and the TV show Paying The Rent was broadcast by Channel 4 and the Paramount Comedy Channel. Trevor Drane joined Carne in 1996 having previously been at First Independent Films where he collected a lifetime achievement award for Dirty Dancing and the Freddie Award at Hanna Barbera during his time as head of that companies home entertainment output.

== Production ==
Revelation Films is currently specialising in true crime documentaries.

=== Roster includes ===
- British Gangsters: Faces Of The Underworld – Based on the book Faces: A Photographic Journey Through The Underworld by Bernard O'Mahoney and Brian Anderson. Ran for two series on Discovery's Quest channel.
- Essex Boys: The Truth – Documentary feature chronicling the Rettendon murders, the aftermath and the emergence of the new generation of Essex Boys.
- The Krays: Kill Order – Documentary feature about the life and crimes of the Kray twins, told by their closest allies and bitter rivals.
- Gangster No.1: The Freddie Foreman Story – Documentary feature in which Foreman talks about his life and how he became one of the most feared men in London.
- The Feared: Irish Gangsters – Documentary feature about the undercurrent of violent and organised crime across Ireland.
- The Real Manhunter – Documentary series (Sky Crime) based on the casebooks of former Metropolitan Police DCI Colin Sutton.
- The Real Line Of Duty – Limited documentary series (Amazon Prime Video) telling the true stories that inspired hit drama Line Of Duty.

=== Other productions include ===
- Sir Patrick Moore's Journey To The Stars
- Lily Savage Live: Paying The Rent
- I Was There
- Starhunter Transformation

== Distribution ==
Since 1992, Revelation Films has licensed and distributed television and film on DVD and Blu-ray. It has made distribution deals with the BBC, Channel 4, ITV, CBS Home Entertainment, DHX Media, Discovery Communications, Freemantle Media, Funimation, Kew Media (formerly Content Media), MTV and 20th Century Fox.

=== Release highlights ===
==== Film ====
- Boss N Up (Snoop Dogg)
- Conversations With Other Women (Helena Bonham Carter)
- El Cantante (Jennifer Lopez)
- Stuart A Life Backwards (Benedict Cumberbatch, Tom Hardy)

==== Television ====
- Irwin Allen's The Time Tunnel, Land Of The Giants and Voyage To The Bottom Of The Sea
- Andromeda
- Dirty Sanchez
- Dogtanian and the Three Muskehounds
- Dr Quinn Medicine Woman
- Goodnight Sweetheart
- Highway To Heaven
- Lovejoy
- LA Law
- Rawhide
- Holocaust
- The Winds Of War
- Wire In The Blood
- Doogie Howser MD
- Two Guys, A Girl And A Pizza Place
- Lockie Leonard
