= Sexy Beast (TV series) =

British TV series

- Genre: Crime drama
- Based on: Sexy Beast by: Louis Mellis; David Scinto
- Developed by: Michael Caleo
- Country of origin: United Kingdom
- Original language: English
- No. of seasons: 1
- No. of episodes: 8

Production
- Executive producers: Michael Caleo; Nicole Clemens; Antony Smith; Michael Scheel; Juan Acosta; Alastair Galbraith; David Caffrey; Louis Mellis; David Scinto; Daniel O'Hara; Sophie Gardiner; Rupert Ryle-Hodgesare
- Producer: James Levison
- Production companies: Train a Comin' Productions; Paramount Television International Studios; AC Chapter One; Anonymous Content

Original release
- Network: Paramount+
- Release: 25 January – 29 February 2024

Sexy Beast is a British crime drama television series developed by Michael Caleo that premiered on Paramount+ on 25 January 2024. It is the prequel to the 2000 film Sexy Beast.

== Synopsis ==
Sexy Beast traces the relationship between best friends and thieves Gal Dove and Don Logan, who together become involved in London's criminal world during the 1990s. Gal begins a romance with the seductively alluring adult film star Deedee, which proves to be a dangerous endeavour.

== Cast and characters ==
=== Main ===
- James McArdle as Gal Dove
  - Cohen James Walmsley as young Gal
- Emun Elliott as Don Logan
  - Sami Amber as young Don
- Sarah Greene as Deedee Harrison
  - Naomi Morris as young Deedee
- Ralph Brown as Roger Riley
- Tamsin Greig as Cecilia Logan
  - Scarlett Rayner as young Cecilia
- Stephen Moyer as Teddy Bass
  - Ruaridh Mollica as young Teddy

=== Recurring ===
- Eliza Bennett as Marjorie Kern
- Michael Obiora as Dutch
- Clea Martin as Ann Marie Dove
- Nicholas Nunn as Freddie McGraw
- Peter Ferdinando as Dominic McGraw
- John Dagleish as Aitch
- Robbie Gee as Mace Grant
- Paul Kaye as Stan Higgins
- Barry Castagnola as Bloco
- Lex Shrapnel as Alan "Two Guns" Graves
- Cally Lawrence as Maddie Dove
- David Kennedy as Bert Dove
- Julian Rhind-Tutt as Sir Stephen Eaton
- Nitin Ganatra as Ricky Sidhu
- Alice Bailey Johnson as Linda Harrison
  - Chloe Acland as young Linda
- Hannah van der Westhuysen as Arabella Thornton

== Episodes ==
No.	Title	Directed by	Written by	Original release date
1	"More"	Michael Caleo	Michael Caleo, Louis Mellis, David Scinto	25 January 2024
2	"Donny Donny Donny"	Michael Caleo	Michael Caleo, Louis Mellis, David Scinto	25 January 2024
3	"Won't Soon Forget This"	Michael Caleo	Michael Caleo, Ed McCardie, Jennifer Cacicio	25 January 2024
4	"Always Wanted to See That Place"	David Caffrey	Michael Caleo, Lee Patterson, Louis Mellis	1 February 2024
5	"Trouble Is Real"	Alex Eslam	Michael Caleo, Louis Mellis, David Scinto	8 February 2024
6	"The Stag"	Alex Eslam	Michael Caleo, Ollie Masters, Juliet Lashinsky-Revene	15 February 2024
7	"You and Me"	Stephen Moyer	Alastair Galbraith, Michael Caleo, Tony Hamilton Shannon	22 February 2024
8	"Think of the Money"	Stephen Moyer	Michael Caleo, Louis Mellis, David Scinto	29 February 2024

== Production ==
=== Development ===
In August 2018, it was announced that a TV series prequel based on the original film, written, executive produced and showrun by Michael Caleo, would be made after Anonymous Content and Paramount Television acquired the TV rights. Louis Mellis and David Scinto, the writers of the original film, were also executive producing.

Paramount Network ordered a 10-episode season in July 2019, with Keith Cox and Lauren Ruggiero executive producing for Paramount Network and Matt Manfredi, Phil Hay and Karyn Kusama coming on as executive producers, Kusama as director also, through their Familystyle company.

The series was scrapped a year later in July 2020 by Paramount Network, allegedly because of budget cuts after the CBS–Viacom merger but with plans in mind to shop the series to another place. The series was eventually revived at Paramount+, with Train a Comin' Productions, Familystyle, Solas Mind, Anonymous Content, AC Chapter One and Paramount Television International Studios now producing instead of Paramount Television Studios.

=== Casting ===
In August 2022, it was reported that James McArdle, Emun Elliott, Tamsin Greig, Stephen Moyer and Sarah Greene were all part of the main cast as Gal Dove, Don Logan, Cecilia, Teddy Bass and Deedee Harrison respectively. Eliza Bennett, Clea Martin, Nicholas Nunn, Peter Ferdinando, John Dagleish, Robbie Gee, Paul Kaye, Lex Shrapnel, Cally Lawrence, David Kennedy, Julian Rhind-Tutt, Ralph Brown, Nitin Ganatra and Alice Bailey Johnson were all also cast in additional roles.

=== Filming ===
Set in 20th-century London, exterior filming has been in Liverpool.

== Release ==
On 4 December 2023, it was announced, together with first look photos, that the series would be released on 25 January 2024.
