= Sexy Beast =

2000 film by Jonathan Glazer

- Original film poster
- Directed by: Jonathan Glazer
- Written by: Louis Mellis; David Scinto
- Produced by: Jeremy Thomas
- Starring: Ray Winstone; Ben Kingsley; Ian McShane; Amanda Redman; Cavan Kendall; Julianne White; Álvaro Monje; James Fox
- Cinematography: Ivan Bird
- Edited by: John Scott; Sam Sneade
- Music by: Roque Baños; UNKLE; South
- Production companies: FilmFour; Kanzaman S.A. Recorded Picture Company; Jeremy Thomas Productions
- Distributed by: Fox Searchlight Pictures (through Hispano Foxfilms S.A.E; Spain); FilmFour Distributors (United Kingdom and Ireland)
- Release dates: 13 September 2000 (TIFF); 12 January 2001 (United Kingdom); 15 June 2001 (United States); 8 March 2002 (Spain)
- Running time: 88 minutes
- Countries: United Kingdom; Spain
- Language: English
- Budget: £2.3 million ($4.3 million)
- Box office: $10.2 million

Sexy Beast is a 2000 crime film directed by Jonathan Glazer (in his feature film directorial debut) and written by Louis Mellis and David Scinto. Starring Ray Winstone, Ben Kingsley, and Ian McShane, it follows Gary "Gal" Dove (Winstone), a retired criminal visited by a gangster (Kingsley) who demands that he take part in a bank robbery in London.

Sexy Beast was critically acclaimed, and Kingsley's performance won him Best Actor at the British Independent Film Awards. Total Film named Sexy Beast the 15th best British film of all time. It was the final film to feature Cavan Kendall, who died of cancer shortly after filming ended. A prequel TV series, Sexy Beast, premiered in 2024.

== Plot ==
The British criminal Gary "Gal" Dove is happily retired on the Costa del Sol with his beloved wife DeeDee, his friend Aitch, and Aitch's wife Jackie. An old criminal associate, the feared Don Logan, arrives, intent on enlisting Gal for a bank robbery in London planned by the crime lord Teddy Bass. Teddy learned about the bank vault from Harry, the bank's chairman, whom he met at an orgy. Gal declines, but Don pressures him, growing increasingly aggressive.

After Gal suggests that Don's real reason for visiting is his infatuation with Jackie, with whom he had a brief affair, Don grows furious and leaves. On the plane back to England, Don refuses to extinguish his cigarette prior to takeoff, is aggressive to staff and other passengers, and is ejected. He avoids punishment by claiming that a flight attendant sexually assaulted him. He returns to the villa screaming obscenities and attacks Gal with a glass bottle. DeeDee shoots Don with Gal's hunting shotgun, incapacitating him. The group kills him and buries him under the swimming pool.

Gal arrives for the job in London. When Teddy questions Gal about Don's whereabouts, Gal lies, claiming that Don called him after landing at Heathrow Airport, which arouses suspicion in Teddy. The gang use diving gear to drill into the bank vault from a pool in a neighbouring bathhouse. The pool water floods the vault, shorting its security system. As Teddy's crew empties the safe deposit boxes, Gal secretly pockets a pair of ruby and diamond earrings.

After the job, Teddy insists on driving Gal to the airport. He stops at Harry's home, where he shoots Harry dead and demands that Gal tell him where Don is. Gal responds that he is "not into this any more". While dropping Gal off, Teddy implies that Gal would be punished if Teddy cared about Don. He suggests he may visit him in Spain and humiliates him by paying him only £10 for the job.

Gal returns to his friends and family in Spain, where DeeDee wears the earrings. Gal still hears Don's voice in his head. He responds that Don is dead now and can "shut up".

== Cast ==
- Ray Winstone as Gary "Gal" Dove, a retired criminal who married DeeDee and moved to Spain to start a new life
- Ben Kingsley as Don Logan, a violent sociopath and recruiter for the London underworld
- Ian McShane as Teddy Bass, a London crime boss
- Amanda Redman as DeeDee Dove, Gal's beloved wife and a former porn star
- James Fox as Harry, a banker who shows Bass the vault
- Cavan Kendall as Aitch, Gal's best friend
- Julianne White as Jackie, Aitch's wife, who had a fling with Don
- Álvaro Monje as Enrique, a Spanish boy who helps Gal around the house

== Production ==
The writers of the stage play that the film is based on, Louis Mellis and David Scinto, had previously been behind the production of Gangster No. 1 (2000) with Jonathan Glazer tapped to direct. Due to casting problems, the three left the production. According to Scinto, "SEXY BEAST was born, out of a reaction to all that chaos and soap opera. Initially it was an incomplete stage play, entitled, GANGSTER NO. 2, as we were writing a trilogy. We were naming our pieces like paintings, drawing a lot of inspiration from the art world. We used Francis Bacon as a source of reference for GANGSTER NO. 1, Hockney was mentioned for SEXY BEAST and Magritte for 44 INCH CHEST." (44 Inch Chest was later turned into a film in 2009).

Sexy Beast was shot in London and Agua Amarga, Spain in the summer of 1999. Ray Winstone travelled to Spain two weeks before filming commenced to get as deep a tan as he could in the time possible and to eat as much as he could to bulk up considerably. He later called this "the best rehearsal time I've ever had in my life". Winstone had originally been considered for the role of Don, along with Anthony Hopkins.

The producer Jeremy Thomas remembered his experience making the film:

"Sexy Beast was the beginning of a new phase for me of working with first-time filmmakers. Jonathan Glazer was a television commercials director in the UK, and a wonderful talent. We were sent this script which he was attached to, and out came this wonderful film. It was very stimulating having a first time talent... The dialogue as you see in this film is exceptional. I had never read a script like it, and I thought, this has got to be made. It was very difficult to get insurance on the film actually. When the American studio bought the film, their legal department said: "You cannot make this." It has something like 300 uses of the word "cunt", and 400 "fucks", but somehow it passed the censorship and got out there."

Technical elements of the heist have been compared with those in the 1979 film Sewers of Gold, which also starred McShane in the central role.

In a 2001 interview, Glazer stated that the film had a good deal of conflict during production, ranging from personality conflicts to spending nearly a year in post-production. Mellis and Scinto spent 10 weeks without Glazer editing to realign their story after Glazer's failed edit. Glazer then went back in to complete the heist sequence as Mellis and Scinto were required to fulfill another assignment. Glazer noted at the time that it was the "steepest, sharpest [learning curve] I could have." While Glazer stated his plan to do another film with Mellis and Scinto in Alligator Blood for Fox Searchlight, this did not come to pass.

== Reception ==
The film has an approval rating of 87% on Rotten Tomatoes, based on 143 reviews. The site's critical consensus states, "Sexy Beast rises above other movies in the British gangster genre due to its performances—particularly an electrifying one by Ben Kingsley—and the script's attention to character development." Metacritic, which uses a weighted average, assigned the film a score of 79 out of 100, based on 30 critics, indicating "generally favorable" reviews.

It received praise from writers at the San Francisco Chronicle, Entertainment Weekly, Slate, Rolling Stone and the Los Angeles Times. Stephen Hunter of The Washington Post was less enthusiastic, highlighting "Ben Kingsley spraying saliva-lubricated variants of the F-word into the atmosphere like anti-aircraft fire for 10 solid minutes" as the film's "one guilty pleasure". Slant named Ben Kingsley's role in its list of "15 Famous Movie Psychopaths". Sexy Beast grossed $10.2 million on a budget of $4.3 million.

== Awards and honours ==
Kingsley's performance received a majority of the accolades given to Sexy Beast, winning Best Supporting Actor awards from the Broadcast Film Critics Association, Boston Society of Film Critics, Dallas-Fort Worth Film Critics Association, Florida Film Critics Circle, San Diego Film Critics Society, Southeastern Film Critics Association and the Toronto Film Critics Association. He also was nominated for a Screen Actors Guild Award (losing to Ian McKellen for his performance in The Lord of the Rings: The Fellowship of the Ring), a Golden Globe and an Academy Award (losing both to Jim Broadbent for his performance in Iris).

The film also won Best Director and Best Screenplay from the British Independent Film Awards and Special Recognition ("For excellence in film making") from the National Board of Review.

== Music ==
Original music for the film was composed by Spanish composer/saxophonist Roque Baños and English electronic band UNKLE in collaboration with South. Dean Martin's version of "Sway" accompanies the film's end credits. The soundtrack also includes "Peaches" by The Stranglers, "Cuba" by The Gibson Brothers, "G-Spot" by Wayne Marshall, "Daddy Rollin' Stone" by Derek Martin, and Henry Mancini's "Lujon".

== In popular culture ==
Brian Sella of The Front Bottoms attributes the band's name to a line spoken by Ben Kingsley in the film. Another line spoken by Kingsley inspired The Kooks' song "Jackie Big Tits".

Ben Kingsley reprised his role as Don Logan in a series of advertisements, also directed by Glazer, promoting the Band Aid 20 single and 2004 DVD issue of the Live Aid concert.

== Television series ==
A prequel television series based on the film was in development at Paramount Network, which was being produced by Paramount Television Studios and Anonymous Content. However, the series was scrapped by Paramount Network. On 15 February 2022, ViacomCBS Networks UK And Australia announced that the series was revived for Paramount+, but would instead be produced by Train a Comin' Productions, Familystyle, Chapter One, Solas Mind, Anonymous Content and Paramount Television International Studios. The eight-episode series was released on 25 January 2024.

== See also ==
- Gangster No. 1
- 44 Inch Chest
- Heist film
- List of hood films
