= Jamie Foreman =

British actor (born 1958)

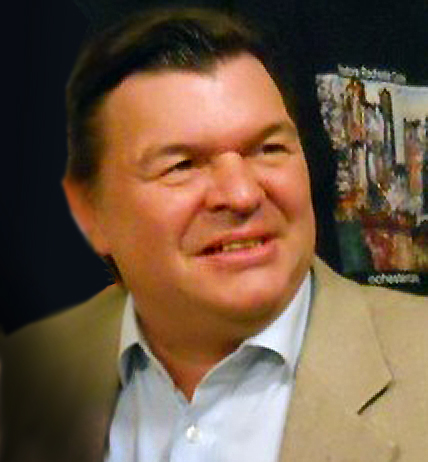
- Foreman in 2011
- Born: 25 May 1958 (age 68); Lambeth, Greater London, England
- Education: Christ's College, Blackheath; Italia Conti Academy of Theatre Arts
- Occupation: Actor
- Years active: 1977–present
- Known for: Role of Derek Branning in EastEnders (2011–2012)
- Notable work: Gangster No. 1 (2000); Layer Cake (2004)
- Spouse: Carol Harrison (divorced)
- Partner: Julie Dennis
- Children: 3
- Father: Freddie Foreman

Jamie Foreman (born 25 May 1958) is a British actor. The younger son of English gangster Freddie Foreman, he is best known for his role as Derek Branning in the BBC One soap opera EastEnders (2011–2012).

Foreman has also appeared in the crime drama film Gangster No. 1 (2000) and the crime thriller film Layer Cake (2004).

== Early life ==
Foreman was born in Lambeth, Greater London, on 25 May 1958, the younger son and middle child of Freddie Foreman, a prominent London underworld figure, and his wife, Maureen Elsie (née Puttnam). He was raised in South London alongside his two siblings, an elder brother and a younger sister.

Foreman received a private education funded by his father's criminal activities, attending Oakfield Preparatory School in Dulwich, followed by Christ's College in Blackheath. During his childhood, Foreman and his siblings were kept completely unaware of their father's criminal associations and involvement with the Kray twins. He first learned about his father's background at ten years old, following a police raid on their residence in 1968. Foreman later recounted that whilst visiting his father in prison was a painful experience, he viewed him as an excellent parent who was proud that his children chose legitimate careers over a life of crime.

Foreman's godfather was barman Buster Edwards, who later participated in the Great Train Robbery. He was a close family friend of actress Dame Barbara Windsor, whom he credits with inspiring his decision to pursue a career in the theatre.

== Career ==
Foreman began his professional acting career in 1977 at the National Theatre, training under the artistic directorship of Laurence Olivier. He initially auditioned for the Italia Conti Academy of Theatre Arts, where selectors bluntly informed him that his performance was the "worst audition since Anthony Newley", though he was ultimately accepted into the institution. His early screen work included appearances in the children's film Sky Pirates (1977), the Roger Daltrey biographical film McVicar (1980), and the crime thriller Empire State (1987). Throughout the 1980s and 1990s, he built an extensive resume as a character actor, frequently guest-starring in mainstream British television series such as Inspector Morse, The Bill, and Casualty.

In 1997, Foreman achieved wider critical recognition for his performance as Mark, a racist taxi driver, in Gary Oldman's acclaimed gritty drama Nil by Mouth, starring opposite Ray Winstone and Kathy Burke. The performance established him within the British crime and drama genres, leading to prominent roles in the historical film Elizabeth (1998), the American gothic horror Sleepy Hollow (1999), and the cult crime feature Gangster No. 1 (2000). Foreman continued to work steadily in the 2000s, appearing as a racist cabbie in The Football Factory (2004) and as Duke in Matthew Vaughn's crime film Layer Cake (2004). In 2005, he portrayed the iconic antagonist Bill Sikes in Roman Polanski's film adaptation of Oliver Twist. He also expanded into fantasy and high-profile guest roles, appearing as Eddie Connolly in the 2006 Doctor Who episode "The Idiot's Lantern" and portraying Basta in the adventure film Inkheart (2008).

In 2011, Foreman joined the cast of the BBC soap opera EastEnders, taking over the role of the major antagonist Derek Branning from Terence Beesley. He intentionally negotiated a short-term, 12-to-13 month contract to avoid professional burnout, describing the filming schedule as "like a factory" and the hardest workload of his life. During his brief tenure, he filmed 150 episodes, routinely managing up to 36 scenes per day and workin six days a week before the character was written out via a fatal heart attack in December 2012.

Following his departure from the soap opera, Foreman appeared as Lenny in the sitcom Birds of a Feather and narrated the ITV documentary series Double Decker Driving School (2015). He also established a consistent presence on BBC Radio, starring in the title role of Wes Bell, co-starring in the comedy series Hazelbach, and playing Albert Wilson in the long-running BBC Radio 4 historical drama Home Front starting in 2015. In later years, he returned to British independent crime films, appearing as Sam across the Rise of the Footsoldier film franchise, including Rise of the Footsoldier: The Pat Tate Story (2017), Rise of the Footsoldier: Vengeance (2023), and Rise of the Footsoldier: Retribution (2026).

== Personal life ==
Foreman was previously married to actress Carol Harrison, with whom he has a son. Following their divorce, Foreman reunited with his long-term partner, Julie Dennis, a former model, and the couple have two sons.

Foreman is a lifelong Tottenham Hotspur F.C. supporter.

In 2011, Foreman published his autobiography, Gangsters, Guns and Me: Now I'm in EastEnders... but Once I Was on the Run. The title of his memoir references a period of his childhood when his family frequently relocated across the East End of London to stay ahead of the authorities due to his father's criminal activities, before eventually settling in Kennington when he was six years old, as well as his early youth when he was uprooted to live on the run internationally with his father, hiding in Tenerife and Pennsylvania, after a major smuggling operation went wrong.

In 2018, Foreman suffered a near-fatal heart attack, a health crisis that drew widespread media attention due to its real-life parallel with the death of his EastEnders character, Derek Branning, who died from a heart attack on Christmas Day 2012. Foreman later stated that the medical ordeal provided him with a new perspective on managing work-related stress.

== Filmography ==
Year	Title	Role	Notes	Ref.
1977	Holding On	Charlie as a youth	2 episodes	
1977	King of the Castle	Ripper, Warrior	6 episodes	
1977	The Dick Emery Show	Actor	Episode: "Episode #15.3"	
1977–1978	A Bunch of Fives	Chris Taylor	14 episodes	
1978	Wings	Airman Bates	2 episodes	
1979	ITV Playhouse	Andy	Episode: "The Quiz Kid"	
1979	Testament of Youth	Cockney Patient	Episode: "1915"; as Jamey Foreman	
1980	Armchair Thriller	Operator 1, First Operator	3 episodes	
1980	McVicar	Driver		
1980	Sky Pirates	Sidney		
1981	Kinvig	Clerk	Episode: "Creature of the Xux"	
1982	Squadron	Doger Dickens	Episode: "Mascot"	
1983	Johnny Jarvis	Manning	5 episodes	
1984	Letty	Pete Sloan	2 episodes	
1984	Shine on Harvey Moon	Plumber's Mate	Episode: "Fools Rush In"	
1985	Relative Strangers	Customer	Episode: "Episode #1.7"	
1985	Dempsey and Makepeace	Ramsey	Episode: "No Surrender"	
1985, 1990, 1992, 1996, 1997	The Bill	Barrowboy, Peter Bull, Russ Turner, Theo Lentos, James Fender	5 episodes	
1987	Empire State	Danny		
1988	London's Burning	D.C. Pope	Episode: "Episode #1.1"	
1988	The Moneymen	1st Dealer		
1988	Witness	Ron Darker	Episode: "Linda's Secret"	
1989	Beyond Soho	Danny		
1989	First and Last	Dave		
1991, 2011–2012	EastEnders	Contractor, Derek Branning	151 episodes	
1992	Inspector Morse	Chas	Episode: "Happy Families"	
1992	Between the Lines	P.C. Roper	Episode: "Out of the Game"	
1993	Get Back	Mike	Episode: "Drive My Car"	
1994	The House of Eliott	Gerry Althorpe	6 episodes	
1994	Screen One	Wells	Episode: "Doggin' Around"	
1995, 1999, 2008	Casualty	Phil Pearson, Gil Stephens, Henry	4 episodes	
1995	I.D.	Previous Team #2		
1997	The Detectives	Billy	Episode: "Cardiac Arrest"	
1997	Nil by Mouth	Mark		
1997	Melissa	2nd Hood	2 episodes	
1997	The Hunger	Dean	Episode: "The Swords"	
1997	Our Boy	Orme		
1997	Bugs	Decker	Episode: "Identity Crisis"	
1998	Elizabeth	Earl of Sussex		
1998	Holiday Park	Self – Holidaymaker	Episode: "Episode #1.2"	
1999	This Year's Love	Billy		
1999	Murder Most Horrid	DS Brown	Episode: "Whoopi Stone"	
1999	Sleepy Hollow	Thuggish Constable		
1999	Love Story	Dave		
1999, 2006	An Audience with...	Self – Audience Member	2 episodes; Uncredited	
2000	Saving Grace	China		
2000	Black Cab	Dave	Episode: "Talk Radio"	
2000	Gangster No. 1	Lennie Taylor		
2000	Remember a Day	The Record Producer		
2000	Breathtaking	Brian Maitland		
2000–2001	Without Motive	DC Jim Boulter	12 episodes	
2001	Goodbye Charlie Bright	Tony		
2001	Micawber	Ismail Kane	Episode: "Micawber Learns the Truth"	
2001	High Stakes	Brian Wallis	4 episodes	
2002	Rescue Me	Roy Carter	Episode: "Episode #1.3"	
2002	Murder in Mind	Stuart Jackson	Episode: "Flashback"	
2002	Out of Control	Jim		
2003	Danielle Cable: Eyewitness	Keith Phelan		
2003	I'll Sleep When I'm Dead	Mickser		
2003	Family	Dave Cutler	6 episodes	
2004	Family Business	Marky Brooker	6 episodes	
2004	The Football Factory	Cabbie		
2004	Layer Cake	Duke		
2004	The Terry and Gaby Show	Self		
2005	The Last Detective	Leonard Crowe	Episode: "Willesden Confidential"	
2005	Oliver Twist	Bill Sykes		
2005	Empire Movie Awards 2005	Self		
2005	The DVD Collection	Self	Episode: "Episode #7.8"	
2005	The Paul O'Grady Show	Self	Episode: "Episode #3.20"; as Jamie Forman	
2005, 2011	Soccer AM	Self	2 episodes	
2006	My Family	Terry	Episode: "An Embarrassment of Susans"	
2006	Doctor Who	Eddie Connolly	Episode: "The Idiot's Lantern"	
2006	Twist by Polanski	Self		
2006	The World's Greatest Actor	Self		
2006	It's a Happy Movie: The Children's Making-of	Self		
2006	Doctor Who Confidential	Self		
2007	Hustle	Dickie Brennan	Episode: "Signing Up to Wealth"	
2007	Botched	Peter		
2007	Partypoker.com European Open III	Self	Episode: "Celebrity Heat"	
2007	Roy Shaw Fight School	Self		
2007	British Film Forever	Self	Episode: "Guns, Gangsters and Getaways: The Story of the British Crime Thriller"	
2008	Heroes and Villains	Slave Trader	Episode: "Spartacus"	
2008	The City Speaks	Man	Episode: "Pushing"	
2008	Out There	Graham		
2008	Inkheart	Basta		
2009	The Devil's Wedding	The Narrator		
2009	Minder	Danny Blake	Episode: "Thank Your Lucky Stars"	
2009	Law & Order: UK	P.C. Ray Griffin	Episode: "Samaritan"	
2010	Just for the Record	Graham		
2010	Baseline	Terry		
2011	Ironclad	Jedediah Coteral		
2011	Screwed	Rumpole		
2011, 2013	Daybreak	Self	2 episodes	
2011, 2014, 2016	The Wright Stuff	Self – Guest Panelist	3 episodes	
2012	The Grind	Dave		
2012	St George's Day	Nixon		
2012	The One Show	Self – Guest	Episode: "Episode #7.18"	
2012	Dead End	Dog		
2012–2014	This Morning	Self	3 episodes	
2014	The Hooligan Factory	Actor	Uncredited	
2014, 2016	Birds of a Feather	Lenny	3 episodes	
2016	Weekend	Self – Guest	Episode: "Episode #3.3"	
2017	Porters	Alan	Episode: "Episode Two"	
2017	Rise of the Footsoldier 3: The Pat Tate Story	Sam		
2018	The Bromley Boys	Charlie McQueen		
2018	Degenerates	Victor Moseley		
2018	Kitty Lumley	Albert		
2019	Once Upon a Time in London	Alf White		
2020	Break	Monty		
2023	Rise of the Footsoldier: Vengeance	Sam		
2026	Rise of the Footsoldier: Retribution	Sam		
2027	Retracing Jemma	Frank	2 episodes	

== Awards and nominations ==
Year	Awards	Category	Work	Result	Ref.
2012	TV Quick Awards	Best Soap Newcomer	Derek Branning in EastEnders	Nominated	
2012	The British Soap Awards	Best Newcomer	Derek Branning in EastEnders	Nominated	
2012	All About Soap Awards	Best Villain	Derek Branning in EastEnders	Nominated	
2013	The British Soap Awards	Villain of the Year	Derek Branning in EastEnders	Nominated	
2013	The British Soap Awards	Best Exit	Derek Branning in EastEnders	Nominated	
2013	All About Soap Awards	Best Death	Derek Branning in EastEnders	Nominated	
2013	All About Soap Awards	Best Reveal	Derek Branning in EastEnders	Nominated	
