= Freddie Foreman =

English criminal (1932–2026)

- Foreman in 2021
- Born: Frederick Gerald Foreman; 5 March 1932; Battersea, London, England
- Died: 10 October 2026 (aged 94); West London, England
- Other names: Brown Bread Fred; The Guv'nor; The Mean Machine; The Undertaker; One of the Chaps (Note: Other names included Mr. Fix-It, The Cleanup Man, The Godfather of British Crime, The High Executioner, The Last Real Gangster, and The Managing Director of British Crime.)
- Occupations: Businessman, author
- Years active: 1946–2024
- Organization: The Firm
- Known for: Prominent post-war British crime figure; Kray twins associate
- Notable work: Respect (1996); Fred (2018)
- Spouse: Maureen Puttnam (m. 1952; died 2014) (Note: While many mainstream sources incorrectly report Puttnam's death year as 2015, official General Register Office records confirm her death occurred in 2014.)
- Partner: Janice King (1980s–2026; his death)
- Children: 3, including Jamie
- Relatives: Carol Harrison (daughter-in-law)
- Status: Released in 1995 after serving five years
- Convictions: Accessory to the murder of Jack McVitie (1969); Accessory after the fact to a customs raid incident (1982); Handling stolen goods from the Security Express robbery (1990)
- Criminal charges: Accessory to murder (1969); Accessory after the fact (1982); Handling the proceeds of an armed robbery (1990)
- Penalty: 10 years imprisonment (1969); 2 years suspended sentence (1982); 9 years imprisonment (1990)
- Accomplices: Ronnie Kray; Reggie Kray; Charlie Kray

Details
- Date: 1967–1983
- Country: United Kingdom
- State: London
- Date apprehended: 1968 (Kray firm arrests); 1989 (Deported from Spain)

Frederick Gerald Foreman (5 March 1932 – 10 October 2026) was an English criminal and a prominent figure in London gangland from the 1950s through to the 1980s. He was a key associate of the Kray twins.

Nicknamed Brown Bread Fred ("brown bread" being Cockney rhyming slang for "dead") due to his involvement in disposing of bodies, he was alternatively styled by the press as The Guv'nor, The Mean Machine, or The Undertaker. He rejected formal gangland titles, preferring to describe himself simply as One of the Chaps. He was acquitted of murder at the Central Criminal Court (Old Bailey) a record four times over his career. Over his lifetime, he served a total of 16 years imprisonment across 15 different prisons.

Following his permanent exit from the penal system, he published his debut autobiography, Respect (1996), which instantly generated global headlines due to his written confessions to the murders of Frank "Mad Axeman" Mitchell and Tommy "Ginger" Marks. His verbal confessions during a 2000 television documentary sparked a renewed public outcry that directly contributed to the passing of the Criminal Justice Act 2003, which reformed the United Kingdom's double jeopardy laws. He was subsequently the subject of the biographical documentary film, Fred (2018).

== Early life and background ==
Frederick Gerald Foreman was born on 5 March 1932 at 22 Sheepcote Lane in Battersea, London. He was the youngest of five sons born to Herbert Edward George Foreman, a blacksmith and First World War veteran of Irish extraction, and his wife, Louisa Elizabeth "Lou" (née White). His elder brothers were Alfred Edward "Herbie" Foreman, Arthur Walter Frederick "Wally" Foreman, George William Clarence Foreman, and Albert Frank "Bert" Foreman. During the Battle of the Somme, his father sustained a severe shrapnel injury to his arm, which ended his blacksmithing career and resulted in a lifelong resentment of authority. His father served several prison sentences for assault and battery. Conversely, Foreman's maternal uncle, Edward Horace "Ted" White, attained the rank of chief constable of Durham, which caused family friction during his visits to London. During his childhood, Foreman witnessed local street fighting, which involved both his father and his paternal grandmother.

The family initially lived in a terraced house next to a public house named The Flag, where the five brothers shared a single bedroom. In 1939, the property was demolished, and the family moved to a municipal flat in Wandsworth. Following the outbreak of the Second World War, his elder brothers joined the armed forces, whilst Foreman was evacuated five times to locations including Woking, Northampton, and Hove. When he returned to London, the family home had been destroyed by bombing.

Foreman participated in amateur boxing at the Jack Solomons gym in Soho to address behavioural issues, competing as a welterweight on the same tournament programme as Henry Cooper. He left school at the age of 14 to work as a delivery driver's assistant for Southern Railway. He later worked as a warehouseman and a scaffolder, leaving the latter occupation after a fall.

Foreman subsequently operated in the post-war black market, engaging in vehicle theft, hijacking cargo transport, and robbing post offices. In 1948, at the age of 16, he was convicted at the Central Criminal Court (Old Bailey) for inflicting grievous bodily harm during a fight at a youth club, resulting in a £5 fine. After a period in a youth detention centre, he avoided National Service by presenting with a psychiatric illness to a military medical board. When he was 18, his mother discovered a handgun hidden in his bedroom.

== Career and criminal history ==
Following his youth, Foreman established multiple commercial ventures across South London to launder the profits of his unlawful operations. These enterprises encompassed a boxing gym, a network of bookmakers, and a Balham gambling club that featured an opening appearance by American actor George Raft. He also managed a firm dealing in imported slot machines and formed the Bookmakers' Guardian Association, which offered financial backing, legal representation, and loan insurance to bookmakers. Additionally, he took over the tenancy of the Prince of Wales public house on Lant Street in Southwark, operating as its landlord. During the 1950s, he operated as a minder for underworld figure Billy Hill.

By the early 1950s, Foreman had established a South London gang that included individuals who would later execute the Great Train Robbery, such as Buster Edwards and Tommy Wisbey. During this period, he worked as a security coordinator and driver for the Forty Thieves, an all-female shoplifting syndicate that targeted West End department stores, including Harrods. In 1963, Foreman declined a proposal, reportedly linked to British Intelligence, to carry out a heist in Panama City alongside Panamanian politician Roberto Arias. Whilst he consistently maintained that he did not participate directly in the 1963 Great Train Robbery, he admitted to being approached beforehand. Allegations circulated that he avoided arrest by acting as an informant for Detective Superintendent Frank Williams; Foreman asserted that he placed £60,000 in cash from the heist proceeds inside a telephone kiosk as a bribe for Williams, who subsequently handed the money in. Foreman later organised the 1965 prison breakout and transit to Australia for train robber Ronnie Biggs, and provided refuge to Buster Edwards. In 1963, his firm carried out the Paul Street bullion raid, stealing £200,000.

Foreman relocated his activities to the East End of London, following a furniture shop raid in Southampton, where he met Ronnie and Reggie. The Kray twins supplied him with a flat located opposite The Blind Beggar public house in Stepney. Introduced to the East End underworld by Charlie Kray, Foreman integrated into their syndicate, known as The Firm. His involvement escalated to armed robberies targeting banks, payrolls, and transit wages, utilising pickaxe handles, masks, and oxyacetylene cutters. The crew frequently targeted postal vans for pension cash, with Foreman sometimes disguising himself as a postal worker whilst waiting outside target locations. Following the 1966 shooting of George Cornell by Ronnie Kray at the Blind Beggar, Foreman intimidated witnesses to obstruct the police investigation.

Operating as a principal enforcer for The Firm, Foreman was involved in several underworld deaths. In 1965, he shot and killed used-car dealer Tommy "Ginger" Marks outside a Bethnal Green nightclub owned by the Krays, and the victim's body was never recovered. The killing remained unsolved for a decade until an informant named Foreman, but due to a lack of positive identification, he was acquitted at the Central Criminal Court (Old Bailey) in 1975. The execution was reportedly carried out because Marks had previously shot Foreman's brother, George, during a dispute. Foreman concealed Marks's body in weighted chicken wire and disposed of it at sea. In December 1966, following the prison breakout of Frank "Mad Axeman" Mitchell, The Firm became concerned regarding Mitchell's erratic behaviour. Mitchell was lured into a transit van where Foreman and an accomplice, Alfie Gerrard, shot him. His body was wrapped in chicken wire, weighted down, and dumped into the English Channel, and was never recovered.

In October 1967, Reggie Kray killed gang member Jack "the Hat" McVitie at a flat in Stoke Newington. Following the killing, associate Tony Lambrianou wrapped the corpse in a bedspread and abandoned the stolen vehicle containing the body in Rotherhithe. When the Kray twins learned the corpse had been left in open view, Foreman was contacted at his Southwark public house and instructed to remove the vehicle and the body, which he collected at dawn and disposed of at sea near Newhaven. Following the 1969 convictions of the Kray twins, Foreman was sentenced to ten years in prison as an accessory for his role in hiding McVitie's body, serving six years before his release.

Following his release in the mid-1970s, police questioned Foreman regarding the 1974 disappearance of Lord Lucan, though no charges were brought against him. He briefly returned to commercial business after acquiring 60 pool table sites using a £10,000 loan, which generated £3,000 per week. In 1979, following an investigation into a raid where a customs officer was killed, Foreman left the United Kingdom using a forged passport. He settled in Allentown, Pennsylvania, where he ran a slot machine and vending business for two years before returning to London, where he received a two-year suspended sentence as an accessory.

In 1982, Foreman relocated to Marbella, Spain, where he ran a local entertainment venue and lived near former footballer Bobby Charlton and entertainer Max Bygraves. On 25 April 1983, while residing abroad, Foreman participated in the Security Express robbery in Shoreditch, during which a team of six masked men stole £7 million in cash, weighing five tons, after restraining a security guard and threatening him to obtain the vault combinations. Following the heist, Foreman escaped back to the Costa del Sol along with Ronnie Knight, utilising the absence of an Anglo-Spanish extradition treaty. His life in Spain ended when Spanish authorities apprehended him in 1989, leading to his extradition to the United Kingdom. Whilst acquitted of executing the physical robbery, he was convicted of handling stolen proceeds alongside co-defendants Ronnie Knight, John Mason, Ronnie Everett, and Clifford Saxe. He received a nine-year prison sentence, contributing to a lifetime total of 16 years imprisonment spent across 15 separate facilities. During a subsequent incarceration at Brixton Prison, he was housed alongside Gerry Conlon of the Guildford Four. Foreman informed Conlon that the Crown Prosecution Service would not contest the Guildford Four's appeal, remaining with him until the official announcement was broadcast on the radio.

Following his final release from custody at Maidstone Prison in 1995, Foreman resided in Cricklewood, North London, and served as a pallbearer at Ronnie Kray's funeral. He maintained contact with the Kray twins during their incarceration and visited Reggie Kray shortly after his release. Foreman authored eight volumes of memoirs. His first book, Respect, was published in 1996 following a £10,000 advance and launched at the Café Royal, creating international front-page news by containing his written confessions to the murders of Frank Mitchell and Tommy Marks. His subsequent publications include Brown Bread Fred (2007), The Godfather of British Crime (2009), and The Last Real Gangster (2015), the latter featuring a foreword by actor Tom Hardy. In a 2000 ITV television documentary titled The Krays, Foreman publicly repeated these confessions on camera. Due to the historic double jeopardy rule, he could not be retried for murder following previous acquittals, and subsequent charges of perjury and perverting the course of justice were dropped by the Crown Prosecution Service. Although the double jeopardy rule was abolished in 2003 for cases containing new and compelling evidence, Foreman was never retried. In his later years, he publicly reconciled with the arresting detective, Leonard "Nipper" Read. He also served as an underworld advisor for the 2015 biographical film Legend.

An independent, feature-length documentary charting Foreman's life story, titled Fred (also released as Fred: The Godfather of British Crime), was released in 2018. The project was written and directed by filmmaker Paul Van Carter, following an initial approach by Foreman. Production was handled by Salon Pictures with distribution managed via Lionsgate Home Entertainment. After debuting at the CPH:DOX festival in March 2018, the film made its British premiere at London's Genesis Cinema on 13 April 2018 before being released on home media platforms that June. The 85-minute film focused on a reflective examination of Foreman at the age of 85, relying primarily on a central interview alongside family photographs and historical film reels. The chronological narrative explored his upbringing in London during the Second World War, his entry into organised crime, and his relationship with the Kray twins. The documentary incorporated commentary from sociologist Dick Hobbs and author Wensley Clarkson. Commentators noted that the documentary functioned as a sociological study of a former enforcer reflecting on his past and isolation in his later years.

Foreman maintained a criminal philosophy that opposed petty criminals who targeted individuals within their own communities, specifically voicing contempt for muggers, housebreakers, pickpockets, and joyriders. However, records and accounts of his criminal career indicate an explosive temper when encountering rivals or individuals he deemed problematic, frequently utilising weapons such as pickaxe handles, coshes, revolvers, and sawn-off shotguns.

== Personal life and death ==
In 1952, Foreman married his childhood sweetheart, Maureen Elsie Puttnam, in Southwark, London. They had three children: two sons and a daughter. He used his criminal earnings to finance private education for his children, enrolling his sons at Oakfield Preparatory School in Dulwich and Christ's College in Blackheath. His younger son, Jamie Foreman, became an actor, appearing in the television soap opera EastEnders and films including Gangster No. 1 and Layer Cake.

The couple later separated but remained married until Puttnam's death on 9 April 2014. He had eight grandchildren, including actors Gregory Forsyth-Foreman—who appeared in the television medical drama Casualty—and Alfie Foreman Harrison. Foreman was the godfather of sculptor and musician Nick Reynolds (son of Bruce Reynolds) and author Marilyn Wiseby (daughter of Tommy Wiseby).

Following his separation in the 1980s, Foreman entered into a long-term relationship with Janice King, whom he met whilst operating a venue in Spain. The couple cohabited in a villa near Marbella during his period as a fugitive and remained partners following his return to the United Kingdom.

In 2018, a report by Vice magazine stated that Foreman was without financial assets and temporarily estranged from his family. He subsequently lived in a flat in Maida Vale, West London, before moving into a nursing home for his retirement. Prior to this, he received medical treatment at St Mary's Hospital, London.

Following a short illness, Foreman died on 10 October 2026 at a care home in West London. He was 94. His death was reported in the British media, with obituaries published in The Daily Telegraph, The Times, and The Guardian.

== Filmography ==
Year	Title	Role	Notes
1987	The Cook Report	Self	Episode: "Costa del Crime"
1999, 2003	Secret History	Self – Former South London Gang Leader	2 episodes
2000	The Krays	Self	2 episodes
2001	Reggie Kray: The Final Words	Self – Associate	Television documentary
2001, 2008	Real Crime	Self – London Gangster	2 episodes
2009	Jason Marriner Football Hooligan	Self	Television documentary
2010	The Krays by Fred Dinenage	Self	Television documentary
2011	Britain's Underworld	Self	Episode: "Costa Del Crime"
2012	British Gangsters: Faces of the Underworld	Self	Episode: "London"
2013	Die Gentlemen baten zur Kasse	Self	Television documentary
2015	The Krays: The Myth Behind the Legend	Self – Associate of The Firm	Television documentary
2016	Chancers	Self	Television documentary
2016	The Krays: The Prison Years	Self	Television documentary
2018	Fred	Self	Biographical documentary film
2019	Gangster No 1 – The Freddie Foreman Story	Self	Television documentary
2020	Dave Courtney's Underworld – The Krays	Self	Television documentary
2024	True Crime Stories	Self	Television documentary

== Bibliography ==
- Foreman, Freddie; Lisners, John (1996). Respect: Autobiography of Freddie Foreman – Managing Director of British Crime. Century. ISBN 978-0712676885.
- Foreman, Freddie; Lambrianou, Tony (2001). Getting It Straight: Villains Talking. Sidgwick & Jackson. ISBN 978-0283072789.
- Foreman, Freddie; Maysh, Jeff (2007). Brown Bread Fred: The Autobiography of the Godfather of British Crime. John Blake Publishing. ISBN 978-1844544837.
- Foreman, Freddie (2009). The Godfather of British Crime. John Blake Publishing. ISBN 978-1844546893.
- Foreman, Freddie; Kurylo, Frank; Kurylo, Noelle (2015). The Last Real Gangster: The Final Truth About the Krays and the Underworld We Lived In. John Blake Publishing. ISBN 978-1784184179.
- Foreman, Freddie; Simpson, Christian; Wraith, Steve (2016). The Freddie Foreman Photograph Album: 211. Mojo Risin' Publishing. ISBN 978-0993442483.
- Foreman, Freddie; Wraith, Steve; Jackson, Neil; Lear, Wayne (2016). The Krays & Freddie Foreman: Read All About It. Media Arts. ISBN 978-0992702311.
- Foreman, Freddie (2017). Running with the Krays: My Life Among the Icons of British Crime. John Blake Publishing. ISBN 978-1786062802.
- Foreman, Freddie; Alun, Owen; Simpson, Christian (2019). The Making Of Fred. Media Arts. ISBN 978-0992702373.
