= A Bunch of Fives =

British children's TV series (1977–1978)

- Created by: Colin Rogers
- Starring: Lesley Manville; Jamie Foreman; Andrew Rinous; Gary Oldman
- Country of origin: United Kingdom
- No. of series: 2
- No. of episodes: 14

Production
- Camera setup: Multiple camera
- Running time: 25 minutes
- Production company: ATV

Original release
- Network: ITV
- Release: 18 May 1977 – 24 May 1978

A Bunch of Fives is an English children's television show from ATV, broadcast for two series of seven episodes each in 1977 and 1978 on ITV. A precursor of Grange Hill, it starred Andrew Rinous, Lesley Manville and Jamie Foreman as fifth formers who start a school newspaper. The show spawned one paperback tie-in.

The series was released on DVD by Network in May 2010.

== Episodes ==
Series	Episodes	Originally released	
Series	Episodes	First released	Last released
1	7	18 May 1977	29 June 1977
2	7	12 April 1978	24 May 1978

=== Series 1 (1977) ===
No. overall	No. in series	Title	Directed by	Written by	Original release date
1	1	"Do It Yourself"	John Sichel	Paula Milne	18 May 1977
2	2	"The Critic"	John Sichel	Paula Milne	25 May 1977
3	3	"The Gig"	John Sichel	Paula Milne	1 June 1977
4	4	"Cry for Help"	John Sichel	William Humble	8 June 1977
5	5	"The Chip Shop Mafia"	John Sichel	William Humble	15 June 1977
6	6	"Proof"	John Sichel	William Humble	22 June 1977
7	7	"The Sell Out"	John Sichel	Paula Milne	29 June 1977

=== Series 2 (1978) ===
No. overall	No. in series	Title	Directed by	Written by	Original release date
8	1	"Influences"	Richard Bramall	Paula Milne	12 April 1978
9	2	"A Star Is Born"	Richard Bramall	Paula Milne	19 April 1978
10	3	"Playback"	Richard Bramall	Paula Milne	26 April 1978
11	4	"The Mock"	Richard Bramall	Paula Milne	3 May 1978
12	5	"The Letter"	Richard Bramall	Paula Milne	10 May 1978
13	6	"Making Deals"	Richard Bramall	Jim Haddon	17 May 1978
14	7	"Celebration"	Richard Bramall	Jim Haddon	24 May 1978
