= British Gangsters: Faces of the Underworld =

- Genre: Documentary
- Created by: Brian Anderson
- Directed by: Bruce Burgess / Chris Matthews
- Presented by: Bernard O’Mahoney (proper wrongin)
- Narrated by: Bernard O’Mahoney (proper wrongin)
- Opening theme: Complicated Shadows by We Were Lions
- Ending theme: Complicated Shadows by We Were Lions
- Composer: Elvis Costello
- Country of origin: United Kingdom
- Original language: English
- No. of seasons: 2
- No. of episodes: 14

Production
- Running time: 620 Minutes

Original release
- Network: Quest
- Release: 25 April 2014 – 2015

British Gangsters: Faces of the Underworld is a documentary series about UK gangsters or 'Faces'. Series 1 (6 episodes), Series2 (8 episodes) it based on the book Faces by Brian Anderson

In each episode, current and former gang members and active criminals are interviewed by presenter and former member of the Essex Boys gang, Bernard O'Mahoney. Many episodes concentrate on cities around the UK: London, Liverpool, Glasgow, Manchester, Birmingham. Other episodes focus on how individuals became involved in crime and miscarriages of justice. Series 2, Ep 3, travels to Ireland.

Some of the most infamous and influential names within these criminal circles appear on screen for the first time including Paul Ferris, Eddie Richardson, Dutch Raja and Arran Coghlan

The series was broadcast on Discovery's Quest channel in the UK in April 2014 (S1) and July 2015 (S2). Both have been released on DVD by Revelation Films

== Episodes ==
The first series contains 6 episodes:

1. Glasgow – Featuring interviews with Walter Norval, 'Mad' Frankie Fraser, Joe Steele, Paul Ferris, Ian 'Blink' McDonald
2. Manchester – Featuring interviews with Jimmy 'The Weed' Donnelly, Arthur Donnelly, Paul Massey, Sean Keating, Bernard O'Mahoney, Wayne Barker, David Fraser, Christopher Brayford
3. London – Featuring interviews with 'Mad' Frankie Fraser, Eddie Richardson, David Fraser, Freddie Foreman, Billy Frost, Albert Donoghue, Jimmy Tippett, Lenny Hamilton
4. Newcastle – Featuring interviews with Paddy Conroy, Billy Robinson, Kenny 'Panda' Anderson, Viv Graham Jnr, Mike 'The Bull' Bullock, Brian 'The Taxman' Cockerill
5. Your Money or Your Life? – Featuring interviews with Vic Dark, Mick Healy, Ian 'Blink' McDonald, Angelo Hayman, Danny Woollard, Freddie Foreman, Bernard O'Mahoney, John Whomes
6. Goodfellas? – Featuring interviews with Freddie Foreman, David Fraser, Brian 'The Taxman' Cockerill, Ian 'Blink' McDonald, Arran Coghlan, Joe Steele, Desmond Noonan, Joey Gilligan, Vic Dark, Paddy Conroy, Paul Massey, Paul Ferris

The second series contains 8 episodes:

1. Liverpool – Featuring interviews with Stephen "The Devil" French, Kevin Mooney, Nicola Regan, Graham "Boris" Boszomenyi, Brian Charrington Jnr.
2. Birmingham – Featuring interviews with Albert Chapman, Patsy Manning, Don Tear, Joe Egan, Sharif Cousins, "Zimbo" Moore, christopher brayford
3. Alternative Ulster – Featuring interviews with Christy Dunne, "Mad Dog" Johnny Adair, Sam "Skelly" McCrory, Joe Doherty, Billy "Buffalo" Clare, Wayne Hart
4. Essex – Featuring interviews with Eddie Blundell, Billy Blundell, Lew Yates, Andy Swallow, Steve "Nipper" Ellis, Sandy Percival
5. Live by the Sword – Featuring interviews with Phil Berriman, Steve "Nipper" Ellis, Dominic Negan, William "Billy" Lobben,
6. Die by the Sword – Featuring interviews with Paddy Hill, Stephen "The Devil" French, Eileen Mackenney, Shelley Mackenney,
7. My Generation – Dougie Joyce, Johnny Joyce, Dutch Raja, Allan Morrison
8. Cons to Icons – Dave Courtney, William Lobben, Chris Thrall, Lew Yates
