= Ian McShane =

English actor (born 1942)

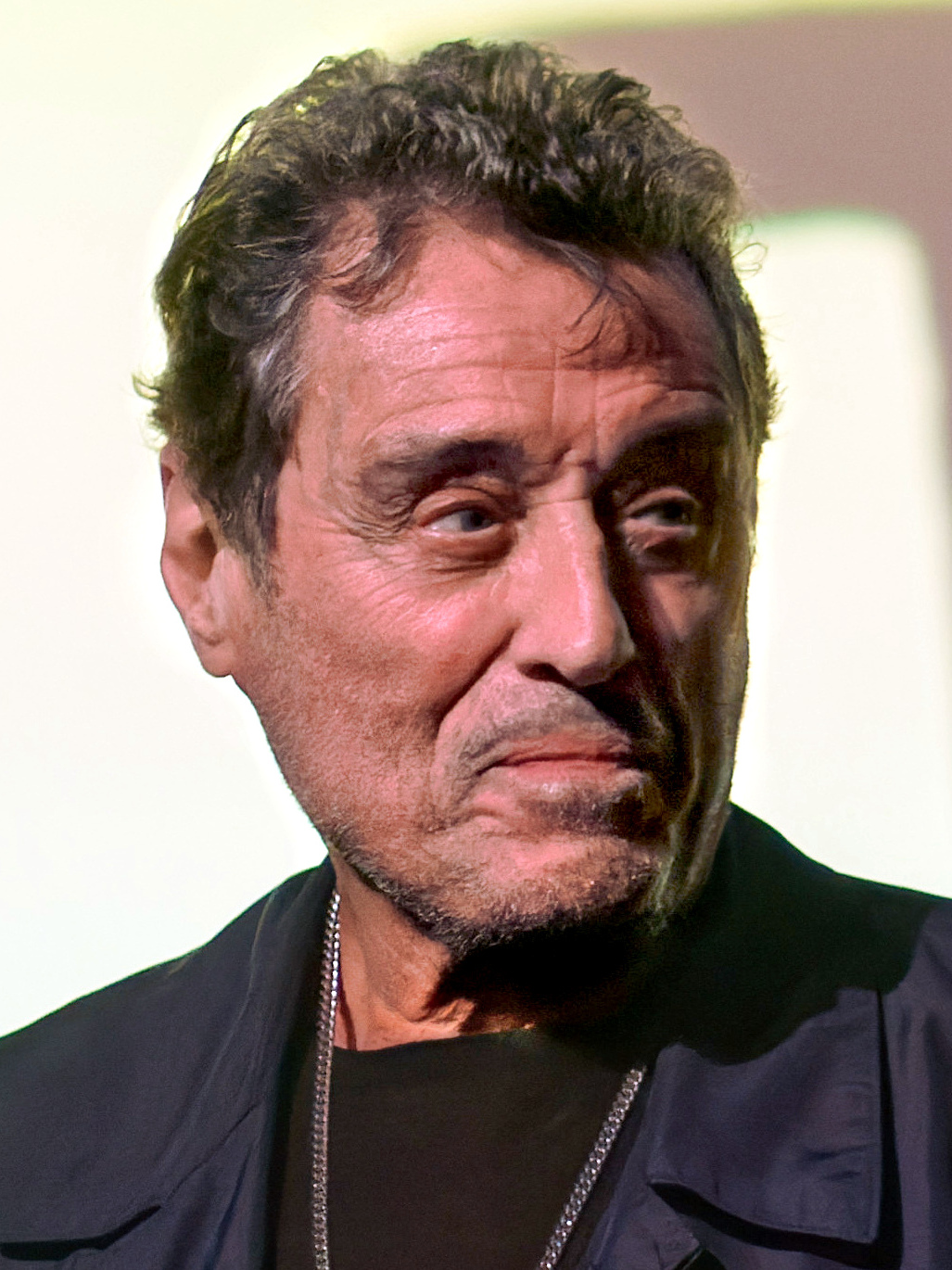
- McShane in 2022
- Born: Ian David McShane; 29 September 1942 (age 84); Blackburn, Lancashire, England
- Education: Royal Academy of Dramatic Art
- Occupation: Actor
- Years active: 1962–present
- Spouses: Suzan Farmer (m. 1965; div. 1968); Ruth Post (m. 1970; div. 1975); Gwen Humble (m. 1980)
- Children: 2
- Father: Harry McShane

Ian David McShane (born 29 September 1942) is an English actor. His television performances include the title role in the BBC series Lovejoy (1986, 1991–1994), Al Swearengen in Deadwood (2004–2006) and its 2019 film continuation, and Mr. Wednesday in American Gods (2017–2021). For the original series of Deadwood, McShane won the Golden Globe Award for Best Actor – Television Series Drama and received a nomination for the Primetime Emmy Award for Outstanding Lead Actor in a Drama Series. As a producer of the film, he was nominated for the Primetime Emmy Award for Outstanding Television Movie.

His film roles include Harry Brown in The Wild and the Willing (1962), Charlie Cartwright in If It's Tuesday, This Must Be Belgium (1969), Sgt. Pilot Andy Moore in Battle of Britain (1969), Wolfe Lissner in Villain (1971), Teddy Bass in Sexy Beast (2000), Frank Powell in Hot Rod (2007), Tai Lung in Kung Fu Panda (2008) and Kung Fu Panda 4 (2024), Blackbeard in Pirates of the Caribbean: On Stranger Tides (2011), and Winston Scott in the John Wick franchise (2014–present).

== Early life ==
McShane was born in Blackburn, Lancashire on 29 September 1942. He is the child of professional footballer Harry (1920–2012) and Irene McShane (née Cowley; 1921–2021). His father was Scottish, from Holytown, Lanarkshire. His mother, who was born in England, was of Irish and English descent. McShane grew up in Davyhulme, Lancashire (now in Greater Manchester), and attended Stretford Grammar School. After being a member of the National Youth Theatre, he studied at the Royal Academy of Dramatic Art (RADA) with Anthony Hopkins and John Hurt. McShane shared a flat with Hurt, whom he called his "oldest friend in the business", and was still a student at RADA when he appeared with Hurt in his first film, The Wild and the Willing, in 1962. He later played Satan in the York Mystery Plays in 1963.

== Career ==
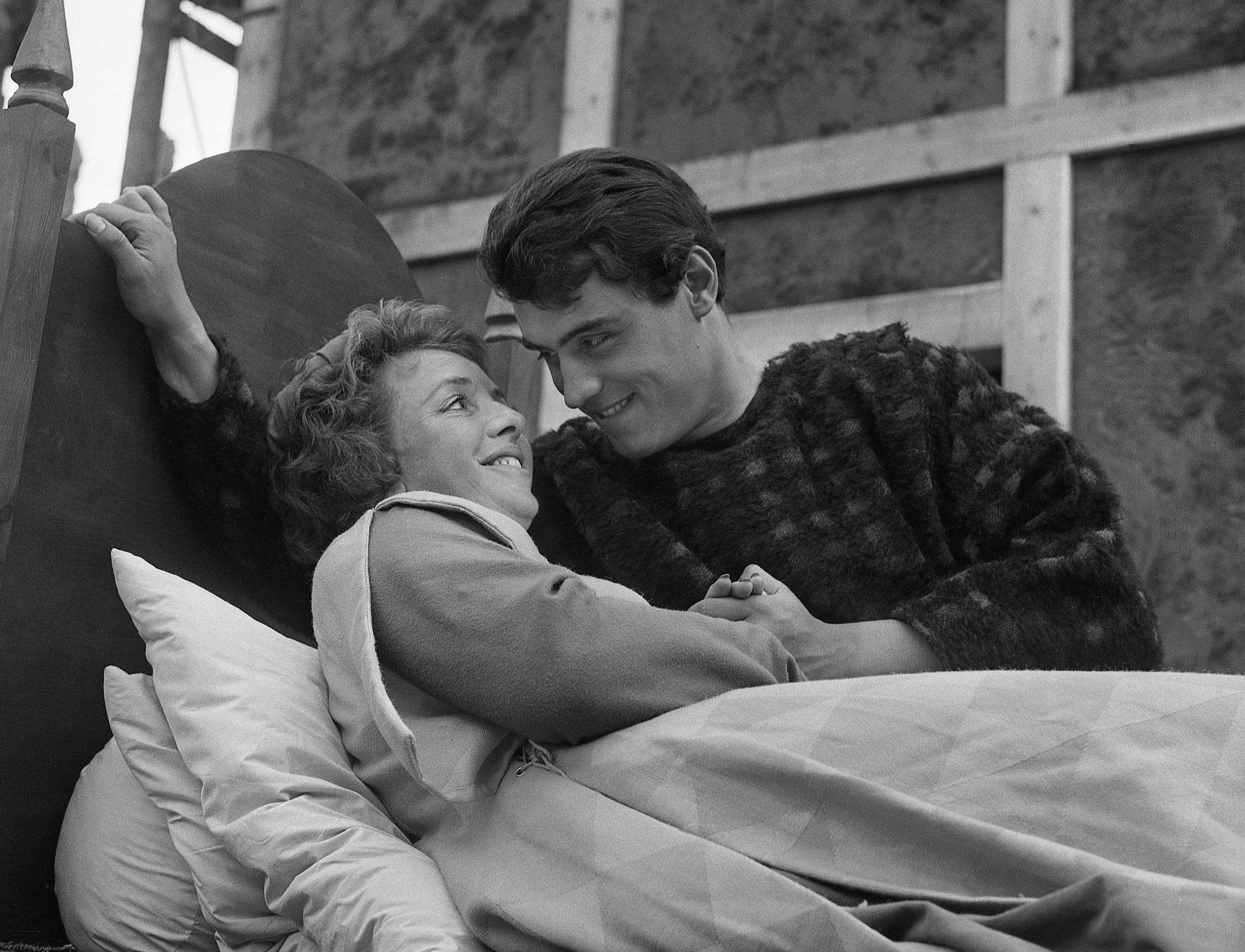
McShane as Satan in the York Mystery Plays in 1963

In the United Kingdom, McShane's best known role is antiques dealer Lovejoy in the eponymous series (1986, 1991–1994). Long before Lovejoy, McShane was a pin-up as a result of appearances in such television series as Wuthering Heights (1967, as Heathcliff), Jesus of Nazareth (1977, as Judas Iscariot), and Disraeli (1978)—as well as films such as Sky West and Crooked (1965), If It's Tuesday, This Must Be Belgium, Battle of Britain (both 1969), Pussycat, Pussycat, I Love You (1970), Sitting Target (1972), The Last of Sheila (1973) and The Fifth Musketeer (1979).

He has also enjoyed success in the United States as Don Lockwood in Dallas and is known for the role of Al Swearengen in the HBO series Deadwood, for which he won the 2005 Golden Globe Award for Best Actor in a Television Drama. He was also nominated at the 2005 Emmy Award and Screen Actors Guild Awards.

Among science fiction fans McShane is known for playing Robert Bryson in Babylon 5: The River of Souls. In a 2004 interview with The Independent, McShane stated that he wished he had turned down the role of Bryson since the technical dialogue was a struggle and he found looking at Martin Sheen, who wore an eye in the middle of his forehead, to be the most embarrassing experience that he had ever had while acting.

In 1985 McShane appeared as MC on Grace Jones' Slave to the Rhythm, a concept album featuring his narration interspersed throughout. It sold more than a million copies worldwide.

In 1992 he recorded and released a solo studio album, From Both Sides Now, in which he sang cover versions of popular songs. The album reached number 40 in the UK Albums Chart.

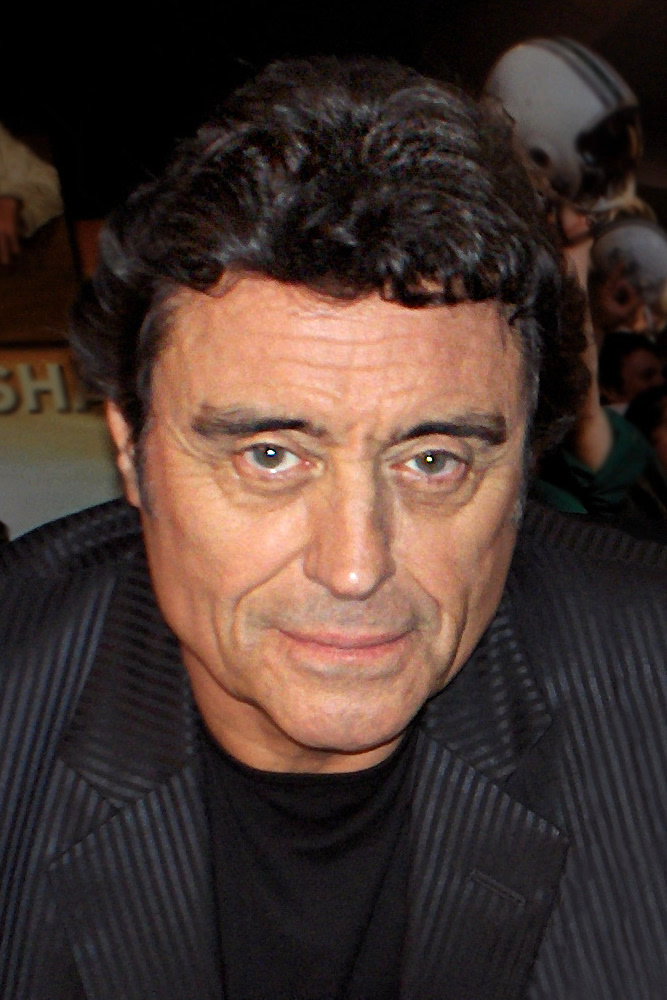
McShane in 2006

His other roles include that of armed robber and gangland boss Jack Last in the Minder episode "The Last Video Show". As Captain Hook in Shrek the Third, Ragnar Sturlusson in The Golden Compass, Tai Lung in Kung Fu Panda (for which he received an Annie Award nomination), crime boss Teddy Bass in Sexy Beast, and Mr. Bobinsky in Coraline. In live-action he has performed in Hot Rod, the action/thriller Death Race, and The Seeker. He has appeared in The West Wing as a Russian diplomat.

In July 2000, he created the role of Darryl Van Horne for the Original London production of the musical version of The Witches of Eastwick at the Theatre Royal, Drury Lane in London's West End. He stayed in the role until the show transferred to the Prince of Wales Theatre in March 2001. During 2007–08, he starred as Max in the 40th anniversary Broadway revival of Harold Pinter's The Homecoming, co-starring Eve Best, Raúl Esparza, and Michael McKean, and directed by Daniel Sullivan, at the Cort Theatre (16 December 2007 – 13 April 2008).

In 2009 he appeared in Kings, which was drawn from the biblical story of David. His portrayal of King Silas Benjamin, an analogue of King Saul, was highly praised, with one critic writing: "Whenever Kings seems to falter, McShane appears to put bite marks all over the scenery."

In 2010 McShane starred in The Pillars of the Earth as Bishop Waleran Bigod. The series was a historical drama set in 12th-century England and adapted from Ken Follett's novel of the same name. That same year it was confirmed that McShane would portray Edward "Blackbeard" Teach in the Walt Disney Company/Jerry Bruckheimer film Pirates of the Caribbean: On Stranger Tides. McShane reprised the role of Blackbeard in Pirates of the Caribbean in Disneyland and Walt Disney World, as well as the interactive quest A Pirate's Adventure: Treasure of the Seven Seas at Magic Kingdom.

In 2013 he played King Brahmwell in Bryan Singer's Jack the Giant Slayer.

Since 2010 McShane has narrated the opening teases for each round of ESPN's coverage of The Open Championship. In 2012 McShane had a guest role for two episodes as Murder Santa, a sadistic serial killer in the 1960s in the second season of American Horror Story. In 2016, he joined the cast of Game of Thrones in Season 6 as Septon Ray.

McShane announced in 2017 that a script for a two-hour Deadwood film had been submitted by creator David Milch to HBO and that a film was close to happening. "[A] two-hour movie script has been delivered to HBO. If they don't deliver [a finished product], blame them," McShane said. The film began production in October 2018. Deadwood: The Movie was released on 31 May 2019, concluding the story of the series.

== Personal life ==
In 1965, McShane married English actress Suzan Farmer and they divorced in 1968. He married his second wife, English model Ruth Post, on 8 June 1968, and they had two children, Kate and Morgan. In 1977, he began a five-year relationship with Sylvia Kristel after meeting her on the set of The Fifth Musketeer; the affair ended his marriage to Post. On 30 August 1980, McShane married American actress Gwen Humble. They live in Venice, California. Through his elder daughter, McShane has three grandchildren.

== Filmography ==
=== Film ===
Film credits
Year	Title	Role	Notes	Refs.
1962	The Wild and the Willing	Harry Brown		
1965	The Pleasure Girls	Keith Dexter		
1966	Sky West and Crooked	Roibin		
1969	If It's Tuesday, This Must Be Belgium	Charlie Cartwright		
1969	Battle of Britain	Sgt. Pilot Andy Moore		
1970	Pussycat, Pussycat, I Love You	Fred C. Dobbs		
1970	Tam Lin	Tom Lynn		
1971	Freelance	Mitch		
1971	Villain	Wolfe Lissner		
1972	Left Hand of Gemini			
1972	Sitting Target	Birdy Williams		
1973	The Last of Sheila	Anthony Wood		
1975	Ransom	Ray Petrie		
1975	Journey into Fear	Banat		
1979	The Great Riviera Bank Robbery	The Brain		
1979	The Fifth Musketeer	Fouquet		
1979	Yesterday's Hero	Rod Turner		
1981	Cheaper to Keep Her	Dr. Alfred Sunshine		
1983	Exposed	Greg Miller		
1985	Ordeal by Innocence	Philip Durant		
1985	Too Scared to Scream	Vincent Hardwick		
1985	Torchlight	Sidney		
2000	Sexy Beast	Teddy Bass		
2002	Bollywood Queen	Frank		
2003	Agent Cody Banks	Dr. Brinkman		
2003	Nemesis Game	Jeff Novak		
2005	Nine Lives	Larry		
2006	Scoop	Joe Strombel		
2006	We Are Marshall	Paul Griffen		
2007	Shrek the Third	Captain Hook	Voice	
2007	Hot Rod	Frank Powell		
2007	The Seeker	Merriman Lyon		
2007	The Golden Compass	Ragnar Sturlusson	Voice	
2008	Kung Fu Panda	Tai Lung	Voice	
2008	Death Race	Coach		
2009	Coraline	Mr. Bobinsky	Voice	
2009	Case 39	Detective Mike Barron		
2009	44 Inch Chest	Meredith	Also executive producer	
2010	The Sorcerer's Apprentice	Narrator	Uncredited	
2011	Pirates of the Caribbean: On Stranger Tides	Edward "Blackbeard" Teach		
2012	Snow White and the Huntsman	Beith		
2013	Jack the Giant Slayer	King Brahmwell		
2014	Cuban Fury	Ron Parfitt		
2014	Hercules	Amphiaraus		
2014	John Wick	Winston Scott		
2014	El Niño	El Inglés		
2015	Bilal: A New Breed of Hero	Umayya	Voice	
2016	Grimsby	MI6 Spy Boss	Uncredited	
2016	The Hollow Point	Sheriff Leland Kilbaught		
2017	John Wick: Chapter 2	Winston Scott		
2017	Jawbone	Joe Padgett		
2017	Pottersville	Bart		
2018	Here Comes the Grump	The Grump	Voice	
2019	Hellboy	Trevor Bruttenholm		
2019	Bolden	Judge Leander Perry		
2019	John Wick: Chapter 3 – Parabellum	Winston Scott		
2022	My Father's Dragon	Saiwa the Gorilla	Voice	
2023	John Wick: Chapter 4	Winston Scott		
2024	American Star	Wilson		
2024	Kung Fu Panda 4	Tai Lung	Voice	
2025	Ballerina	Winston Scott		
2025	Deep Cover	Metcalfe		

Key
†	Denotes films that have not yet been released

=== Television ===
Television credits
Year	Title	Role	Notes	Refs.
1963–1966	Play of the Week	Mick / Frank Barnes / Arthur	4 episodes	
1964	Redcap	Sapper Russell	Episode: "Epitaph for a Sweat"	
1964	The Sullavan Brothers	David Hemming	1 episode	
1966	You Can't Win	Joe Lunn	7 episodes	
1967	Wuthering Heights	Heathcliff	4 episodes	
1972	Whose Life Is It Anyway?	Ken Harrison	Television play	
1975	Space: 1999	Anton Zoref	Episode: "Force of Life"	
1975	The Lives of Jenny Dolan	Saunders	Television film	
1976	The Fantastic Journey	Sir James Camden	Episode: "The Fantastic Journey"	
1977	Roots	Sir Eric Russell	Episode: "Part Nine"	
1977	Jesus of Nazareth	Judas Iscariot	2 episodes	
1977	Code Name: Diamond Head	Sean Donovan	Television film	
1978	Will Shakespeare	Christopher Marlowe	Episode: "Dead Shepherd"	
1978	Disraeli	Benjamin Disraeli	4 episodes	
1978	The Pirate	Rashid	Television film	
1980	Armchair Thriller - High Tide	Curtis	4 episodes	
1981, 1982	Magnum, P.I.	David Norman / Edwin Clutterbuck	2 episodes	
1982	The Letter	Geoff	Television film	
1982	Marco Polo	Ali Ben Yussouf	2 episodes	
1983	Bare Essence	Niko Theophilus	11 episodes	
1983	Grace Kelly	Prince Rainier of Monaco	Television film	
1985	Evergreen	Paul Lerner	3 episodes	
1985	A.D.	Sejanus	5 episodes	
1985	Braker	Alan Roswell	Television film	
1986	American Playhouse	Willy Wax	Episode: "Rocket to the Moon"	
1986	The Murders in the Rue Morgue	Prefect of Police	Television film	
1986, 1991–1994	Lovejoy	Lovejoy	Main role	
1987	Grand Larceny	Flanagan	Television film	
1987, 1989	Miami Vice	Esteban Montoya	2 episodes	
1988	The Dirty Dozen	Lindberger	1 episode	
1988	War and Remembrance	Philip Rule	4 episodes	
1988	Chain Letter	The Messenger of Death	Television film	
1988	The Great Escape II: The Untold Story	Roger Bushell	Television film	
1989	Dallas	Don Lockwood	13 episodes	
1989	Wonderworks: Young Charlie Chaplin	Charles Chaplin Sr.	6 episodes	
1989	Minder	Jack Last	Episode: "The Last Video Show"	
1989	Miami Vice	Gen. Manuel Borbon	Episode: "Freefall"	
1989	Dick Francis Mysteries: Blood Sport	David Cleveland	Television film	
1989	Dick Francis Mysteries: In The Frame	David Cleveland	Television film	
1989	Dick Francis Mysteries: Twice Shy	David Cleveland	Television film	
1990	Perry Mason: The Case of the Desperate Deception	Andre Marchand	Television film	
1990	Columbo	Leland St. John	Episode: "Rest in Peace, Mrs. Columbo"	
1990	Mistress of Suspense	Steven Castle	Episode: "Sauce for the Goose"	
1994	White Goods	Ian Deegan	Television film	
1995	Soul Survivors	Otis Cooke	2 episodes	
1996	Madson	John Madson	6 episodes	
1997	The Naked Truth	Leland Banks	2 episodes	
1998	Babylon 5: The River of Souls	Robert Bryson, PhD	Television film	
1999	D.R.E.A.M. Team	Oliver Maxwell	Television film	
2001	Britain's Most Terrifying Ghost Stories	Narrator	Episode: "All"	
2001	Thieves	Jack	Episode: "Jack's Back"	
2002	The West Wing	Nikolai Ivanovich	Episode: "Enemies Foreign and Domestic"	
2002	In Deep	Jamie Lam	2 episodes	
2002	Man and Boy	Marty Mann	Television film	
2003	Trust	Alan Cooper-Fozzard	6 episodes	
2003	The Twilight Zone	Dr. Chandler	Episode: "Cold Fusion"	
2004–2006	Deadwood	Al Swearengen	36 episodes	
2008	SpongeBob SquarePants	Gordon	Episode: "Dear Vikings"; voice	
2009	Kings	King Silas Benjamin	12 episodes	
2010	The Pillars of the Earth	Waleran Bigod	8 episodes	
2012	American Horror Story: Asylum	Leigh Emerson	2 episodes	
2015	Ray Donovan	Andrew Finney	9 episodes	
2016	Doctor Thorne	Sir Roger Scatcherd	3 episodes	
2016	Game of Thrones	Brother Ray	Episode: "The Broken Man"	
2017–2021	American Gods	Mr. Wednesday	Main cast	
2019	Deadwood: The Movie	Al Swearengen	Television film; also executive producer	
2019	Law & Order: Special Victims Unit	Sir Tobias Moore	Episode: "I'm Going to Make You a Star"	
2021	The Simpsons	Artemis	Voice, episode: "The Last Barfighter"	
2023	One Piece	Narrator	Episode: "Romance Dawn"	

=== Video games ===
Video game credits
Year	Title	Voice role	Refs.
2019	John Wick Hex	Winston Scott	

=== Theme park attractions ===
Year	Title	Role	Venue
2011	Pirates of the Caribbean	Blackbeard	Disneyland; Walt Disney World
2013	A Pirate's Adventure: Treasure of the Seven Seas	Blackbeard	Magic Kingdom

== Awards and nominations ==
Year	Association	Category	Nominated work	Result
2004	Television Critics Association Awards	Individual Achievement in Drama	Deadwood	Won
2005	Golden Globe Awards	Best Actor – Television Series Drama	Deadwood	Won
2005	Gotham Awards	Best Ensemble Cast	Nine Lives	Nominated
2005	Primetime Emmy Awards	Outstanding Lead Actor in a Drama Series	Deadwood	Nominated
2005	Satellite Awards	Best Actor – Television Series Drama	Deadwood	Nominated
2005	Television Critics Association Awards	Individual Achievement in Drama	Deadwood	Nominated
2006	Screen Actors Guild Awards	Outstanding Performance by a Male Actor in a Drama Series	Deadwood	Nominated
2007	Screen Actors Guild Awards	Outstanding Performance by an Ensemble in a Drama Series	Deadwood	Nominated
2009	Annie Awards	Best Voice Acting in an Animated Featured Production	Kung Fu Panda	Nominated
2010	San Diego Film Critics Society Awards	Best Ensemble Performance	44 Inch Chest	Won
2010	Satellite Awards	Best Actor – Miniseries or Television Film	The Pillars of the Earth	Nominated
2011	Golden Globe Awards	Best Actor – Miniseries or Television Film	The Pillars of the Earth	Nominated
2011	Golden Nymph Awards	Outstanding Actor in a Miniseries	The Pillars of the Earth	Nominated
2011	Teen Choice Awards	Choice Movie: Villain	Pirates of the Caribbean: On Stranger Tides	Nominated
2018	Critics' Choice Television Awards	Best Actor in a Drama Series	American Gods	Nominated
2019	Primetime Emmy Awards	Outstanding Television Movie (as executive producer)	Deadwood: The Movie	Nominated
2025	Children's and Family Emmy Awards	Outstanding Children's Personality	One Piece	Nominated
