= 44 Inch Chest =

2009 British crime drama film directed by Malcolm Venville

- Theatrical Release Poster
- Directed by: Malcolm Venville
- Written by: Louis Mellis; David Scinto
- Produced by: Richard Brown; Steve Golin
- Starring: Ray Winstone; Ian McShane; John Hurt; Tom Wilkinson; Stephen Dillane; Joanne Whalley
- Cinematography: Daniel Landin
- Edited by: Rick Russell
- Music by: Angelo Badalamenti
- Production company: Anonymous Content
- Distributed by: Momentum Pictures
- Release dates: 19 October 2009 (BFI London Film Festival); 15 January 2010 (United Kingdom)
- Running time: 95 minutes
- Country: United Kingdom
- Language: English
- Box office: $247,553

44 Inch Chest is a 2009 British black comedy-drama film directed by Malcolm Venville in his directorial debut. It stars Ray Winstone, Ian McShane, John Hurt, Tom Wilkinson, Stephen Dillane, and Joanne Whalley. The film was released on 19 October 2009.

It was originally written for the stage in 1996 by Louis Mellis and David Scinto, who went on to write Sexy Beast (2000) also starring Winstone and McShane. The film was produced by Richard Brown and Steve Golin (Babel, Eternal Sunshine of the Spotless Mind), and featured cinematography by Daniel Landin. The score is a collaboration between Angelo Badalamenti and Massive Attack.

== Plot ==
Colin Diamond is a successful car salesman who, after discovering his wife Liz is having an affair, has an emotional breakdown. His friends convince him to kidnap his wife's lover and then encourage him to torture and kill him.

Diamond's partners in crime are suave homosexual gambler Meredith, crotchety and bigoted Old Man Peanut, the down-to-earth Archie and the combustible Mal, who by turns encourage Colin's lust for revenge and sympathise with his situation, and conspire to emotionally and mentally torture Liz's new boyfriend, Loverboy, a "Frog" waiter, first by locking him in a cupboard and threatening him, and then tying him up and subjecting him to humiliating verbal and physical assault.

Parts of the story occur in flashback, with Colin discovering Liz's infidelity and the after-effects of it, which then affect the present, in which he tries to come to terms with the shame and torment that this brings to him. Parts of the story also appear to happen inside Colin's mind, with his attempt to reconcile with himself, using his friends as representations of his own turmoil, and his resolving of the situation.

== Cast ==
- Ray Winstone as Colin Diamond
- Ian McShane as Meredith
- John Hurt as Old Man Peanut
- Tom Wilkinson as Archie
- Stephen Dillane as Mal
- Joanne Whalley as Liz Diamond
- Melvil Poupaud as Loverboy
- Steven Berkoff as Tippi Gordon
- Edna Doré as Archie's Mother
- Andy de la Tour as Biggy Walpole
- Derek Lea as Bumface
- Ramon Christian as Boy on Sofa

== Production ==
This was the third and last collaboration between writers Louis Mellis and David Scinto, who had previously written Gangster No. 1 (2000) and Sexy Beast (2000). As with those movies, they used an artist as a source of reference with the works of René Magritte.

44 Inch Chest is set and filmed in Borehamwood, Hertfordshire, and London, England on 26 May and 13 July 2008.

== Reception ==
44 Inch Chest has received mixed reviews. On the review aggregator website Rotten Tomatoes, 40% of 82 critics' reviews are positive. The website's consensus reads: "An actor's movie with a strong cast, 44 Inch Chest can't quite redeem its static plotting and tonal shifts." Metacritic, which uses a weighted average, assigned the film a score of 47 out of 100, based on 18 critics, indicating "mixed or average" reviews. The Daily Telegraph gave the film 3/5 stars, calling the film "A plum actors' piece which both gains and loses points by soberly stalling its own plot." Peter Bradshaw of The Guardian was less enthusiastic, giving the film 2/5 saying "The film talks the talk – in fact, it talks and talks and talks the talk. But the walk isn't happening."

== Home media ==
On 10 May 2010, the DVD was released in Region 2 in the United Kingdom; it was distributed by Momentum Pictures. Image Entertainment purchased American distribution rights months before the film's festival premiere; they released the Region 1 DVD on 20 April 2010.

== Adaptations ==
From August 12th to 24th 2019, 44 Inch Chest was performed on stage for the first time as part of the Edinburgh Festival Fringe, at the Perth Theatre (aka theSpace on North Bridge). The play, an abridged edit of the original 1996 script, was produced by Out of Bounds Theatre.

== See also ==
- Gangster No. 1, a 2000 British gangster film also written by Mellis.
