= Anonymous Content =

American film and television production, and a talent management company

Anonymous Content LLP
- Logo used since 2024
- Type: Private
- Industry: Entertainment
- Predecessor: Propaganda Films
- Founded: 1999; 27 years ago
- Founder: Steve Golin; Dave Morrison; Gore Verbinski
- Headquarters: Culver City, California; NYC, New York; London, England
- Number of locations: 3 (until 2019)
- Area served: Worldwide
- Services: Film production; Television production; Talent management
- Divisions: See § Divisions and ventures
- Website: anonymouscontent.com

Anonymous Content LLP (AC) is an American independent global entertainment company founded in 1999 by CEO Steve Golin, Dave Morrison and Gore Verbinski. It is based in Los Angeles with offices in Culver City, New York City and London.

== History ==
Anonymous Content was founded in 1999 by CEO Steve Golin, who had left Propaganda Films, Dave Morrison and Gore Verbinski. The company initially had a deal with USA Films to produce its pictures. The company began taking on the Anonymous Content name in 2000. In 2002, AC made its first foray into television with Crime & Punishment, a reality show that ran for three seasons on NBC.

In May 2011, it was announced that AC's talent management division had added managers Tony Lipp, Sandra Chang and Doug Wald, who brought several major talents with them.

In May 2014, it signed a three-year first look production deal with Paramount Television, where Paramount would produce and distribute scripted programming developed by AC.

In February 2016, Kevin Cotter was hired as Director of Literary Affairs at the company's New York office, where he would oversee researching books, articles and other intellectual property for development and production.

== Divisions and ventures ==
=== AC Independent ===
In 2022, Anonymous Content launched its sales and finance division, AC Independent.

=== Representation ===
In 2017, Anonymous Content established a dedicated Media Rights division, co-led by longtime UTA partners and book department co-heads Howie Sanders and Kassie Evashevski. The department represents authors, journalists and other media creators.

=== The Lab ===
The Lab's projects have included branded entertainment projects directed by Olivia Wilde, Mark Romanek, Pantera, Cara Stricker and Patrick Daughters for HP, Lime and Adobe.

=== Joint ventures ===
As of 2023, the company currently has five international joint ventures. Among them are a partnership with Spain's Morena Films, AC Chapter One in the UK with Casarotto and United Agents Anonymous Federation in France, AC Nordic, and AC Brazil.

== In-development projects ==
=== Film projects ===
In December 2024, Vulture reported that Anonymous Content and Alex Gibney were developing a documentary about the killing of Brian Thompson and suspect Luigi Mangione.

=== Television projects ===
In October 2021, AC announced it would adapt Lillian Hellman's play The Children's Hour into a television series, with Bess Wohl writing the screenplay. It also announced that it would adapt Ursula Le Guin's 1974 novel The Dispossessed as a series. In October 2023, CD Projekt announced that AC would be developing a live-action series within the universe of Cyberpunk 2077.

== Catalog ==
=== Films ===
Catalog of films produced by Anonymous Content
Year	Title	Release date	Distributor	Box office (USD)		Reception	
Year	Title	Release date	Distributor	Budget	Gross	Rotten Tomatoes	Metacritic
2000	The Upgrade	October 12, 2000	—N/a	—N/a	—N/a	—N/a	—N/a
2001	BigLove	January 19, 2001	Apollo Cinema	—N/a	—N/a	—N/a	—N/a
2001	Ambush	April 26, 2001	BMW Films	—N/a	—N/a	—N/a	—N/a
2001	Chosen	May 10, 2001	BMW Films	—N/a	—N/a	—N/a	—N/a
2001	The Follow	May 24, 2001	BMW Films	—N/a	—N/a	—N/a	—N/a
2004	Eternal Sunshine of the Spotless Mind	March 19, 2004	Focus Features	$20M	$72.3M	93%	89
2006	Lake of Fire	October 3, 2006	TH!NKFilm	$6M	—N/a	94%	83
2006	Babel	October 27, 2006	Paramount Vantage; Summit Entertainment	$25M	$135.5M	69%	69
2007	Rendition	September 7, 2007	New Line Cinema	$27.5M	$27M	47%	55
2009	44 Inch Chest	October 19, 2009	Momentum Pictures	—N/a	$247.6K	41%	47
2010	Winter's Bone	June 11, 2010	Roadside Attractions	$2M	$16.1M	94%	90
2011	The Beaver	May 6, 2011	Summit Entertainment	$21M	$6M	61%	60
2012	Big Miracle	February 3, 2012	Universal Pictures	$40M	$24.7M	75%	61
2012	Seeking a Friend for the End of the World	February 22, 2012	Focus Features	$10M	$9.6M	55%	59
2012	Girl Most Likely	July 19, 2012	Lionsgate Films; Roadside Attractions	—N/a	$1.38M	22%	38
2012	Fun Size	October 26, 2012	Paramount Pictures	$14M	$11.4M	25%	37
2013	The Fifth Estate	October 18, 2013	Walt Disney Studios Motion Pictures	$26M	$8.6M	36%	49
2014	Adult World	February 14, 2014	IFC Films	$4M	$19M	53%	38
2014	Laggies	May 9, 2014	A24	—N/a	$1.8M	64%	63
2015	The End of the Tour	January 23, 2015	A24	—N/a	$3M	92%	82
2015	Spotlight	November 6, 2015	Open Road Films	$20M	$88M	97%	93
2015	The Revenant	December 25, 2015	20th Century Fox	$135M	$533M	78%	76
2016	Triple 9	February 26, 2016	Open Road Films	$20M	$23.4M	53%	52
2016	The Meddler	April 22, 2016	Sony Pictures Classics	—N/a	$3.9M	85%	68
2016	Bastille Day	April 22, 2016	StudioCanal; Focus Features	—N/a	$9.8M	48%	48
2016	The Good Neighbor	September 16, 2016	Vertical Entertainment	—N/a	—N/a	29%	32
2016	Collateral Beauty	December 16, 2016	Warner Bros. Pictures	$36M	$88.2M	14%	23
2018	Don't Worry, He Won't Get Far on Foot	July 13, 2018	Amazon Studios	$3.5M	$4.2M	76%	67
2018	The Wife	August 17, 2018	Sony Pictures Classics			85%	
2018	Boy Erased	November 2, 2018	Focus Features	$11M	$11.9M	81%	69
2018	Outlaw King	November 23, 2018	Netflix	$120M	—N/a	63%	59
2019	The Beach Bum	March 29, 2019	Neon	—N/a	$4.6M	56%	55
2019	The Chaperone	March 29, 2019	PBS Distribution			48%	
2019	The Laundromat	September 27, 2019	Netflix	—N/a	—N/a	41%	57
2020	The Midnight Sky	December 23, 2020	Netflix	$100M	$62.6K	51%	58
2020	Worth	September 3, 2021	Netflix	—N/a	—N/a	78%	66
2021	Stillwater	July 30, 2021	Focus Features	$20M	$16.9M	75%	60
2021	Star-Crossed: The Film	September 10, 2021	Paramount+	—N/a	—N/a	—N/a	—N/a
2021	Swan Song	December 17, 2021	Apple TV+			80%	
2022	The Stranger	October 19, 2022	Transmission Films; Netflix			92%	
2022	The Independent	November 2, 2022	Relativity Media	—N/a	—N/a	35%	—N/a
2022	Corner Office	August 4, 2023	Lionsgate Films; Grindstone Entertainment Group	—N/a	—N/a	26%	—N/a
2023	Foe	October 6, 2023	Amazon Studios			24%	
2023	The Marsh King's Daughter	November 3, 2023	STXfilms; Lionsgate Films; Roadside Attractions	—N/a	—N/a	40%	—N/a
2024	Which Brings Me to You	January 19, 2024	Decal	—N/a	—N/a	70%	—N/a
2024	God & Country	February 16, 2024	Oscilloscope Laboratories	—N/a	—N/a	88%	—N/a
2024	The American	May 17, 2024	Vertical	—N/a	—N/a	—N/a	—N/a
2024	War Game	August 2, 2024	Submarine Deluxe; Decal	—N/a	—N/a	80%	—N/a
2024	Uglies	September 13, 2024	Netflix	—N/a	—N/a	14%	—N/a
2024	Union	October 18, 2024	Level Ground Productions	—N/a	—N/a	89%	—N/a
2024	Nickel Boys	December 13, 2024	Amazon MGM Studios	—N/a	—N/a	91%	—N/a
2025	Last Take: Rust and the Story of Halyna	March 11, 2025	Hulu	—N/a	—N/a	86%	—N/a
2025	Pangolin: Kulu's Journey	April 21, 2025	Netflix	—N/a	—N/a	—N/a	—N/a
2025	The Carpenter's Son	November 14, 2025	Magnolia Pictures	—N/a	—N/a	—N/a	—N/a
2025	Orwell: 2+2=5	October 3, 2025	Neon	—N/a	—N/a	—N/a	—N/a
TBA	Carnival	TBA	Voltage Pictures	—N/a	—N/a	—N/a	—N/a
TBA	The Underwater Welder	TBA	Waypoint Production	—N/a	—N/a	—N/a	—N/a
TBA	In the Garden of the King	TBA	Made In Africa Films	—N/a	—N/a	—N/a	—N/a
TBA	Princeless	TBA	Sony Pictures Releasing	—N/a	—N/a	—N/a	—N/a
TBA	Time After Time	TBA	Lionsgate	—N/a	—N/a	—N/a	—N/a
TBA	Imagine Agents	TBA	20th Century Studios	—N/a	—N/a	—N/a	—N/a
TBA	Score!	TBA	Warner Bros.	—N/a	—N/a	—N/a	—N/a
TBA	Burn	TBA	—N/a	—N/a	—N/a	—N/a	—N/a
TBA	Buzzkill	TBA	—N/a	—N/a	—N/a	—N/a	—N/a
TBA	What If It's Us	TBA	—N/a	—N/a	—N/a	—N/a	—N/a

=== Television ===
Catalog of television shows produced by Anonymous Content
Year	Title	Air date	Number of		Distributor
Year	Title	Air date	Seasons	Episodes	Distributor
2002	Crime & Punishment	June 16, 2002 – July 17, 2004	3	26	NBC
2014	True Detective	January 12, 2014 – present	4	30	HBO
2014	The Knick	August 8, 2014 – December 18, 2015	2	20	Cinemax
2015	Mr. Robot	June 24, 2015 – December 22, 2019	4	45	USA Network
2016	Quarry	September 9, 2016 – October 28, 2016	1	8	Cinemax
2016	Berlin Station	October 16, 2016 – February 17, 2019	3	29	Epix
2016	The OA	December 16, 2016 – March 22, 2019	2	16	Netflix
2017	13 Reasons Why	March 31, 2017 – June 5, 2020	4	49	Netflix
2017	Philip K. Dick's Electric Dreams	September 17, 2017 – March 19, 2018	1	10	Channel 4, Amazon Prime Video
2018	Counterpart	January 21, 2018 – February 17, 2019	2	20	Starz
2018	The Alienist	January 22, 2018 – August 9, 2020	2	18	TNT
2018	Flint Town	March 2, 2018	1	8	Netflix
2018	One Dollar	August 30, 2018 – November 1, 2018	1	10	CBS All Access
2018	Maniac	September 21, 2018	1	10	Netflix
2018	Homecoming	November 2, 2018 – May 22, 2020	2	17	Amazon Prime Video
2019	I Am the Night	January 27, 2019 – March 4, 2019	1	6	TNT
2019	Bonding	April 24, 2019 – January 27, 2021	2	15	Netflix
2019	Catch-22	May 17, 2019	1	6	Hulu
2019	Wild Bill	June 12, 2019 – July 17, 2019	1	6	ITV
2019	Dickinson	November 1, 2019 – December 24, 2021	3	30	Apple TV+
2020	Briarpatch	February 6, 2020 – April 13, 2020	1	10	USA Network
2020	Home Before Dark	April 3, 2020 – August 13, 2021	2	20	Apple TV+
2020	When the Streetlights Go On	April 3, 2020 – April 15, 2020	1	10	Quibi
2020	Paradise Lost	April 13, 2020	1	10	Spectrum Originals
2020	Defending Jacob	April 24, 2020 – May 29, 2020	1	8	Apple TV+
2020	Love in the Time of Corona	August 22, 2020 – August 23, 2020	1	4	Freeform
2022	The Last Days of Ptolemy Grey	March 11, 2022 – April 11, 2022	1	6	Apple TV+
2022	Anatomy of a Scandal	April 15, 2022	1	6	Netflix
2022	Gaslit	April 24, 2022 – June 12, 2022	1	8	Starz
2022	Angelyne	May 19, 2022	1	5	Peacock
2022	Shantaram	October 14, 2022 – December 16, 2022	1	12	Apple TV+
2022	Random Acts of Flyness	December 10, 2022 – December 24, 2022	1	6	HBO
2023	Unprisoned	March 10, 2023 – July 17, 2024	2	16	Hulu
2023	Saint X	April 26, 2023 – May 31, 2023	1	8	Hulu
2024	Boy Swallows Universe	January 11, 2024	1	7	Netflix
2024	Sexy Beast	January 25, 2024	1	8	Paramount+
2024	Time Bandits	July 24, 2024 – August 21, 2024	1	10	Apple TV+
2024	Disclaimer	October 11, 2024 – November 8, 2024	1	7	Apple TV+
2025	DMV	October 13, 2025 – May 11, 2026	1	20	CBS
2026	Little House on the Prairie	July 9, 2026	1	8	Netflix
2026	East of Eden	October 1, 2026	1	7	Netflix
2026	12 12 12	November 13, 2026	1	8	Apple TV
2027	Neuromancer	January 22, 2027	1	10	Apple TV
TBD	The Savant	TBD	1	8	TBD

== Awards and nominations ==
=== Berlin Music Video Awards ===
The Berlin Music Video Awards is an international festival that promotes the art of music videos.

Year	Nominated work	Award	Result	Ref.
2025	Anonymous Content	Best Production Company	Nominated	
2026	Anonymous Content	Best Production Company	Pending	
