= Louis Mellis =

Scottish actor and screenwriter (born 20th century

- Born: 20th century Edinburgh, Scotland, United Kingdom
- Occupation(s): Actor, screenwriter

Louis Mellis (born 20th century) is a British actor and screenwriter from Edinburgh, Scotland.

== Career ==
Along with David Scinto, he wrote the screenplay for the films Sexy Beast (2000) and 44 Inch Chest (2009).

In 2010, Mellis signed on to write The Princess's Gangster, based on the "true story" of Princess Margaret's affair with gangster John Bindon in the late 1960s.

Among gamers he is known for having voiced Darth Sion, a character in the video game Star Wars: Knights of the Old Republic II: The Sith Lords (2004).

He is also known for his voiceover work in advertising, and narrated the 1999 Guinness advert "Surfer".

== Filmography ==
Film	Role
44 Inch Chest (2009)	producer and writer
Celebrity Shark Bait (2005) (television)	narrator
Sexy Beast (2000)	writer
Gangster No. 1 (2000)	writer
Star Wars: Knights of the Old Republic II: The Sith Lords (2004) (video game)	voice actor (Darth Sion/Additional Voices)
Mulberry – "The Art Class" (1993) (television episode)	actor (Football Referee)
The Grass Arena (1991)	actor (Jock)
Nuns on the Run (1990)	actor (Bank Security Guard)
The Bill – "Don't Like Mondays" (1989) (television episode)	actor (Davies)
Hawks (1988)	actor (Bouncers and Clients)
Vroom (1988)	actor (Flanny)
Pump Up the Volume: The History of House (2001)	narrator
