= Oakfield Preparatory School =

Coordinates: 51°26′28″N 0°05′38″W

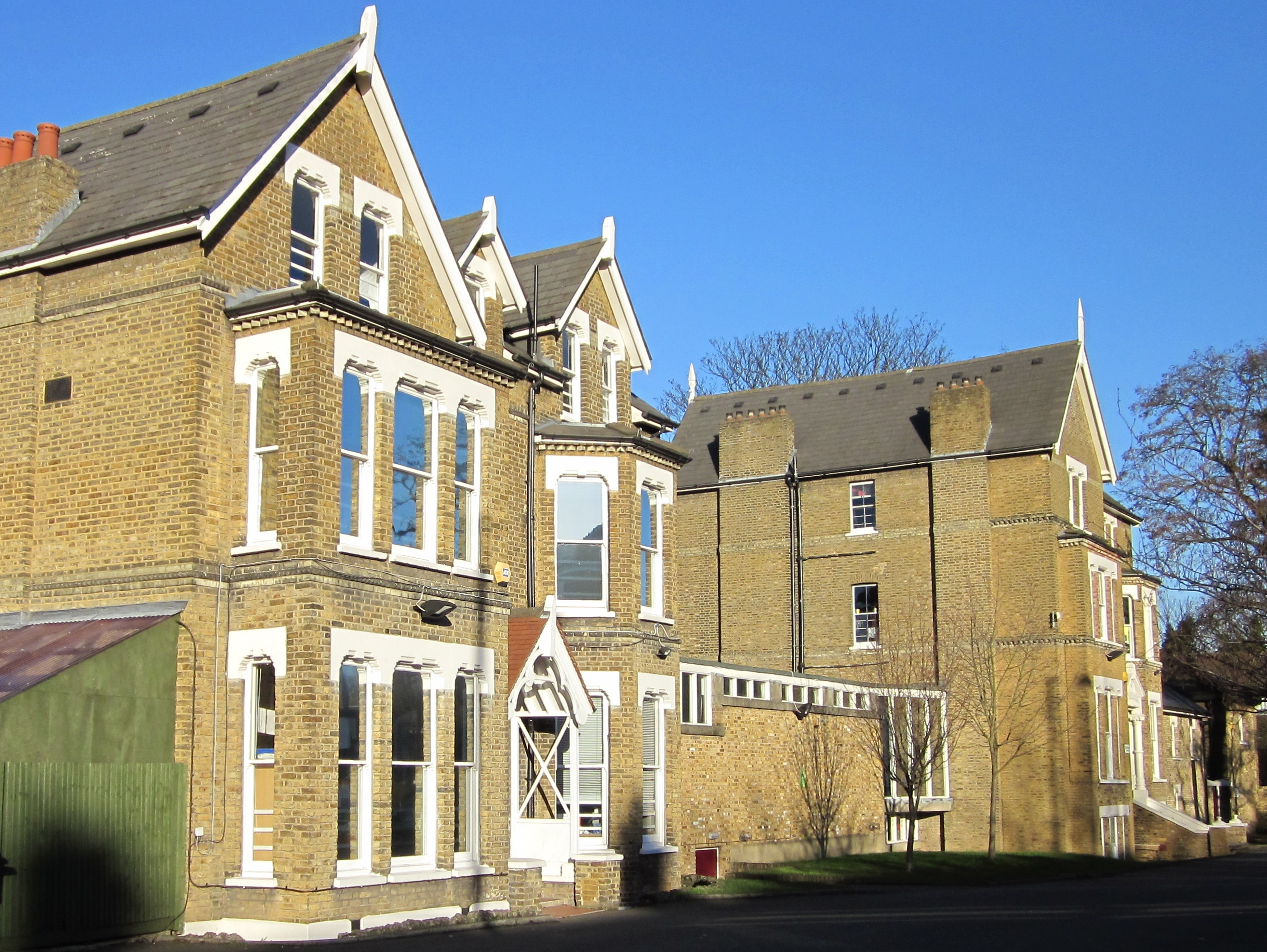

Location
- Thurlow Park Road; Dulwich, London, SE21 8HP; England

Information
- Type: Preparatory school
- Motto: A World of Opportunity
- Established: 1888
- Local authority: Lambeth
- Department for Education URN: 100644 Tables
- Grades: Preschool – Y6
- Gender: both
- Age: 2 to 11
- Enrollment: 360 (approx.)
- Colours: Burgundy, yellow and grey.
- Website: http://www.oakfield.dulwich.sch.uk

Oakfield Preparatory School is an independent coeducational preparatory school in West Dulwich, Lambeth. in the United Kingdom

Oakfield is a member of the Independent Schools Association. Over 350 boys and girls aged between 2 and 11 are enrolled at the school.

For many years a senior school was run from the building on the south side of the road under the name of John Wycliffe Prep School, for 11-16 year olds.

== World War II ==
As with many other surrounding locations, pupils were evacuated during World War II because of the threat of bombing.
